= BAE Systems Military Air & Information =

Business unit of BAE Systems

- Company type: Division
- Industry: Defence; Aeronautics
- Founded: 2007
- Headquarters: Warton Aerodrome, Borough of Fylde
- Key people: Chris Boardman, Managing Director
- Products: Military Aircraft and Aerospace systems, unmanned aerial vehicles
- Parent: BAE Systems

BAE Systems Military Air & Information (MAI, formerly Military Air Solutions (MAS)) is a business unit of British defence company BAE Systems responsible for the design, development, manufacture and support of fixed wing military aircraft. MAI customers include the Royal Air Force, Royal Saudi Air Force, US Navy and Indian Air Force.

== History ==
MAI was formed on 1 January 2011 through a merger of the Air Systems and CS&S Military Air Solutions & Support (MASS) business units. The unit through its products and operating bases encompasses nearly a hundred years of industrial history. MAI direct ancestors include the English Electric Company, Vickers-Armstrongs, the British Aircraft Corporation, Avro, Blackburn Aircraft, De Havilland, Hawker Siddeley and the Bristol Aeroplane Company.

Some of the products that have been produced by MAI's predecessors include the Avro Vulcan, English Electric Lightning, Hawker Hunter, English Electric Canberra, Blackburn Buccaneer and the ill-fated TSR-2. In recognition full-size replicas of the EE Lightning and the Lockheed Martin F-35 Lightning II serve as gate guardians at MAI's Samlesbury site where both were manufactured.

== Sites ==
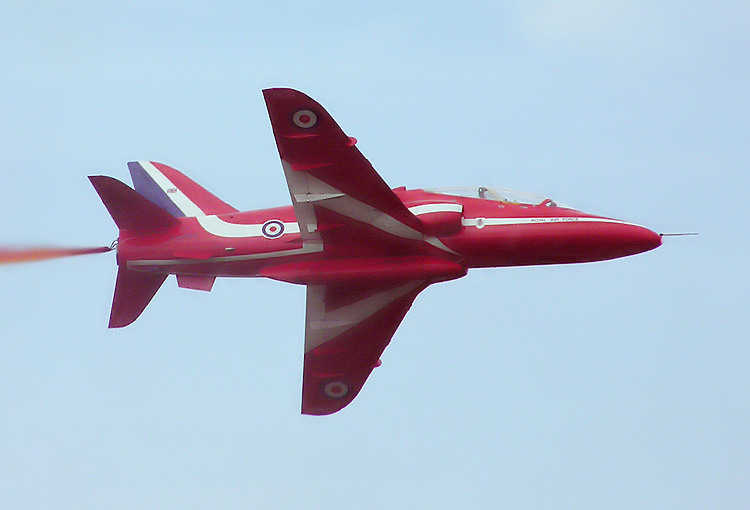
A Hawk of the Red Arrows

- Warton Aerodrome, Lancashire - Warton is the headquarters of MAI and home to the central assembly facility for the Eurofighter Typhoon and Hawk configuration and to the upgrades for Harrier and the Panavia Tornado. The division's major testing facilities and commercial offices are based there.
- Samlesbury Aerodrome, Lancashire - Samlesbury, situated between Blackburn and Preston, is home to the production facilities for the Typhoon front fuselage and BAE's F-35 Lightning II manufacturing operations. It was previously also responsible for some sections of the T-45 Goshawk airframe. Sections for Airbus are also subcontracted to the site. The site unlike many other MAI sites does not have an operational runway. The runway closed in the 1980s.
- Brough Aerodrome, Yorkshire - Brough near to Hull was home to Hawk production and assembly. The airfield was closed during the 1990s but flying from the Brough runway (to deliver Hawks for final configuration at Warton) temporarily resumed in 2008. Brough was later downsized to producing Hawk component parts.
- Woodford Aerodrome, Greater Manchester - Woodford near Manchester was home to the ill-fated Nimrod MRA4 programme. It closed in 2011.
- Chadderton, Greater Manchester - Chadderton near Manchester is a former manufacturing facility (Historically as Avro) but the site continued as a major office centre for the company until it closed in 2012.
- Preston, Lancashire - Several of the unit's central functional offices are located in Strand Road area of the city as well as the Apprentice training centre.
- Yeovil, Somerset
- Humberside Airport, Lincolnshire - The company's Aircraft Maintenance Training Centre is located at the airport.

The firm also has a major presence on many RAF stations; notably RAF Coningsby and RAF Marham.

== Products ==
=== Aircraft ===
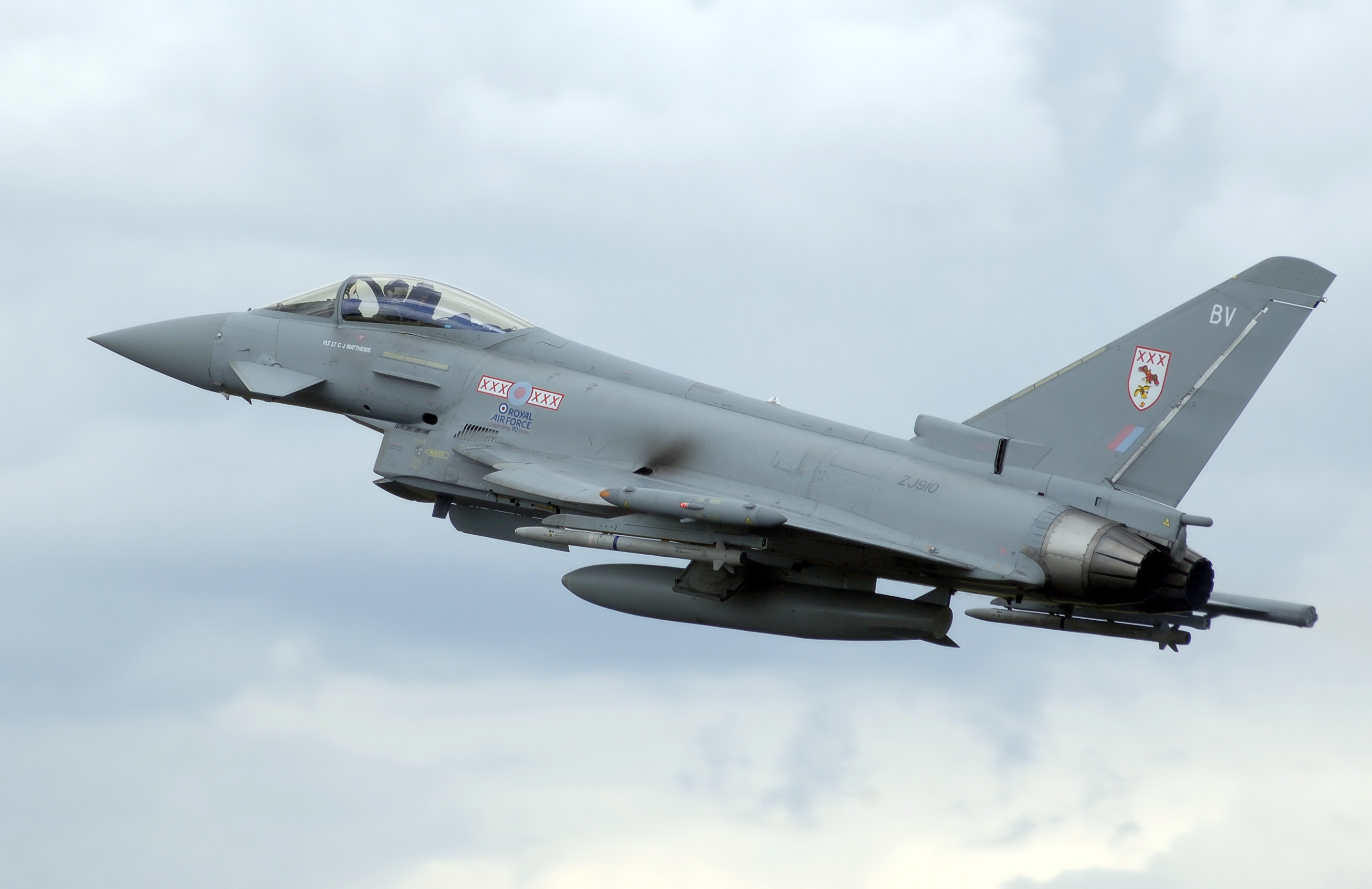
MAI assembled Eurofighter Typhoon of the Royal Air Force

- Eurofighter Typhoon - BAE Systems has a 33% share in Eurofighter GmbH along with Alenia and EADS's Spanish and German divisions. MAI is responsible for the production of all RAF and Saudi aircraft as well as designing and producing all front fuselages for the programme.
- Panavia Tornado - MAI predecessor British Aerospace manufactured all RAF and Saudi aircraft and MAI continues to offer support to these air forces.
- Panavia Tornado ADV - MAI predecessor British Aerospace manufactured all RAF and Saudi aircraft and MAI continues to offer support to these air forces.
- BAE Systems Harrier II - Originally developed and manufactured at Dunsfold and Kingston the business unit today provides support and upgrades to the aircraft.
- BAE Systems Hawk T.2 - The Hawk trainer was manufactured initially at Dunsfold, Bitteswell and later Brough (and now Warton) and has been produced for numerous armed forces around the globe including the Royal Air Force, Royal Australian Air Force, Royal Canadian Air Force and South African Air Force.
  - McDonnell Douglas T-45 Goshawk - A naval development of the Hawk aircraft manufactured with McDonnell Douglas (now Boeing) for the United States Navy
- BAE Systems Nimrod MRA4 - Cancelled maritime reconnaissance aircraft

=== Aircraft projects ===
- BAE Systems Replica
- Flapless Air Vehicle Integrated Industrial Research
- BAE Systems Tempest (Global Combat Air Programme)

=== UAVs and drones ===
- Advanced Systems and Future Capability (AS&FC)
  - BAE Systems Ampersand
  - BAE Systems Corax
  - BAE Systems Demon
  - BAE Systems GA22
  - BAE Systems HERTI
  - BAE Systems Mantis
  - BAE Systems Phoenix
  - BAE Systems Silver Fox
  - BAE Systems Skylynx II
  - BAE Systems Taranis
  - BAE Systems/Dassault Telemos
  - BAE Systems UAS Concept 2
