= EADS Barracuda =

European Unmanned Aerial Vehicle

Barracuda
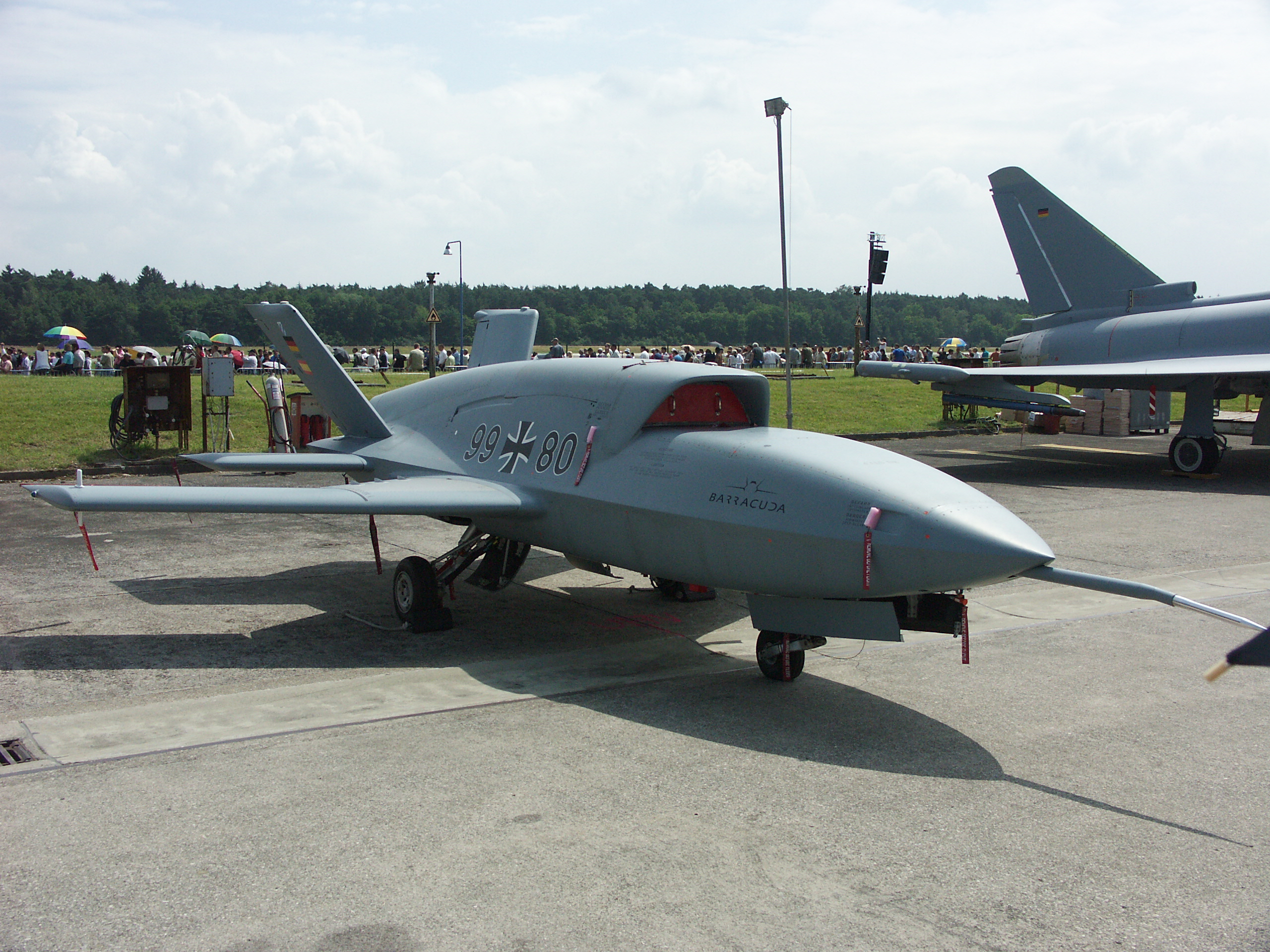

General information
- Type: Reconnaissance and UCAV
- National origin: Germany and Spain
- Manufacturer: EADS

History
- First flight: 2 April 2006

The EADS Barracuda was a jet powered unmanned aerial vehicle (UAV) technology demonstrator that was designed and produced by the European aerospace company EADS. In 2006, the Barracuda was the largest UAV to have been produced in Europe.

Development of the Barracuda formally started in 2003; the primary nations supporting the programme were Germany and Spain. Prior to its existence being revealed at the 2006 International Aerospace Exhibition, the Barracuda was worked on in secret. The programme had been viewed as a competitor for the French-led Dassault nEUROn unmanned combat aerial vehicle (UCAV) demonstrator. Capable of fully-autonomous long range operations, the Barracuda was principally intended to demonstrate and validate various drone technologies for future mature UAV platforms. It could reportedly perform various mission roles, including those of aerial reconnaissance, maritime patrol, and even combat.

Flights of the Barracuda were temporarily put on hold after the first prototype crashed at Mar Menor while approaching for landing during a test flight in late 2006. Two years later, the program officially resumed; a second prototype was completed in November 2008. During the following year, the Barracuda performed a series of successful flight tests in Goose Bay, Canada, during July 2009. Additional test flights investigating various aspects of UAV operations and technologies were being conducted into 2012. The Barracuda was retired after six test campaigns; technologies from the programme have since been reused on platforms such as Eurodrone and the Future Combat Air System.

== Development ==
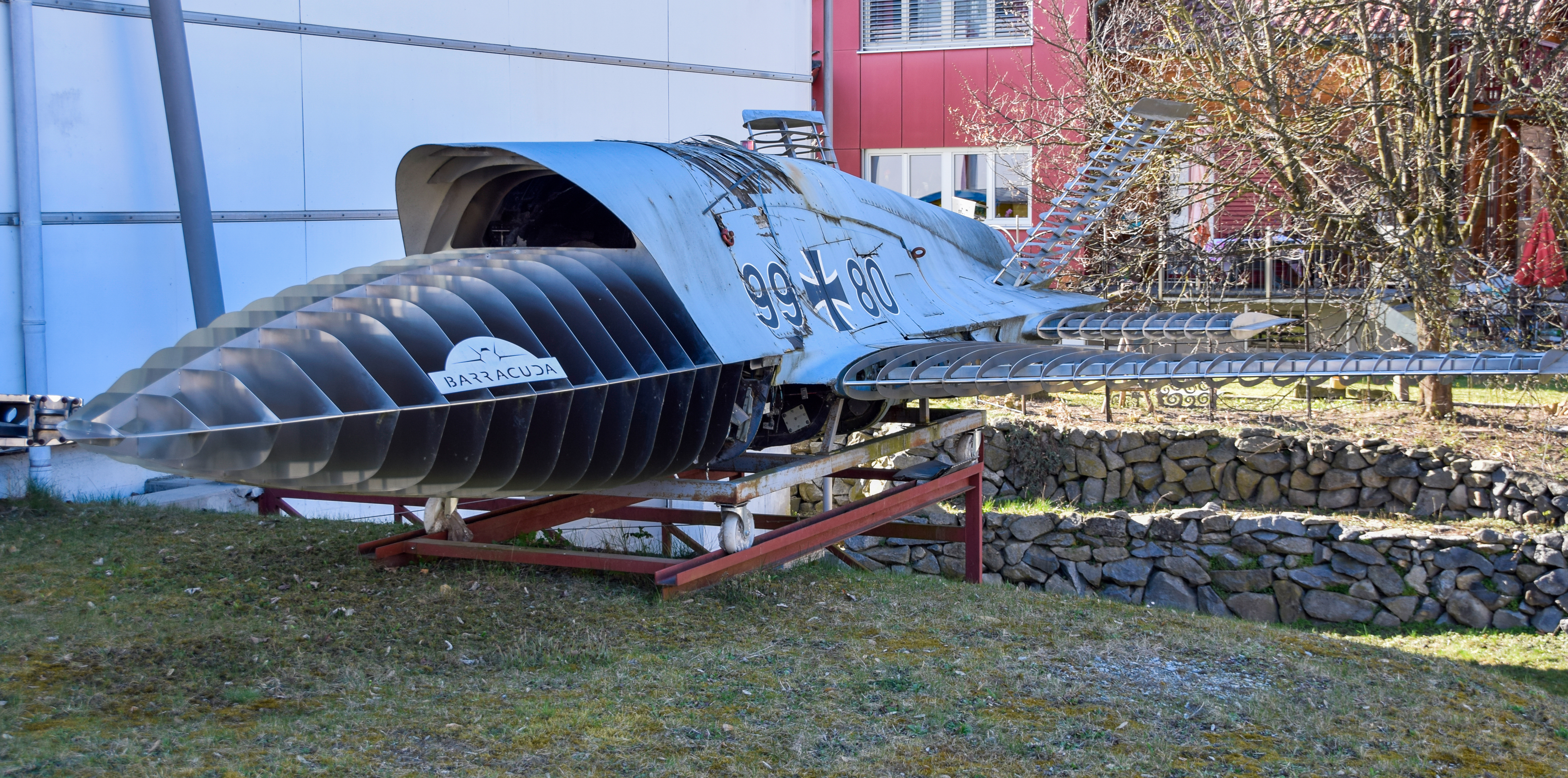
The remains of the crashed aircraft 99+80 with reconstructed wings

The Barracuda originated as a UAV design study that was intended to launch EADS into the market for medium-altitude long-range UAVs, a market that the firm viewed as having become dominated by the United States and Israel. During 2003, development of the UAV was launched, although the project's existence was a secret at that time. Reportedly, Germany and Spain were the main nations backing the Barracuda. Development was primarily financed by Airbus, as well as a variety of public institutions, including the German Federal Ministry of Defense, the German Procurement agency BAAINBw, and the Wehrtechnische Dienststellen. The Barracuda was officially debuted at the 2006 International Aerospace Exhibition, where the military applications and specifications for the UAV were revealed. Around this time, the Barracuda was claimed to be the largest UAV to have been produced in Europe.

At one stage, there were ambitions aired for the Barracuda to be developed as a modular platform that would be capable of being refitted to perform various roles, including maritime patrol. While the development of direct offensive capabilities were never scheduled to take place, the Barracuda could potentially carry weapons if a customer expressed interest in having such a capability. It was speculated that weapon systems could be installed within the Barracuda's central payload bay.

During July 2006, it was reported that Germany had held discussion on forming a partnership with Sweden and Italy to jointly collaborate on a multinational UAV that was independent of the French-led Dassault nEUROn programme. At the time, Spain, Italy and Sweden were already participants in the French-led effort. The Barracuda and the nEUROn were both stealthy aircraft and had a maximum air speed of around Mach 0.85.

On 23 September 2006, the Barracuda crashed in Mar Menor at Region de Murcia, Spain, during a landing approach towards the end of an otherwise-regular test flight; in response to the accident, development was temporarily placed on hold until 2008. The program was resumed in 2008, with a second prototype being completed in November 2008. During 2009, a series of successful flight tests in Goose Bay, Canada, were performed by the Barracuda; while the UAV operated autonomously during these flights, it was monitored from a ground station for safety purposes alone.

In 2010, additional test flights were conducted that were focused on various subsystems of the Barracuda, including its sense-and-avoid capabilities, auto-taxi systems, a structurally-integrated antenna; and an automatic target detection system. Two years later, further flights were still being performed, entirely at the company's expense; late-stage flight testing had reportedly been validating several new mission modes, including autonomous 4-D navigation and cooperative flight with a second UAV. In September 2012, EADS were reportedly exploring the possibility of an additional series of test flights in 2014.

== Design ==
The EADS Barracuda was a UAV demonstrator. Wherever practical to do so, its construction made use of commercial off-the-shelf components, but also incorporated numerous purpose-built systems as well. Its fuselage was constructed entirely from carbon fibre, that possessed a greater strength to weight ratio than traditional aircraft materials, such as aluminum (the structure of the Eurofighter Typhoon and Boeing 787 Dreamliner were also largely composed out of it). The only substantial component made of metal was the wing spar, which ran through the middle of the airframe and reinforced the wings. This spar was designed to permit the easy removal of the wings for transportation. While the Barracuda was a stealth design, the design team reportedly never performed any signature measurements.

The airframe of the Barracuda incorporated a lengthy bay that was compatible with a variety of payloads. Typically, these payloads were used for reconnaissance and observational purposes; specific systems to have been fitted include an emitter location system (ELS), a synthetic aperture radar (SAR), and an array of electro-optical sensors. With the exception of the landing gear, the Barracuda made no use of hydraulics, being instead reliant upon on electronic actuators. It reportedly had an operating ceiling of around 20,000 ft (6,096 m) and carried a maximum payload of 300 kg.

A key goal of the Barracuda was to accumulate fundamental insights for the development of operationally mature next-generation UAVs. One expressed portion of this ambition was the development of UAVs that could operate in unsegregated airspace alongside manned and civilian aircraft. During mid-2023, Airbus stated that various technologies that had originally been used on the Barracuda have since been repurposed across multiple other platforms, including the Eurodrone and the Future Combat Air System.

== Specifications ==
Data from Army Technology

General characteristics

- Length: 8.25 m (27 ft 1 in)
- Wingspan: 7.22 m (23 ft 8 in)
- Empty weight: 2,300 kg (5,071 lb)
- Max takeoff weight: 3,250 kg (7,165 lb)
- Powerplant: 1 × Pratt & Whitney JT15D turbofan engine, 14 kN (3,100 lbf) thrust

Performance

- Maximum speed: 1,041 km/h (647 mph, 562 kn)
- Maximum speed: Mach 0.85
- Range: 200 km (120 mi, 110 nmi)
- Service ceiling: 6,100 m (20,000 ft) ~

== See also ==
Aircraft of comparable role, configuration, and era

- BAE Systems Taranis
- Dassault nEUROn
- General Atomics Avenger
- Kratos XQ-58 Valkyrie
- Lockheed Martin RQ-3 DarkStar
- BAE Systems Corax
- HAL CATS Warrior
