= BAE Systems Ampersand =

Ampersand

General information
- Type: UAV autogyro
- National origin: United Kingdom
- Manufacturer: BAE Systems

History
- Developed from: RotorSport UK MT-03

The BAE Systems Ampersand unmanned autonomous system (UAS) is an unmanned autogyro technology demonstrator, first announced at the 2008 Farnborough International Air Show. The Ampersand is based on the RotorSport UK MT-03 autogyro, with a sensor suite derived from the BAE Herti UAV. It is capable of being flown manned, for flight test purposes.

== See also ==
- Unmanned aerial vehicle

Related development

- BAE Systems Corax
- BAE Systems GA22
- BAE Systems HERTI
- BAE Systems Mantis
- BAE Systems Taranis

Related lists

- List of unmanned aerial vehicles
