= BAE Systems GA22 =

GA22

General information
- Type: UAV
- National origin: United Kingdom
- Manufacturer: BAE Systems

The BAE Systems GA22 is an unmanned airship demonstrator programme in response to a need for low cost, long endurance UAV platform. Lindstrand Technologies is a major contributor to the programme.

== Development ==
The original design has been updated allowing it to carry payloads such as high-tech surveillance equipment up to 150 kg (330.69 lbs) in weight and to heights of more than 6,500 ft (1981.2m). The GA22 is also being made from newer and lighter materials in an aim to improve its performance. As of 2008 the airship is radio controlled, but BAE plan to make it fully autonomous.

BAE believe that the redevelopment of the airship will allow it to be deployed into a diverse range of roles such as monitoring forest fires or acting as communications relay station.

== Specifications ==
- Length: 24 m (78.74 ft)
- Width: 7.8 m (25.59 ft)
- Height: 9 m (29.53 ft)
- Max takeoff weight: 720 kg (1587.33 lbs)
- Cruising flight speed: 50 km/h (31.07 mph)
- Max flight speed: 60 km/h (37.28 mph)

== See also ==
- Unmanned aerial vehicle

Related development

- BAE Ampersand
- BAE Corax
- BAE HERTI
- BAE Taranis
- BAE Mantis

Related lists

- List of unmanned aerial vehicles
