= Herti =

Herti, or HERTI, may refer to:

- BAE Systems HERTI, an unmanned aerial vehicle developed by the British company BAE Systems
- Herti, Schwyz, a village in the municipality of Unteriberg, Schwyz, Switzerland
