= Future of the Royal Air Force =

British plans for the air defence

The planning for the future of the Royal Air Force involves supporting ongoing British military operations and the introduction of new aircraft types including unmanned aerial vehicles and the BAE Systems Tempest sixth-generation fighter in the 2030s. Priorities include greater focus on network enabled capability and mixing crewed fighter jets with UAVs and swarming drones.

The new initiative will focus on increasing interoperability with members of NATO and becoming carbon net-zero, with strategies such as using sustainable aviation fuels in aircraft. The Prime Minister has announced that twelve F-35As will be acquired in-part to deploy U.S. tactical nuclear weapons to bolster deterrence through NATO nuclear sharing.

== Combat Air ==
=== F-35 Lightning II ===
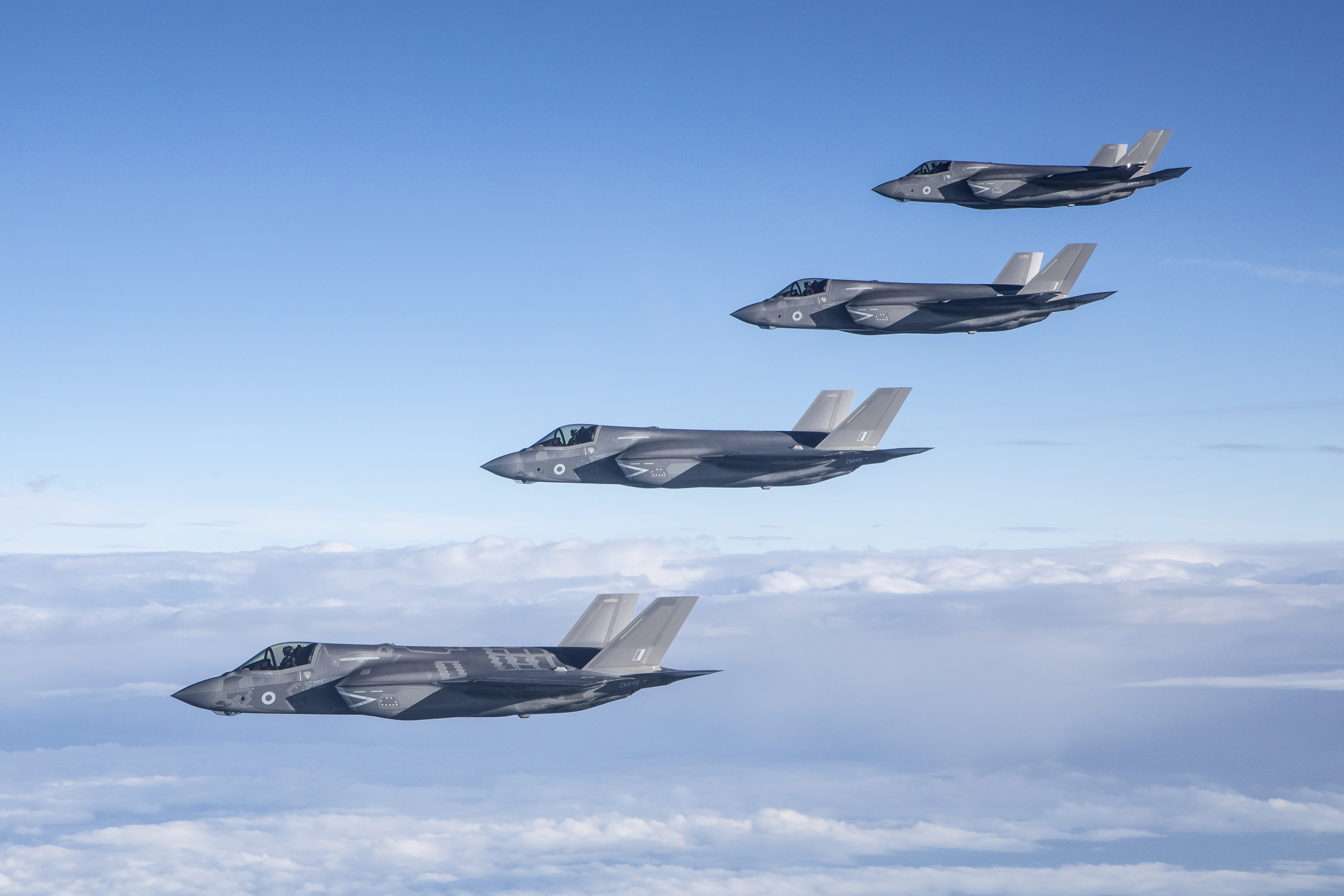
A quartet of Royal Air Force F-35Bs in flight.

The Lockheed Martin F-35 Lightning II is a family of single-seat, single-engine, fifth generation multirole fighters under development to perform ground attack, reconnaissance, and air defence missions with stealth capability. It was selected for the UK's Joint Combat Aircraft requirement in 2001, having been selected initially to replace the Royal Navy's BAE Sea Harrier fighter, and latterly the existing Panavia Tornado GR.4 and Harrier GR.9 fleets (the latter already having been retired in late 2010), operating principally from the Queen Elizabeth-class aircraft carriers. It will be the main component of the RAF's manned strike capability, and marks the return of a carrier-borne strike capability for the Fleet Air Arm for the first time in nearly a decade.

The version initially selected was the Short Take Off Vertical Landing (STOVL) variant of the F-35, known as the F-35B. In October 2010, David Cameron announced that the UK would change their order to the F-35C CATOBAR carrier variant for both the RAF and Navy. The F-35C variant features larger wings with folding wingtips and larger wing and tail control surfaces for improved low-speed control. This gives it a greater range and the ability to carry a larger and more diverse payload than the F-35B.

In May 2012, it was announced that the government had reverted to the previous plan to operate the STOVL F-35B, due to rising estimated shipbuilding costs associated with the CATOBAR variant F-35C, and an earlier estimated in-service date for the F-35B.

The delivery of the UK's first F-35B was made on 19 July 2012 at Fort Worth, Texas, for flight trials by the RAF and Royal Navy.

In 2015, the government's Strategic Defence and Security Review stated that the Government planned to order 138 F-35s, with 24 of them to be available for carrier duties by 2023. The 2021 defence white paper cut that number to "more than 48", with the First Sea Lord stating that the objective would be to increase the order to 60 initially and then "maybe more up to around 80". It was hoped that 4 deployable squadrons (combined RAF and Royal Navy) might still be formed. On 10 January 2019, initial operating capability for the UK's F-35B was announced. The UK is committed to improving its F-35Bs to Block 4 standard, however, the actual number of improved jets is yet to be known. In April 2022, the Deputy Chief of Defence Staff, Air Marshal Richard Knighton, told the House of Commons Defence Select Committee that the MoD was in discussions to purchase a second tranche of 26 F-35B fighters. Subsequent reports, later confirmed, suggested that this second tranche order would be completed in 2033.

Plans for frontline F-35B squadrons envisage a total of three frontline (RAF and RN) squadrons each deploying 12-16 aircraft. Two F-35B squadrons have been formed so far, one within the Fleet Air Arm of the Royal Navy (809 sqn), and one within the RAF (617 sqn). In surge conditions 24 F-35s might be deployed on one of the Queen Elizabeth-class carriers, but a routine deployment would likely involve 12 aircraft.

A September 2022 reported indicated that three additional aircraft were expected to be delivered in 2022 (delivery took place in November 2022), seven in 2023, four in 2024 and seven in 2025, completing the delivery of the planned 48 tranche 1, one of which was lost in 2021. This delivery schedule was superseded, and only 38 F-35s were in the UK inventory as of May 2025. The delivery of the final F-35Bs in the Tranche 1 order was finally completed in March 2026.

At the end of 2022, Defence Secretary Ben Wallace reported that the RAF and Royal Navy also faced a considerable challenge in providing even the existing modest F-35B fleet with qualified pilots. In late 2022 there were only 30 qualified British pilots for the F-35, plus three exchange pilots from the United States and Australia. The average wait time for RAF trainee Typhoon and F-35 pilots, after completing the Military Flying Training System, was approximately 11 and 12 months respectively. A further gap of 68 weeks existed between completing Basic Flying Training and beginning Advanced Fast Jet Training.

In February 2023, the Chief of the Air Staff, Air Chief Marshal Sir Mike Wigston, stated that the number of F-35 pilots had grown to 34 UK pilots with a further 7 to complete training by August 2023. In 2025 the National Audit Office reported that a consistent shortage of pilots remained, along with other shortages including of F-35 engineers. Pilot-to-aircraft ratios were reported at about 1:1, which were argued by some to be "far below the 1.3 to 1.5 considered healthy in most air forces".

At the 2025 NATO Summit at The Hague, Prime Minister Keir Starmer announced that the RAF will acquire twelve nuclear capable F-35A fighter jets. According to the MoD, the F-35As will be based at RAF Marham and used in a training role on a "day-to-day basis", due to their increased flight time and decreased maintenance requirements. The aircraft will be available to deploy in a tactical nuclear strike role to bolster NATO deterrence and to complement the capabilities of the Royal Navy's ballistic missile submarines. It is planned that the UK's pending Tranche 2 order for F-35 aircraft will comprise 15 F-35Bs and 12 F-35As. The F-35As were planned for delivery by 2030, but the 2026 defence investment plan modified this to the "early 2030s".

In October 2025, the Public Accounts Committee stated that the MOD did not know how much it would cost to operate the F-35As with plans "at an early stage". In 2025 the MOD had more than tripled its previous overall F-35 whole-life cost estimate to the new out of service date of 2069 to £57 billion, excluding non-equipment costs such as personnel, fuel and infrastructure, following a National Audit Office audit.

While officially the U.K. was still committed to acquiring 138 F-35s, now composed of both A and B variants, these will be acquired over a thirty-year period with 74 (both As and Bs) planned to be in service by 2033. The 2026 Defence Investment Plan did not confirm the order or specific timing for 15 additional F-35B aircraft, though it noted that 12 F-35A aircraft would likely be ordered for delivery in the early 2030s.

Current and future units

- No. 617 Squadron RAF, RAF Marham

Operational Conversion Units

- No. 207 Squadron RAF, RAF Marham

Operational Evaluation Units

- No. 17 Squadron RAF, Edwards Air Force Base

=== Typhoon ===
It was indicated in the 2015 Strategic Defence and Security Review that the RAF would retain its Tranche 1 Typhoons and use them to stand up an additional two squadrons. It was also announced that the aircraft would remain in service until 2040, ten years longer than previously planned. The 2021 defence white paper announced that the Tranche 1 Typhoons would instead be withdrawn from service by 2025, apart from four based in the Falkland Islands which might be retained.

For the more advanced Typhoons remaining in service, the Government also promised to invest further in Typhoon air-to-ground capabilities and in a new active electronically scanned array (AESA) radar, as well as completing integration of the Storm Shadow and Brimstone missiles with the Typhoon. 107 Tranche 2 and 3 Typhoons will be equipped via "Project Centurion", allowing them to launch Meteor missiles, Brimstone and Storm Shadow missiles. The 2026 defence investment plan confirmed the continued investment of £1.1 billion to maintain and upgrade the services' fleet of Typhoon aircraft.

RAF Typhoon

Frontline Units as of 2021

- 1(F) Squadron, RAF Lossiemouth
- 2(AC) Squadron, RAF Lossiemouth
- 3(F) Squadron, RAF Coningsby
- 6 Squadron, RAF Lossiemouth
- IX(B) Squadron, RAF Lossiemouth
- XI Squadron, RAF Coningsby
- 12 Squadron, RAF Coningsby
- 1435 Flight, RAF Mount Pleasant

Operational Conversion Units

- 29 Squadron, RAF Coningsby

Operational Evaluation Units

- 41 Squadron, RAF Coningsby

=== Combat Air Strategy and Team Tempest ===
At the 2018 Farnborough Airshow, UK Defence Secretary Gavin Williamson announced Team Tempest, a joint program office consisting of government divisions alongside BAE Systems, Leonardo S.p.A., MBDA and Rolls-Royce that would be developing a new design of fighter aircraft with £2 billion (US$2.6 billion) in funding, by 2025. This will develop new technologies and means of production under the Future Combat Air System Technology Initiative (FCAS TI). In December 2022, the United Kingdom, Japan and Italy announced that they would merge their sixth-generation fighter projects forming the Global Combat Air Programme, with the fighter entering service from 2035.

The 2026 Defence Investment Plan announced the investment of £8.6 billion into the multinational Global Combat Air Programme for the development of a next generation combat aircraft. An additional £300 million would also be allocated the for development of collaborative combat aircraft to operate alongside the aircraft. At the same time, the previously envisaged "future combat air system" seemed unlikely to move forward.

On 26 October 2026, Chief of the Air Staff Harv Smyth gave a speech setting out RAF strategy, which had been instructed to be ready to fight against Russia by 2030. He stated that technological change would revolutionise warfare, limiting the role of military personnel "towards the outside" and ease the pressure on recruitment. As an example he indicated that Typhoon fighters would be accompanied by four AI-enabled drones patrolling hundreds of miles away. Smyth predicted that "AI will enable warfare that speeds well beyond human comprehension, meaning that our role will shift towards the outside, and it will shift towards controlling the activity and setting the guardrails".

== Intelligence, surveillance, target acquisition, and reconnaissance ==
=== Wedgetail ===
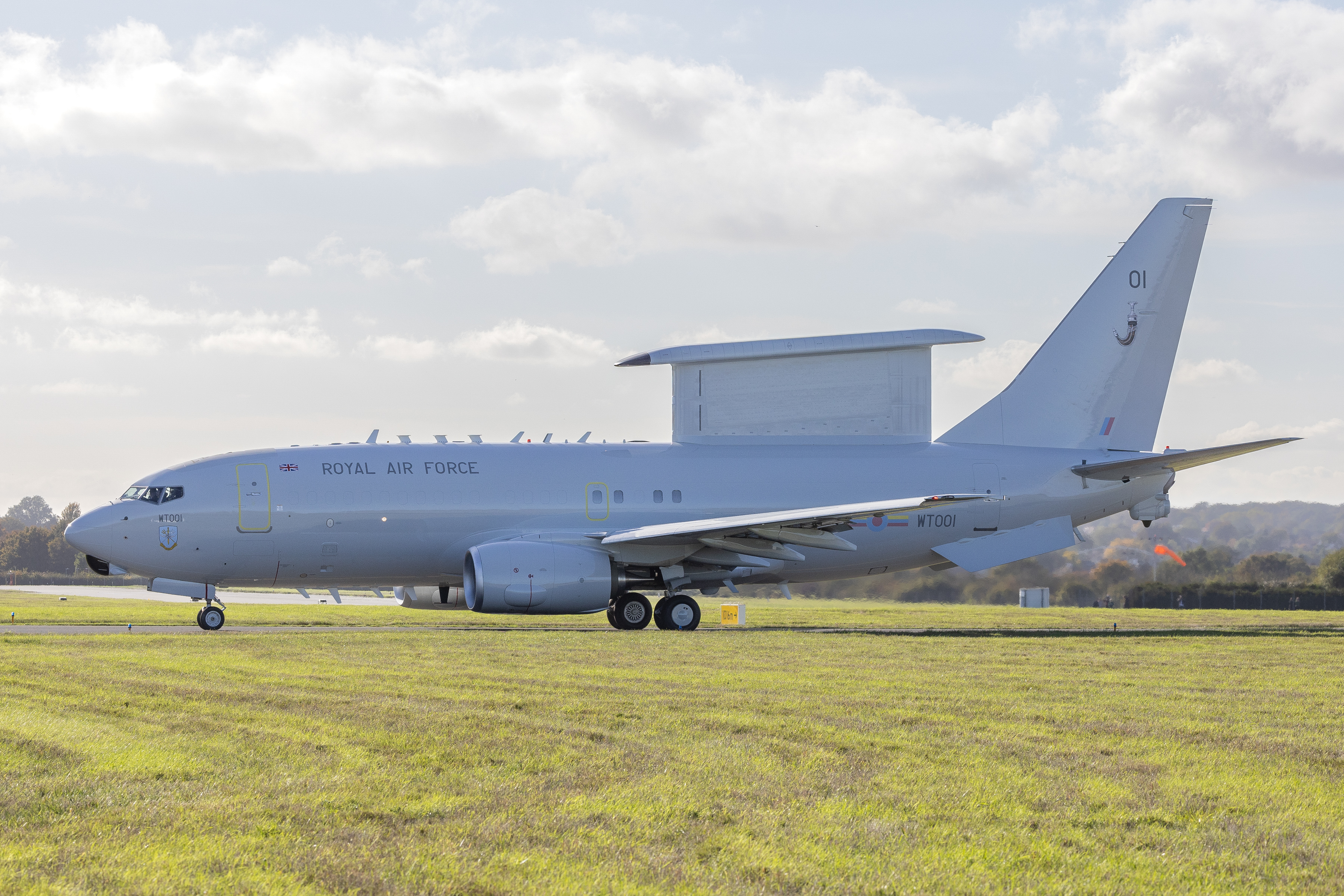
An RAF Wedgetail.

In 2018, the RAF announced plans to upgrade its airborne early warning facility. Initially this was planned as an upgrade of the E-3D Sentry fleet, which would mirror the Sentry Block 40/45 upgrade undertaken by the USAF, and subsequently fitted to the Sentry fleet of the Armée de l'Air in France. However, owing to the significant cost of such a project, estimated at approximately £2 billion, it was thought that it would be more cost-effective to procure a new system instead. Although there were calls for an open competition to select the new platform, most notably from a partnership between Airbus and Saab, which would feature the Swedish company's Erieye radar system combined with an Airbus aircraft, the Ministry of Defence was announced as being in talks with Boeing over procuring its E-7 Wedgetail aircraft.

To this end, in August 2018 the RAF began sending personnel to Australia to undergo training on the E-7, which was already in service with the RAAF. The potential selection of the E-7 was seen as advantageous in part due to its level of commonality with the P-8 Poseidon, which the RAF had selected as its new maritime patrol aircraft, as well as enabling greater co-operation with the RAAF. In October 2018, Gavin Williamson, announced that the Government had begun negotiations with Boeing, having determined that the E-7 "represents the best value for money option for the UK against need". A deal was signed in March 2019 that will see the RAF procure five E-7 aircraft for approximately £1.5bn.

The 2021 defence white paper cut the number of aircraft to three. These will be based at RAF Lossiemouth alongside the Boeing P-8 Poseidon, and were initially due to enter service in 2023. With the E-3 Sentry having been withdrawn in 2021, this would leave a two-year capability gap that would see the United Kingdom rely on the NATO Airborne Early Warning and Control Force until the E-7 is operational. As of early 2024, the in-service date for the aircraft had been delayed to the end of 2025, which subsequently slipped further into 2026 resulting in a five-year capability gap. The 2025 defence review recommended that the RAF acquire additional aircraft; a recommendation that the government appeared to accept. However, the 2026 defence investment plan made no mention of acquiring any additional aircraft.

Current and Future Units

- 8 Squadron, RAF Waddington

== Transport and air-to-air refuelling ==
=== Atlas ===
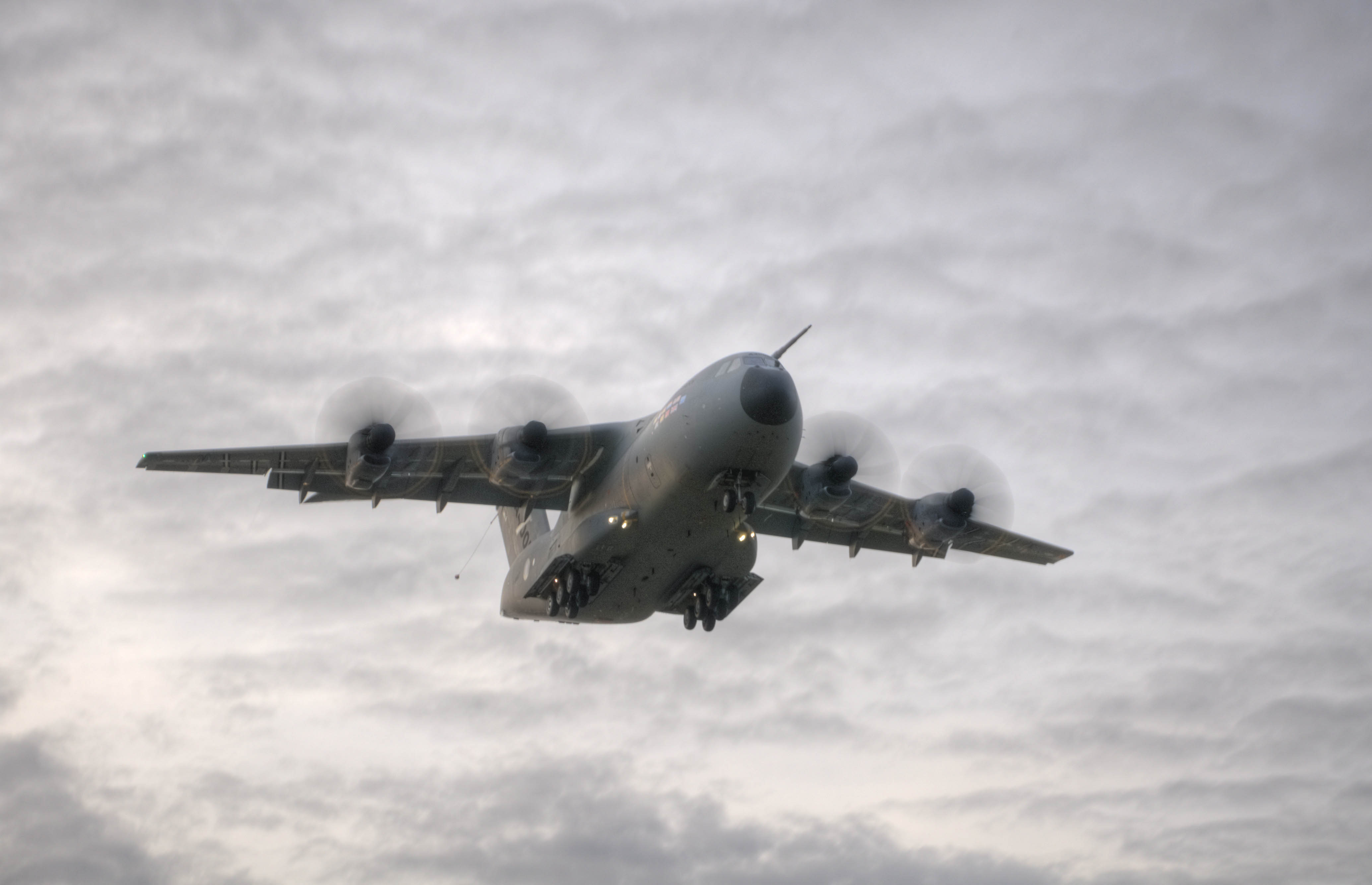
The first A400M on final approach, during its fourth flight on 15 January 2010.

22 Airbus A400M Atlas aircraft have been procured to replace the Lockheed Hercules C4/C5 (C-130J) aircraft, which was withdrawn from service in 2023.

The A400M is increasing the airlift capacity and range compared with the older versions of the Hercules it was originally set to replace. Cargo capacity is expected to double over existing aircraft, both in payload and volume, and range is increased substantially as well. The cargo box is 17.71 m long excluding ramp, 4.00 m wide, and 3.85 m high. The height is 4.00 m aft of the wing and the ramp is 5.40 m long. The Airbus A400M will operate in many configurations including cargo transport, troop transport, Medical evacuation, and electronic surveillance. The aircraft is intended for use on short, soft landing strips and for long-range, cargo transport flights.

In February 2023, the Chief of the Air Staff, Air Chief Marshal Sir Mike Wigston, reported that the RAF hoped to acquire up to six additional A400M aircraft later in the decade, in part to replace the capabilities formerly provided by the RAF's C-130 fleet. The 2025 defence review then modified that plan to either acquire more A-400Ms or to procure additional capacity in partnership with private sector providers. However, the 2026 defence investment plan made no mention of acquiring any additional aircraft.

Current and future units

- 70 Squadron, RAF Brize Norton
- 30 Squadron, RAF Brize Norton (expected to be the second operational squadron following retirement of part of the Hercules fleet)

Operational Conversion Units

- 24 Squadron, RAF Brize Norton

Operational Evaluation Units

- 206 Squadron, RAF Brize Norton

=== Envoy IV ===
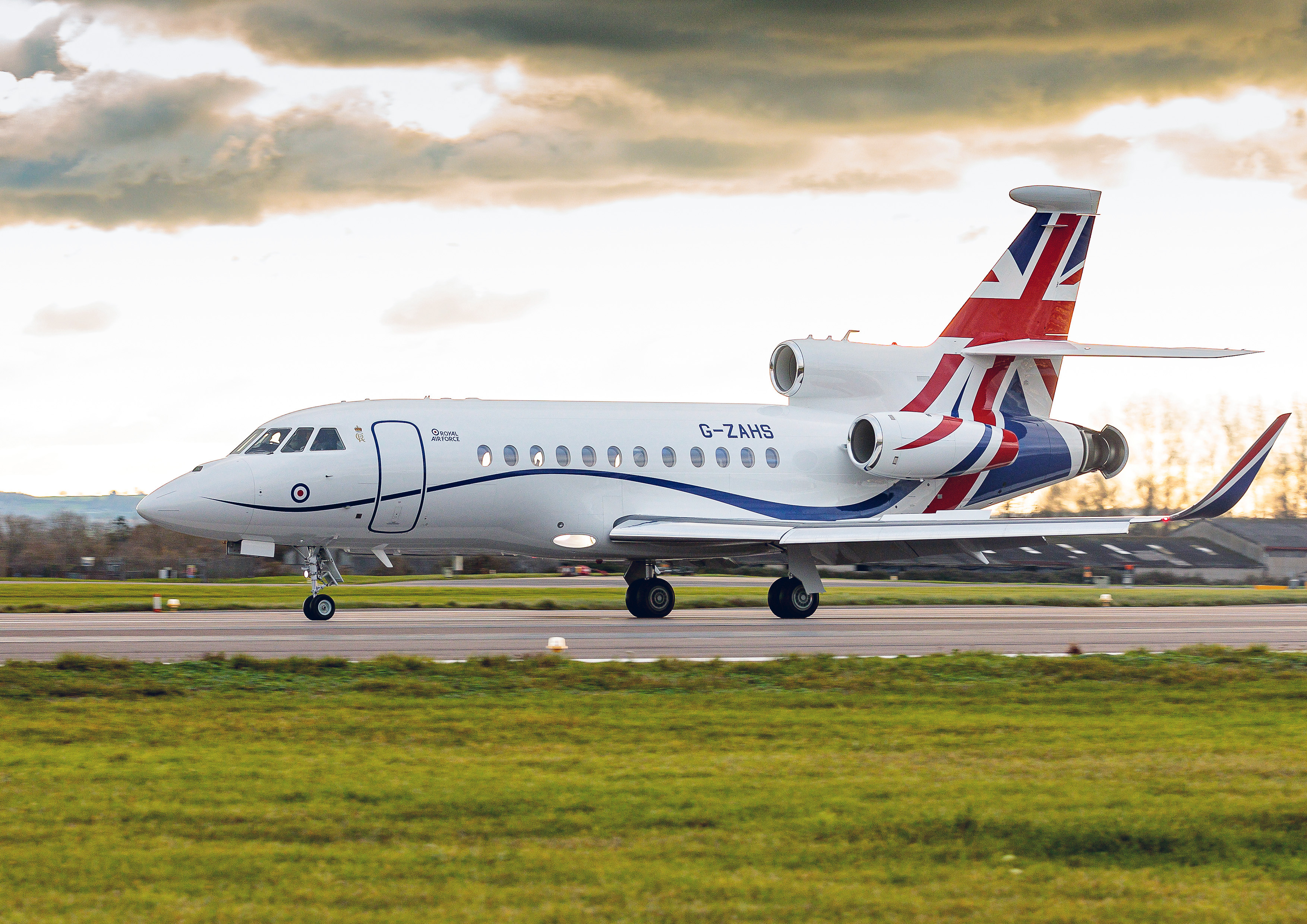
Dassault Envoy IV CC1 from No. 32 (The Royal) Squadron

In September 2021, it was announced that the four BAe 146 aircraft operated by No. 32 Squadron primarily in the Command Support Air Transport role would be withdrawn by the end of March 2022. In February 2022, it was announced they would be replaced by a pair of Dassault Falcon 900LX. The aircraft would be known as the Envoy IV and would initially be operated under a joint civilian / military operation.

The aircraft will receive a package of defensive systems and military communications for use by RAF personnel, but will be civilian registered until 2026, with civilian flight crews, during which period RAF crews would be trained, with a view to the aircraft subsequently being transferred to the military register from July 2026 and operated wholly by military crews. As of June 2026 this work has been paused.

Current and Future Units

- No. 32 (The Royal) Squadron RAF, RAF Northolt

== Helicopters ==
=== New Medium Helicopter ===
New Medium Helicopter (NMH) is a programme to procure a new medium-lift support helicopter to replace the RAF's Puma HC2 and three other helicopter types operated by the British Army. The AgustaWestland AW149 has been selected for delivery starting in around 2030 with 23 aircraft being acquired. Additionally, 6 Airbus H145 Jupiter HC.2 helicopters were acquired to support British Forces Brunei and Cyprus with delivery starting in 2026.

The 2026 Defence Investment Plan indicated that all HC.Mk 6A variants of the CH-47 Chinook helicopter will be retired from service, while 14 new CH-47-ER variants will be introduced starting in 2027. This will reduce the planned Chinook fleet to around 36 helicopters.

== Unmanned Aerial Vehicles ==
The MOD Uncrewed Systems Centre, based at the covered 50,600 square metres (545,000 sq ft) DroneTEX facility in Swindon, supporting the rapid development and fielding of new small UAVs was opened in June 2026 in a former Honda car manufacturing plant. Several new military drone manufacturing companies have been established in the area.

=== Protector RG1 ===
The Protector programme (formerly known as Scavenger) will supply a next-generation medium-altitude, long-endurance (MALE) UAV to replace the current General Atomics MQ-9 Reaper UAVs.

In June 2011, BAE Systems and Dassault Aviation announced they would collaborate on an aircraft called Telemos. In 2012, the project was effectively abandoned after Dassault pursued a collaboration with EADS Cassidian and Alenia Aermacchi instead.

In October 2015, the Prime Minister, David Cameron, announced the purchase of more than 20 Protector UAVs, which would be delivered by the end of the decade. This was confirmed in the 2015 Strategic Defence and Security Review. As of mid-2018, the in-service date had slipped to 2024. The exact platform selected for Protector was not disclosed, but in February 2016, General Atomics Aeronautical Systems claimed that it would be a Certifiable Predator B.

The Ministry of Defence later confirmed that it would be an enhanced variant of Predator B, designed to be compatible with NATO airworthiness standards, and that it would also come with the extended wing and fuel tanks of the ER (Extended Range) version, giving an increased endurance of over 40 hours. In April 2016, the Ministry of Defence confirmed it would seek to acquire the Certifiable Predator B through a Foreign Military Sales contract with the U.S. Department of Defense. It was indicated that at least 16 UAVs would be purchased with a maximum of up to 26.

In July 2018, it was announced that this aircraft will be designated "Protector RG Mark 1" (RG1) in RAF service, and is to be delivered in 2024 when it will replace Reaper. A contract was signed in September 2019 to test the RPAS' limit and report on its performance. In July 2020, the Ministry of Defence signed a contract for three Protector UAVs with an option on an additional thirteen aircraft. The 2021 defence white paper indicated that the total number of UAVs ordered would be limited to 16. In July 2021, an order was placed for the 13 additional Protector UAVs.

According to MBDA, the RAF intends to arm the aircraft with Brimstone missiles and Raytheon UK Paveway IV precision-guided bombs.

By June 2026, the RAF had received nine of the 16 Protector UAVs ordered. The RAF announced that four had entered service, though they had not yet reached Initial Operational Capability (IOC) and are unarmed. Whole life cost of the Protector programme has increased from the initial estimate of £704 million to £1.46 billion by mid-2025.

Future Units

- 31 Squadron (1st Protector RG1 Operational Squadron reforming at RAF Waddington)
- 13 Squadron (converting to MQ-9B at RAF Waddington)
- 39 Squadron (converting to MQ-9B at RAF Waddington)

Operational Conversion Unit

- 54 Squadron

Test & Evaluation Unit

- 56 Squadron

=== Swarming Drones ===
In February 2019, Secretary of State for Defence Gavin Williamson announced that the UK will develop 'swarming drones' to defeat enemy air defences. A IHS Janes report stated that the RAF will form a new squadron to specifically control these drones.

The principal squadron in this regard was 216 Squadron, which reformed in 2020. However in March 2024, James Cartlidge, the minister for defence procurement, informed Parliament that notwithstanding its formation in 2020, 216 Squadron had "completed [no] tests or trials [of any drones] ... either in-house or with industry" since being reconstituted.

The 2026 defence investment plan announced the investment of about £240m in Project PANTHEON, the development of autonomous systems as part of the Hybrid Carrier Air Wing. "Early" trials are anticipated for jet-powered drones to operate alongside the joint-RAF/Royal Navy F-35B force under Project VANQUISH.

Current Units

- 216 Squadron, RAF Waddington

=== Lightweight Affordable Novel Combat Aircraft programme ===
The RAF's Rapid Capabilities Office was aiming for a technology demonstrator, named "Mosquito", for which contracts were placed with Blue Bear Systems Research Ltd, Boeing Defence UK Ltd, and Callen-Lenz (Team BLACKDAWN partnered with Bombardier Belfast and Northrop Grumman UK Ltd). This project originally aimed for adding unnamed capabilities to future jet aircraft. However, in June 2022, the MOD announced that Project Mosquito would not proceed beyond the design phase due to more beneficial and cost-effective "additive capabilities" being available.

== Space operations ==
In July 2019, the then Secretary of State for Defence, Penny Mordaunt, announced at the Air & Space Power Conference that a Team Artemis, a joint US-UK team will be formed to launch and research small military satellites and "launch a small satellite constellation within a year". It was announced separately that No. 23 Squadron RAF would reform as Britain's first "space squadron responsible for day-to-day space command-and-control, including the flying of satellites".

In November 2020, the Prime Minister announced the formation of United Kingdom Space Command, which will include taking over control of the Skynet military communications satellites from the Airbus Private Finance Initiative operations contract and Strategic Command.

From 2026 to 2030, the MOD financial allocation for space is £2.3 billion for satellite communications, £880 million for space-based ISR and space control, and £440 million for novel space technology. The 2026 Defence Investment Plan allocates £9 billion for new space capability from 2030 to 2035.

== Training ==
In February 2021, the RAF's Rapid Capabilities Office (RCO) signed an agreement with the aviation start-up company Aeralis to further develop the Aeralis Advanced Jet Trainer as a potential replacement for the RAF's Hawk training aircraft.

== Missiles ==
- The 2015 Strategic Defence and Security Review announced further investment into the Storm Shadow and Brimstone missiles.
- In March 2016, the Ministry of Defence extended the assessment phase contract for the Select Precision Effects At Range (SPEAR 3) missile programme, which aims to deliver a "mini-cruise missile" capable of attacking stationary and moving targets.
- At the 2019 Chief of the Air Staff's Air & Space Power Conference (ASPC), it was announced that the RAF and MoD are pursuing Mach 5 air-to-air weapons capability or hypersonic missiles carried by fourth-generation jet fighters, fifth-generation jet fighters and sixth-generation jet fighters.

== Countermeasures ==
- In September 2016, an initial £2.5m batch order for the British-developed BriteCloud DRFM jammer was placed with Leonardo-Finmeccanica. If trials of the system prove successful, it could begin to be fitted to the Royal Air Force's fast-jet fleet by mid-2017.

== See also ==
- Army 2020 Refine
- Future of the Royal Navy
- List of active United Kingdom military aircraft
