= BAE Systems Replica =

Military aircraft

Replica
- Testbed model at Warton airfield, 2014

General information
- Type: Fifth Generation Strike Fighter
- Manufacturer: BAE Systems
- Status: Development abandoned
- Primary user: Royal Air Force (intended)
- Number built: None

Replica was a design study for an envisioned military aircraft with stealth capabilities, developed by British defence manufacturer BAE Systems. It was ultimately not pursued as the British government chose to proceed with involvement in the American Joint Strike Fighter programme instead, which ultimately led to the Lockheed Martin F-35 Lightning II.

The design study was associated with the Royal Air Force's (RAF) Future Offensive Air System (FOAS) initiative, which was ultimately discontinued. A key attribute of the conceptualised aircraft was the integration of low observability features, which were intended to achieve a balance between reduced detectability and overall affordability. As part of the study, a full size model of the aircraft was constructed and was subjected to a rigorous test regime to determine its radar cross section. During early 2003, the existence of the Replica programme was revealed to the general public.

According to reports, the Replica project is known to have been worked on from 1994 to 1999. It is widely believed that Replica may have been once intended to replace the RAF's Panavia Tornado fleet from 2017 onwards. Experience and data acquired through the programme was later rolled into the Joint Strike Fighter programme (JSF), while technologies from Replica have reportedly played a role in the development of other aircraft, including unmanned aerial vehicle (UAV)s.

== Development ==
=== Background ===
During the 1980s and 1990s, various nations developed an interest in the development of a new generation of aircraft that incorporated stealth features. Considering its long term requirements and future inventory, during the 1990s, the Royal Air Force (RAF) launched the Future Offensive Air System (FOAS) programme, which sought to study various options for performing its missions, including unconventional methods along with concepts of both manned combat aircraft and unmanned aerial vehicles. British defense manufacturer BAE Systems, having taken an interest in the fledgling FOAS effort and keen to develop its technical experience in a relatively new field of military technology, quickly elected to participate. The company decided to embark upon a design study, conceptualising a stealthy strike aircraft, which came to be known by the name Replica.

In concept, it is known that Replica had not been designed with the intention of achieving equivalent detection difficulty as some of the more exotic (and extremely expensive) advanced stealth aircraft that had been produced by that point, such as the American-built Lockheed F-117 Nighthawk strike aircraft and the Northrop Grumman B-2 Spirit strategic bomber. According to international science publication New Scientist, British stealth specialists have stated of the programme that Replica's visibility characteristics had achieved the envisioned target, which involved a balance between low observability and overall affordability. It also demonstrated British expertise in the complex world of stealth technology.

The Replica programme was received with official approval and backing, funding for proceeding with development work was provided by the Ministry of Defence, as well as self-invested by BAE Systems itself. During 2003, the reported overall cost of the programme was stated to have been £20 million. During its active years, the Replica programme was carried out under high levels of secrecy; its existence was unknown to the general public until the early 2000s.

=== Model and reveal ===
During the mid-1990s, development work on the project had proceeded so far as to prompt the company to commence construction of a full-scale model of the aircraft. According to press reports, this model was completed during 1999, by which point the Replica programme had been under way for five years. According to comments issued by BAE Systems, Replica was subject to a "rigorous test programme". One of the known aims of these tests was to acquire relevant data from which to evaluate the aircraft's radar cross section, which was deemed to have been a key component of its low observability characteristics.

It is known that one major contributing factor to the overall radar signature of an airframe is the level of precision involved in both the fabrication and assembly of its components and sections into a finished aircraft. Any edges or gaps, which are prone to generating strong radar reflections, are to be typically avoided wherever possible. Replica's designers chose to approach this issue by producing a virtual model of the aircraft using computer-aided design (CAD) tools from which data was transferred directly to high precision computer-aided manufacturing (CAM) systems to produce components in the real world. This approach is known to have been used in the manufacture of the composite panels (composed of a carbon fiber reinforced polymer) which were used for the skin of the aircraft. Assembly methods employed the use of a laser projector, which aided in the correct alignment of these panels.

During early 2003, the existence of the previously secretive Replica programme was revealed to the public. This announcement on Britain’s stealth plane was made in the form of a brief statement, which was accompanied by a single photograph of the aircraft mock-up which had been declassified. Details on the purpose and specifics of the design's attributes have remained relatively scant, it is not known whether measures to minimise its infra-red, acoustic or visual signatures were used or of their effectiveness. At the time of the reveal, New Scientist speculated that technology derived from Replica would likely play a role in the development of future aircraft, potentially including both of the manned and unmanned concept aircraft which had been under consideration under the then-ongoing FOAS programme, which was seeking a replacement for the RAF's aging fleet of Panavia Tornado GR4 strike aircraft around 2017.

=== Further development ===
During February 2014, the testbed model of Replica was seen being transported around the BAE Warton test facility in Lancashire, England. During the brief 2014 sighting, the aircraft was sporting a new low-visibility coating and minor structural changes and was upside down on a platform being taken into an enclosed hangar. According to journalists, these changes were believed to be most likely to be related to the in-development unmanned Taranis aircraft, aiding in the further refinement of its design and supporting the development of new stealth coatings for the Anglo-Franco Future Combat Air System (FCAS). As of March 2014, the Replica testbed is back on its radar testing plinth at BAE Warton but now in its new paint scheme.

According to an article published by the Royal Aeronautical Society, Replica, representing a domestically developed stealth fighter and serving to showcase both Britain and BAE Systems' expertise in developing low observability technologies, had functioned as "Britain’s entry ticket to JSF at the highest level". It was alleged in this same article that the aircraft had been pursued as an insurance measure if collaboration in the American-led JSF programme had turned sour. In the aftermath of Replica, BAE Systems has participated in multiple programmes involving low observability, including participation on the F-35 and various UAV programmes, such as the Taranis UCAV demonstrator.

== Design ==
The BAE Systems Replica was a studied twin-seat strike fighter. It was equipped with various stealth features, such as the adoption of a V-tail arrangement, to reduce the aircraft's radar cross-section, as well as its weight. Externally, the airframe resembled the American Northrop YF-23 prototype stealth fighter, as well as the jointly-developed BAE Systems/McDonnell Douglas/Northrop Grumman proposal that was submitted for the United States Air Force (USAF) Joint Advanced Strike Technology (JAST), although Replica was developed independently of either of these aircraft. To fulfill the stringent requirements of the FOAS programme, Replica is believed to have been designed with provisions to accommodate an internal weapons bay, capable of carrying both ASRAAM air-to-air missiles for self-defence purposes and a number of laser-guided bombs within the 2,000 lb range.

== Tempest ==
At the 2018 Farnborough Air Show, BAE Systems unveiled a mock-up of a proposed future combat aircraft, named Tempest. The mock-up bore a strong resemblance to the Replica test model.

== Specifications (estimated) ==
- Length: 20.8 m (68 ft 3 in)
- Wingspan: 15.3 metres ( 50.34 ft)
- Height: 4.8 metres ( 15.74 ft )
- Wing area: 104 m^{2} (1,120 sq ft)
- Max take of weight : unavailable
- Max speed : unavailable
