= Lockheed Martin RQ-3 DarkStar =

Unmanned aerial vehicle

RQ-3A DarkStar
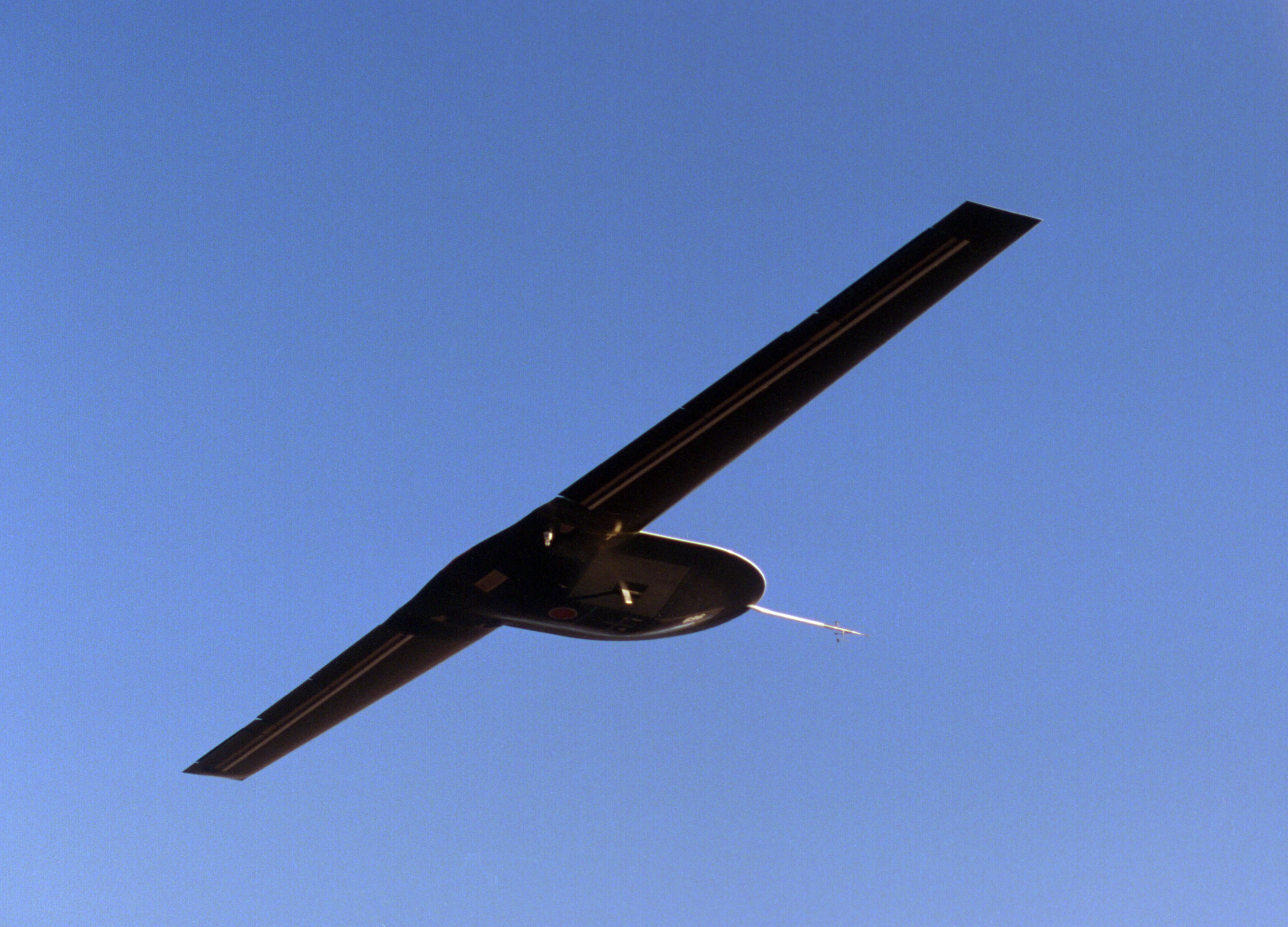

General information
- Type: High-altitude endurance unmanned aerial vehicle (UAV)
- Manufacturer: Lockheed Martin/Boeing

History
- First flight: March 29, 1996

The RQ-3 DarkStar (known as Tier III- or "Tier three minus" during development) is an unmanned aerial vehicle (UAV). Its first flight was on March 29, 1996. The Department of Defense terminated DarkStar in January 1999, after determining the UAV was not aerodynamically stable and was not meeting cost and performance objectives.

== Design and development ==
The RQ-3 DarkStar was designed as a "high-altitude endurance UAV", and incorporated stealth aircraft technology to make it difficult to detect, which allowed it to operate within heavily defended airspace, unlike the Northrop Grumman RQ-4 Global Hawk, which is unable to operate except under conditions of air supremacy. The DarkStar was fully autonomous: it could take off, fly to its target, operate its sensors, transmit information, return and land without human intervention. Human operators, however, could change the DarkStar's flight plan and sensor orientation through radio or satellite relay. The RQ-3 carried either an optical sensor or radar, and could send digital information to a satellite while still in flight. It used a single airbreathing jet engine of unknown type for propulsion. One source claims it used a Williams-Rolls-Royce FJ44-1A turbofan engine.

The first prototype made its first flight on March 29, 1996, but its second flight, on April 22, 1996, ended in a crash shortly after takeoff. A modified, more stable design (the RQ-3A) first flew on June 29, 1998, and made a total of five flights before the program was canceled just prior to the sixth and final flight planned for the airworthiness test phase. Two additional RQ-3As were built, but never made any flights before program cancellation.

The "R" is the Department of Defense designation for reconnaissance; "Q" means unmanned aircraft system. The "3" refers to it being the third of a series of purpose-built unmanned reconnaissance aircraft systems.

Although the RQ-3 was terminated on January 28, 1999, a July 2003 Aviation Week and Space Technology article reported in April 2003 that a derivative of the RQ-3 had been used in the 2003 invasion of Iraq. There has been no independent confirmation.

== Survivors ==
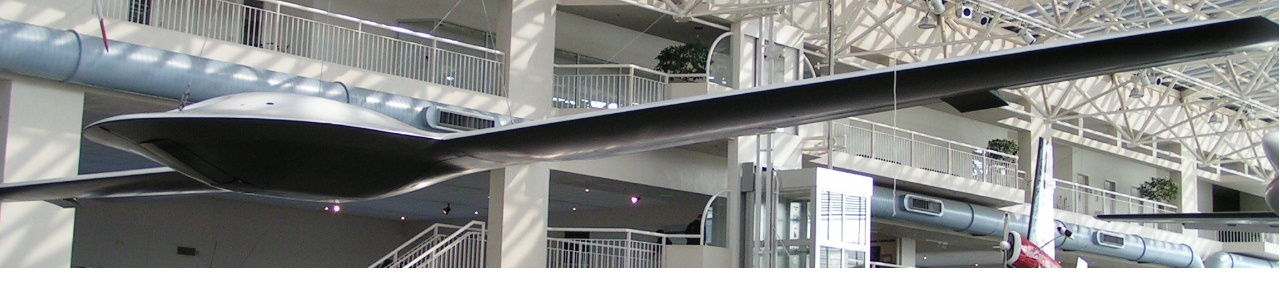
RQ-3A DarkStar on display at the Museum of Flight in Seattle, Washington

- The second RQ-3A (A/V #2) is at the National Museum of the United States Air Force at Wright-Patterson AFB in Dayton, Ohio. Although part of the Museum's Research & Development Gallery, it is displayed hanging over the C-130E in Building 4's Global Reach Gallery.
- The third RQ-3A (A/V #3) is on display in the Great Gallery of the Museum of Flight in Seattle, Washington.
- The fourth RQ-3A (which never flew before the program ended) is held by the Smithsonian National Air and Space Museum in Washington, D.C., but is not on display.

== Specifications ==
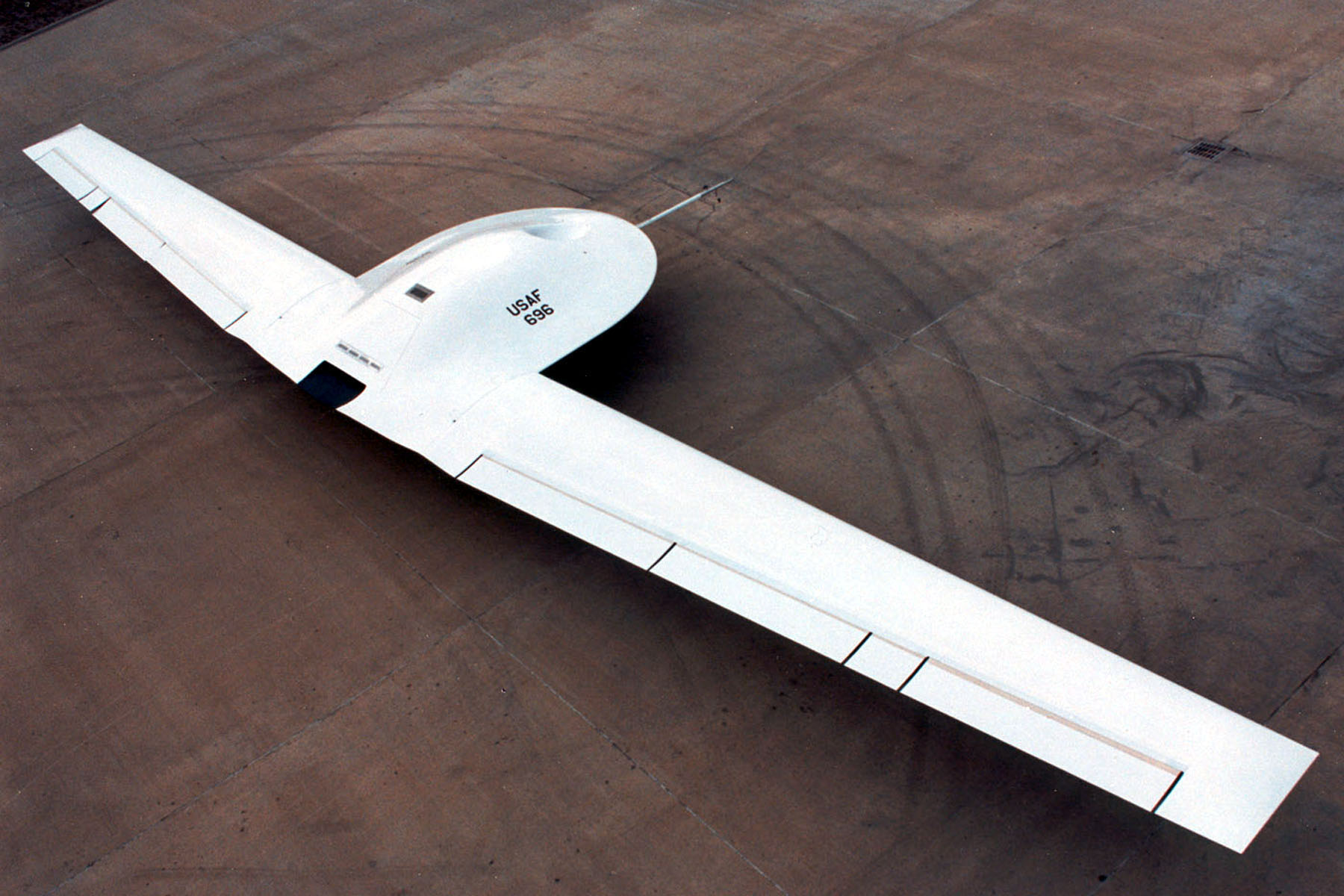
Overhead view

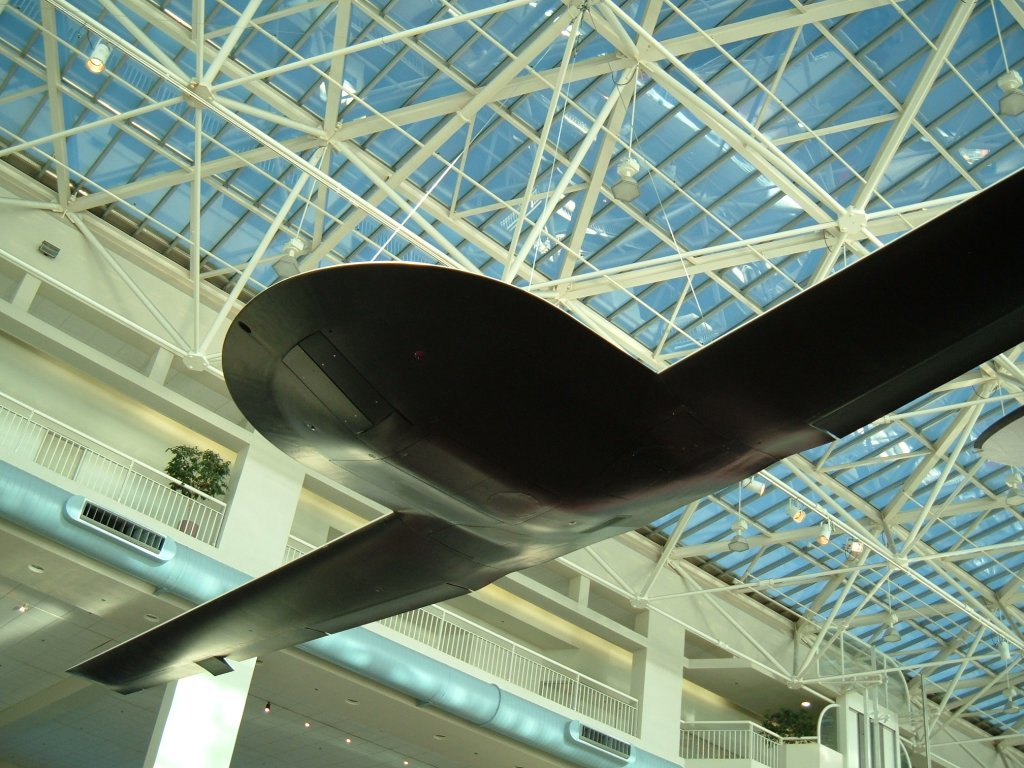
DarkStar at the Museum of Flight

General characteristics

- Length: 15 ft 0 in (4.6 m)
- Wingspan: 69 ft 0 in (21.3 m)
- Height: 3 ft 6 in (1.1 m)
- Empty weight: 4,360 lb (1,980 kg)
- Gross weight: 8,500 lb (3,860 kg)
- Powerplant: 1 × Williams-Rolls-Royce FJ44-1A turbofan, 1,900 lbf (8.5 kN) thrust

Performance

- Cruise speed: 288 mph (464 km/h, 250 kn)
- Range: 575 mi (925 km, 500 nmi)
- Service ceiling: 45,000 ft (13,500 m)

== See also ==
- Unmanned combat aerial vehicle

Aircraft of comparable role, configuration, and era

- General Atomics MQ-9 Reaper (also known as the Predator B)
- Lockheed Martin RQ-170 Sentinel
- BAE Systems Corax
- Dassault nEUROn
- EADS Barracuda

Related lists

- List of unmanned aerial vehicles
- List of military aircraft of the United States
