= Future Combat Air System (UK) =

Proposed British strike fighter

Since 2018 the UK has been pursuing its Combat Air Strategy, a key part of which is the Future Combat Air System (FCAS). As of 2021, the main output of this has been the BAE Systems Tempest aircraft concept and related technologies which will replace the Eurofighter Typhoon.

Prior to FCAS, the Future Offensive Air System (FOAS) was a study to replace the Royal Air Force's strike capability, at the time provided by the Tornado GR4. Initial operational capability was expected around 2017. The FOAS was cancelled in June 2005 and was replaced by the Deep and Persistent Offensive Capability (DPOC) requirement, which was itself cancelled in the 2010 Strategic Defence and Security Review. Various abortive projects and collaborations followed.

France, Germany and Spain were collaborating on a replacement aircraft for their Rafale and Typhoon aircraft, also titled Future Combat Air System, until it stalled in June 2026 due to the different approaches being adopted by the participant countries.

== History ==
In 1995, a Future Offensive Aircraft (FOA) was revealed, then a collaboration with Dassault, which would replace the Royal Air Force's (RAF) Panavia Tornado in the strike role. FOA became the Future Offensive Air System in December 1996, with an intended in-service date of 2015. The requirement was confirmed by the Strategic Defence Review which was published in July 1998. The concept was for a system of systems, rather than a single aircraft type. In 2004, Flight International suggested the options included "manned and unmanned combat aircraft, long-range cruise missiles, large non-penetrating aircraft and air-launched unmanned air vehicles".

In 2005, the FOAS project was cancelled and replaced by the Deep and Persistent Offensive Capability (DPOC). The 2010 Strategic Defence and Security Review announced the government's intention to switch its planned carrier aircraft from the short take-off and vertical landing F-35B Lightning to the F-35C carrier variant. The DPOC had been cancelled in July 2010, with the more capable F-35C deemed suitable to cover the resulting "capability gap". In May 2012 this decision was reversed due to the costs of modifying the Queen Elizabeth-class aircraft carriers for the F-35C.

=== Future Combat Air System ===
Earlier in 2012 the Ministry of Defence (MoD) launched a new 4-year study, the Future Combat Air System (FCAS), for future "unmanned combat air systems". BAE Systems, one of the companies involved said this would "inform the MoD's unmanned air system strategy over the coming decades to ensure that the best use is made of these new technologies".

In November 2014 FCAS transitioned to an Anglo-French feasibility study of unmanned aircraft. The British and French governments awarded 6 development contracts for FCAS; BAE and Dassault would develop the airframe, Rolls-Royce and Safran the engine, and Selex ES and Thales the electronics and communications. The collaboration benefitted from prior development of the BAE Systems Taranis and Dassault nEUROn demonstrators. In March 2016 the UK and France announced their intention to invest £1.54 billion to advance the project to its next stage.

In October 2024, The UK government has allocated £1.3 billion for the development of the Future Combat Air System (FCAS) this year, with the funding entirely from public resources and primarily directed towards the Global Combat Air Programme (GCAP). The original budget of £1.46 billion was reduced following updated industry assessments.

=== Divergent UK and French/German/Spanish projects ===
In April 2018, Dassault Aviation and Airbus announced an agreement to cooperate on the development of a stealth fighter jet as a replacement for French Rafale, German Eurofighter and Spanish F-18 Hornet, also called Future Combat Air System (FCAS) or SCAF. A test flight of a demonstrator is expected around 2025 and entry into service around 2040.

In July 2018 the MoD published its Combat Air Strategy. The key elements of this are:

- Continued development of the Typhoon.
- Implement the Future Combat Air System Technology Initiative, established by the 2015 Strategic Defence and Security Review.
- Study of Typhoon replacement programmes.
- "Build on or establish new [international] partnerships to deliver future requirements."
- Focus on affordability.

The document describes combat air as "An aircraft, manned or unmanned, whose prime function is to conduct air-to-air and/or air-to-surface combat operations in a hostile and/or contested environment, whilst having the ability to concurrently conduct surveillance, reconnaissance, electronic warfare and command and control tasks."

Also in July 2018, BAE unveiled the Tempest as the planned sixth-generation fighter for the RAF.

=== Defence in a Competitive Age ===
The 2021 Defence command paper Defence in a Competitive Age announced a £2 billion investment in FCAS and the following aspiration:

"FCAS will deliver an innovative mix of crewed, uncrewed and autonomous platforms including swarming drones. This will deliver an advanced combat air system capable of fighting in the most hostile environments. The development of novel technologies, and a step change in how we use simulators for mission rehearsal and training, will enable the Royal Air Force to be among the most technologically innovative, productive and lethal air forces in the world."
