= Flapless Air Vehicle Integrated Industrial Research =

Aviation project

Flapless Air Vehicle Integrated Industrial Research is a research project at Cranfield University with collaboration from nine other universities and BAE Systems. Funding totaling US$9.85 million comes from BAE Systems and Engineering and Physical Sciences Research Council.

The project's goal is to create aircraft without ailerons, as ailerons, in addition to being heavy and requiring extensive maintenance, make it difficult for stealth aircraft to hide from radar. The project has created an unmanned aircraft named Demon which, although it still has ailerons, also uses fluidic controls to change direction in flight. The fluidic controls, in contrast to ailerons, do not move metal parts, but instead use pressurized air to change the direction of airflow over the wing surface. The plane does not need ailerons at all, and has flown successfully without them, but they were included as a backup in case the fluidic controls failed. The project aims to eventually implement the control system on a larger aircraft.
