= BAE Systems Corax =

British experimental unmanned aerial vehicle

BAE Systems prototype Corax UAV

The Corax, also known as Raven (Corax being Latin for raven), was a prototype unmanned aerial vehicle (UAV) developed by BAE Systems Military Air & Information and financed by the Ministry of Defence.

== Design and development ==
The development of Corax took place during the early-to-mid 2000s, and was funded by the Ministry of Defence. It is known to have performed its first flight during 2004. At least one test flight had involved the execution of a fully autonomous mission, which included the aircraft both taking off and landing while remaining under computer control. Following a series of successful flight tests, BAE Systems was awarded a follow-on contract to investigate UAV safety. During December 2005, the existence of Corax was revealed to the general public.

Corax has been described by BAE Systems as a highly survivable strategic UAV platform. In terms of its general configuration, the aircraft has a single shrouded above-fuselage jet engine and features an extended wing upon which the flight control surfaces are present. Corax lacks a conventional tail, which meant that it was more challenging to control while the aircraft's overall aerodynamic performance was increased. The flight control systems were stated by BAE Systems to have been both flexible and modular.

Corax was observed to be reminiscent of contemporary stealth aircraft; it was speculated that the airframe's exterior surfaces had been specifically shaped to evade radar detection by reflecting radar away from its source rather that returning to it. The aviation author Bill Sweetman noted that Corax resembles larger aerial surveillance aircraft and that it appeared to have been designed to fly at high altitudes at a relatively slow speed. In contrast to the BAE Systems HERTI UAV, which was marketed towards both civil and military opportunities, Corax was specifically intended for defence purposes.

Corax has been reportedly superseded by the BAE Systems Taranis unmanned combat aerial vehicle (UCAV).

== See also ==
Aircraft of comparable role, configuration, and era

- General Atomics MQ-9 Reaper
- Lockheed Martin RQ-3 DarkStar
- Dassault nEUROn
- EADS Barracuda
- Lockheed Martin RQ-170 Sentinel
- BAE Systems Taranis
