= Future Combat Air System =

European sixth-generation jet fighter project

Future Combat Air System Système de Combat Aérien du Futur Zukünftiges Luftkampfsystem Futuro Sistema Aéreo de Combate
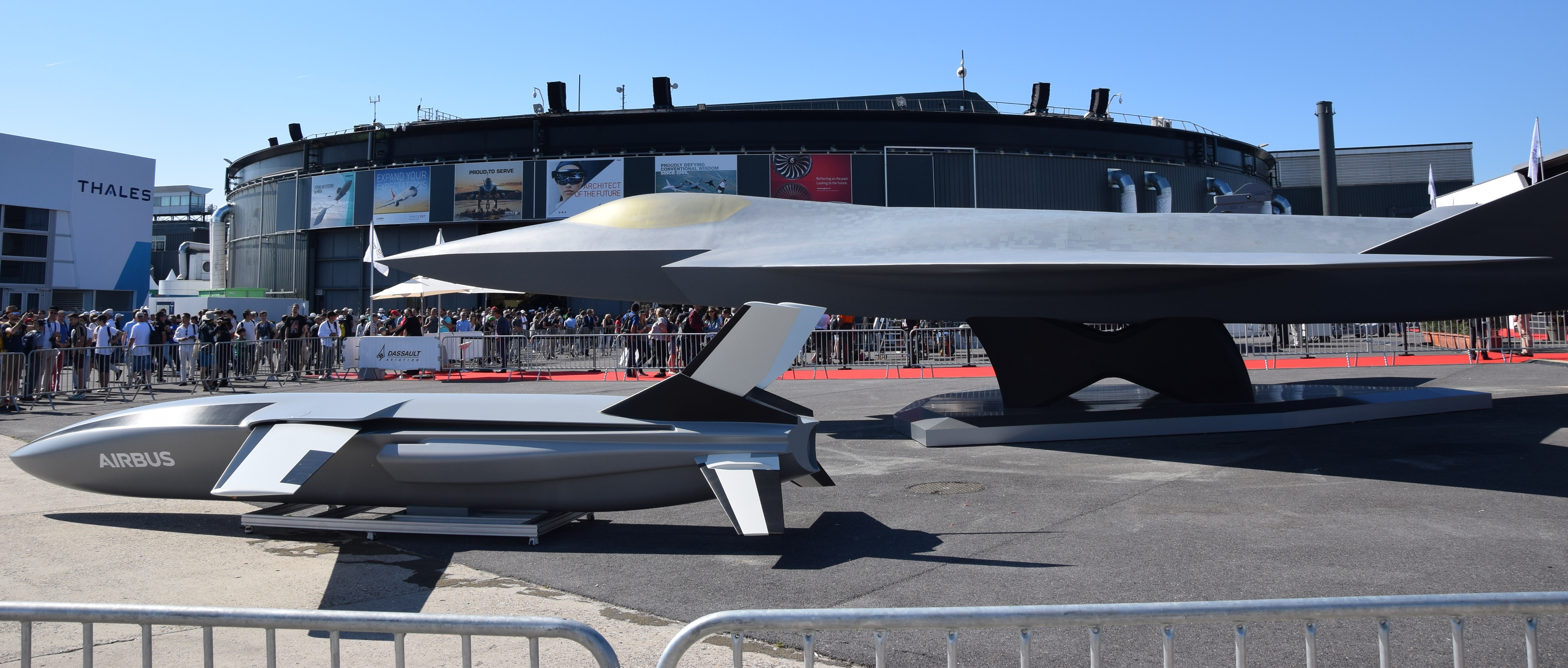
- Mock-up of the NGF and a remote carrier at the 2019 Paris Air Show

General information
- Type: Combat system of systems
- Manufacturer: Dassault Aviation (coordinator); Airbus (coordinator); Indra Sistemas (coordinator)
- Status: Ongoing ("combat cloud" data-link); Cancelled (fighter jet)
- Primary user: French Air and Space Force; German Air Force; Spanish Air and Space Force

New Generation Fighter
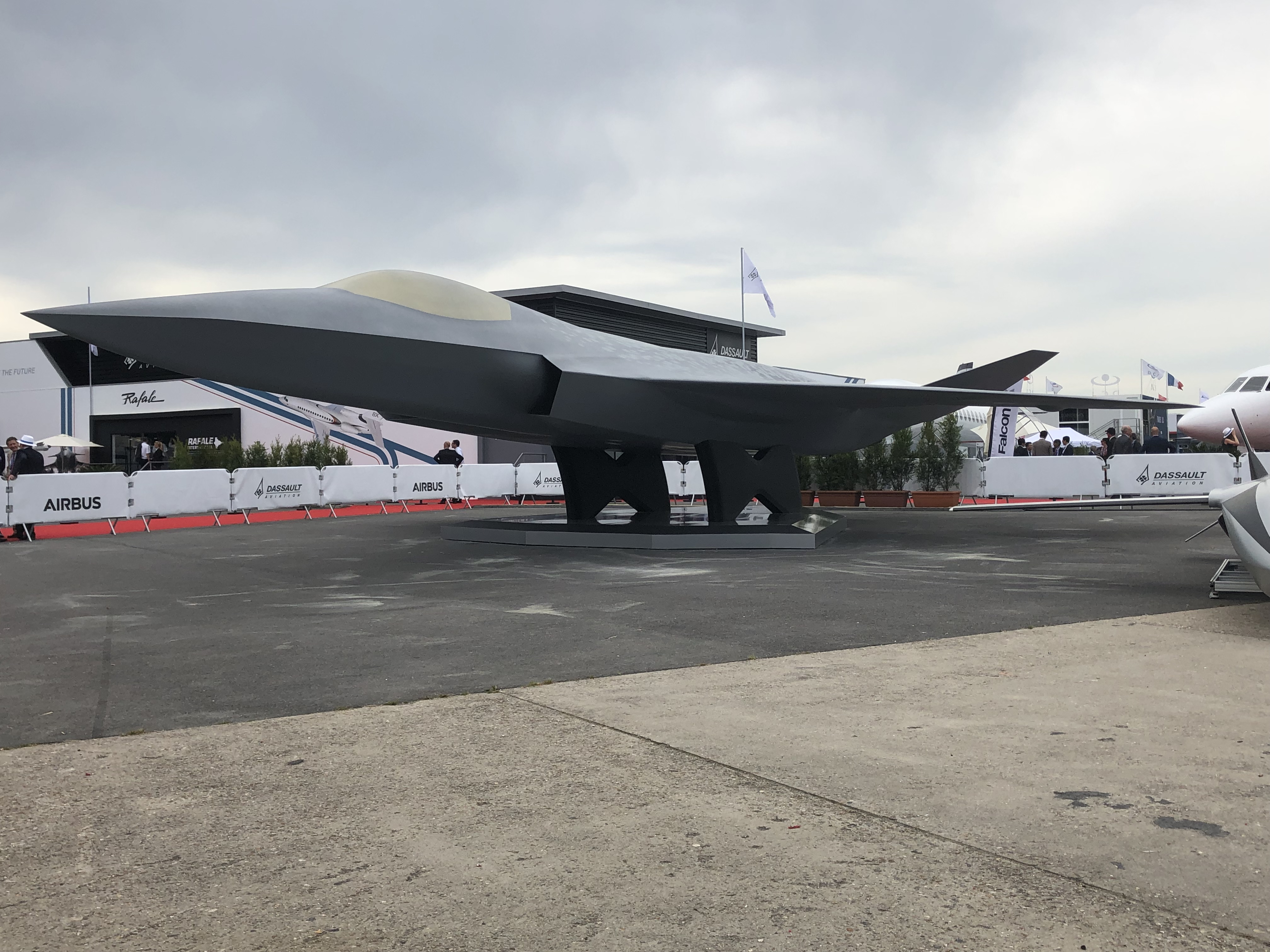
- Mock-up of the NGF at the 2019 Paris Air Show

General information
- Type: Sixth-generation jet fighter
- National origin: France, Germany, Spain
- Status: Project cancelled

The Future Combat Air System (FCAS; French: Système de Combat Aérien du Futur, SCAF; German: Zukünftiges Luftkampfsystem; Spanish: Futuro Sistema Aéreo de Combate, FSAC) was a European combat system of systems under development by Dassault Aviation, Airbus and Indra Sistemas. In June 2026, the New Generation Fighter (NGF), prime part of the project, was cancelled by Germany and France due to disagreement on several issues. However, the "combat cloud," a highly secure link, had been in doubt for months as the two sides could not solve the problems of the fighter project. This project would continue to be developed under the name FCAS. This "combat cloud" project was described by the media as a face-saving solution.

The FCAS was planned to consist of a Next-Generation Weapon System (NGWS) as well as other air assets in the future operational battlespace. The NGWS's components were planned to be remote carrier vehicles (swarming drones) as well as a New Generation Fighter (NGF)—a planned sixth-generation jet fighter—that would have possibly superseded France's Rafale as well as Germany's and Spain's Eurofighter (co-developed with the UK and Italy).

A test flight of a demonstrator was initially expected around 2027 and entry into service around 2040. According to Airbus, the first test flight of an FCAS fighter jet was planned for 2028 or 2029, together with swarming drones with all vehicles connected to each other via an information technology "combat cloud".

In June 2026 the Next-Generation Weapon System was cancelled by Germany and France.

== History ==
=== Early development and French-British program (2001–2018) ===
The FCAS concept was developed in the frame of the European Technology Acquisition Programme (ETAP) that was started in 2001 as a co-operation between Germany, France, Great Britain, Italy, Sweden and Spain. The new FCAS concept was a System of Systems (SoS) approach combining manned and unmanned systems, combat aircraft and UCAV, to be more efficient in the envisaged future scenarios than operating with manned systems alone.

Towards the end of 2010, the Lancaster House Treaties were signed by the UK and French government with the goal of increased future military cooperation. In July 2012, 13 million euros were set aside for the "preparatory phase of a future aerial combat system program"(FCAS DPPP). Then, at the French-British summit in 2014, François Hollande and David Cameron discussed the development of these systems, with most of the conversation centered around a proposed military drone. The military drone was then thought to be necessary, but there was some disagreement to the necessity of a completely new fighter jet system.

Studies were conducted and test flights were organized for the Dassault nEUROn, which first flew on December 1, 2012, and the BAE Systems Taranis which first flew in 2013. France and Britain organized preliminary studies into development of the system, with an emphasis on architecture, key technology development, and possible methods of flight simulation. The studies were supervised by the Direction générale de l'armement and entrusted to Dassault Aviation, BAE Systems, Thales, Leonardo, Rolls-Royce, and Safran Aircraft Engines.

At the French-British Summit at Amiens in March 2016, the two countries began the next step of organizing a live demo. In January 2018, there was still no confirmed demo and by 2019 the program had ceased development. In July 2018, the British announced the combat fighter Tempest developed by BAE Systems, an independently developed next generation combat fighter.

=== French-German-Spanish program (2017 onward) ===
In 2017, Germany and Spain asked Airbus to start working on a proposal for a new fighter under the name Future Combat Air System (FCAS).

At the 2018 ILA Berlin Air Show, Dassault Aviation and Airbus announced an agreement to cooperate on the development of the FCAS.

In December 2018, the German Defence Ministry welcomed Spain's expression of interest in the programme.

In June 2019, Spain joined the programme.

In December 2019, Safran and MTU Aero Engines agreed on the foundation of a 50/50 joint venture that will be incorporated by the end of 2021 to manage the development, production, and the after-sales support activities of the new engine to power the NGF.

On 12 February 2020, the first phase (1A) of the research and development program was approved by the German Bundestag budget committee. It set up the industrial distribution of the first five subprograms.

Work on Phase 1A activities concluded in early 2022.

In December 2022, Phase 1B was launched.

In June 2023, Belgium became an observer to the FCAS programme. Belgium was set to join the programme by June 2025. In May 2024 they did so. On 24 July 2025, Defence Minister Theo Francken wrote on X that Belgium is reviewing its position in the FCAS project.

In February 2026, during the 6th India-France Annual Defence Dialogue in Bengaluru, India expressed its intent to join the co-development and co-manufacturing programme. The meeting included the participation of the Indian Minister of Defence, Rajnath Singh, and French Minister of the Armed Forces, Catherine Vautrin.

=== Disagreements between Dassault and Airbus ===
Due to disagreements over the division of labor, uncertainty about its role as prime contractor for the Next Generation Fighter (fighter jet), and intellectual property, the CEO of Dassault Aviation publicly mentioned the possibility of a Plan B with a development similar to the nEUROn project when he spoke to the French Senate in March 2021.

The issue of intellectual property and a possible transfer of technology from France to Germany has led to a dispute between Airbus and Dassault. The French side feared losing its economic and technological leadership as the EU's leading aerospace company if German and Spanish companies were to jointly take over two-thirds of the development and production. In May 2021, the participating nations mutually agreed to continue the FCAS project. Several sources from the defense industry were contacted by the French business newspaper Challenges and denied that an agreement had been reached. One source described the report of an agreement as "a communication stance" and "misleading statement" by the three countries. The CEO of Dassault said there was "no agreement on the budget or intellectual property."

At the Paris Air Show in July 2025, Éric Trappier, CEO of Dassault Aviation, once again called for a larger share of the FCAS for French industry. In doing so, he called into question existing agreements on the division of tasks. He hinted at an alternative exit from the program. Shortly thereafter, it became known that Dassault Aviation had demanded to receive 80% of the FCAS workshare, which would be a significant disadvantage for the German defense industry.

Shortly thereafter, then-Armed Forces Minister Lecornu visited Germany and met with his counterpart Boris Pistorius. The German Federal Ministry of Defense issued a press release addressing issues (diplomatically referred to as “challenges”) with the FCAS and Main Ground Combat System projects. On October 5, 2025, Pistorius publicly threatened to end the FCAS project. He said he would meet with his colleagues from France and Spain as soon as the next French government was in place.

In mid-November 2025, French Defense Minister Catherine Vautrin said publicly that Germany currently did not have the capacity to build a fighter jet. Mediation between the companies failed in early 2026, with an expectation that politicians in France and Germany would then decide the fate of the project. Alternatively, some have speculated Germany and Spain could join the Global Combat Air Program (GCAP), an advanced project involving the United Kingdom, Italy, and Japan.

=== Indian intent to join FCAS ===
In August 2026, it was reported by the Indian Ministry of Defence to its Parliamentary Standing Committee on Defence, that the country is in active talks to join the FCAS programme being led by France. Previously in March 2026, the Indian Chief of Defence Staff General Anil Chauhan stated that considerations were made to either join FCAS or the Global Combat Air Programme. This is being done in conjunction with the Advanced Medium Combat Aircraft.

Illustrations of the New Generation Fighter
Interactive 3D model of the FCAS mockup shown at the 2019 Paris Air Show

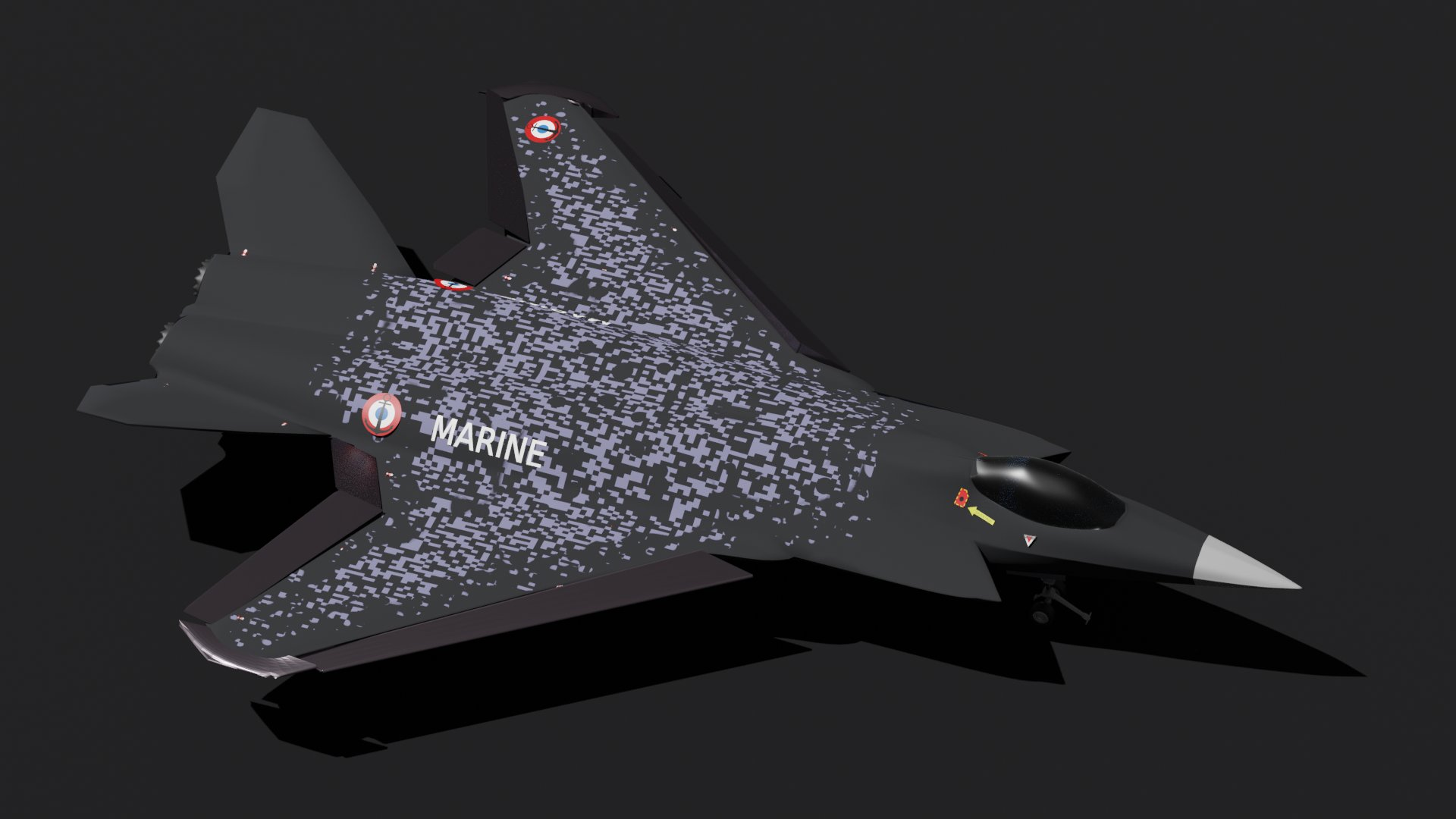
Livery similar to the illustrations published by Dassault in early 2021

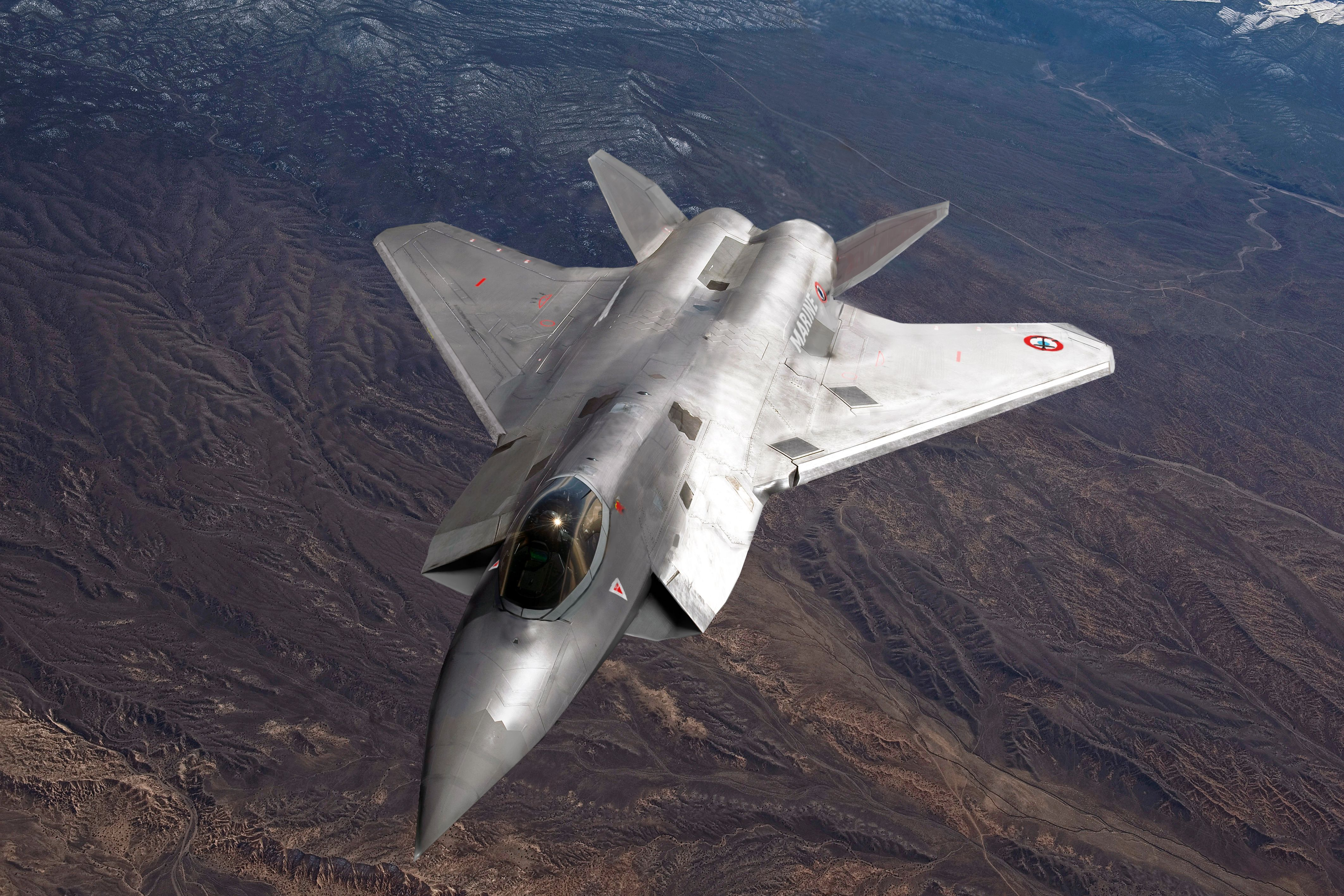
Artist's illustration of the aircraft in flight, after the project as of 2022

== Contractors ==
Dassault was planned to serve as prime contractor for the NGF (fighter aircraft), while Airbus was to lead the development of accompanying remote carrier vehicles ("drones") and the broader system's supporting "combat cloud". The aircraft would also have been carrier-capable and able to fly from the French Navy's future aircraft carrier.

Safran Aircraft Engines was to be the prime contractor for the engine of the next-generation fighter aircraft, taking the lead in engine design and integration, while MTU Aero Engines, as the main partner for the first phase of research and technology, was to take the lead in engine services.

Each country designated a national industrial coordinator, Airbus for Germany, Indra for Spain and Dassault for France.

== Development ==
=== Initial demonstrator ===
==== Phase 1A ====
Dassault, Airbus, together with their partners MTU Aero Engines, Safran, MBDA and Thales, were awarded the initial framework contract which launches the demonstrator phase. Beginning February 2020 it is expected to cover a period of 18 months of research and development. While it assigned different roles to the above-mentioned companies, Spain was left out:

- New Generation Fighter (NGF), with Dassault Aviation as prime contractor and Airbus as main partner
- Unmanned systems Remote Carrier (RC) with Airbus as prime contractor and MBDA as main partner
- Combat Cloud (CC) with Airbus as prime contractor and Thales as main partner
- Engine for the fighter aircraft with Safran and MTU Aero Engines as main partner

Work on Phase 1A activities concluded in early 2022.

==== Phase 1B ====
On 16 December 2022, Dassault Aviation, Airbus, Indra Sistemas, and EUMET signed contracts for Phase 1B of the Next Generation Weapon System (NGWS) within Future Combat Air System (FCAS) program. According to Indra, the technological development phase 1B was set to involve a contract of more than €600 million for the Spanish company, to be executed until the end of 2025. Phase 1B would lay the foundations for the following Phase 2, which would then run until 2029 and would result in flight tests, to be carried out by functional demonstrators.

On 29 March 2023, Indra, FCMS, and Thales together launched Phase 1B for the development of the connected sensor suite designed to contribute to Next Generation Weapon System (NGWS). The NGWS, consisting of the next-generation combat aircraft and escort drones, forms the core of the Future Combat Airs System (FCAS).

Collaboration within Phase 1B between Dassault and Airbus reportedly was not easy. Speaking in March 2025, Dassault CEO Eric Trappier said the key to the success of the FCAS programme was the recognition by all partners "that Dassault was the architect of the programme", and that the project could only be successful if there was a "prime contractor" (i.e. Dassault).

==== Phase 2 ====
According to FlightGlobal, Phase 1B was set to run until the partner nations signed a Phase 2 contract during 2025 to further advance the joint effort.

== See also ==
- Chengdu J-36 – (China)
- Shenyang J-50 – (China)
- Boeing F-47 – (United States)
- Boeing F/A-XX – (United States)
- Global Combat Air Programme – (Italy, Japan, United Kingdom)
- Mikoyan PAK DP – (Russia)
