= BAE Systems Tempest =

Proposed fighter aircraft concept by BAE Systems

Tempest
- BAE Systems conceptual illustration

General information
- Type: Sixth-generation fighter
- National origin: United Kingdom
- Manufacturer: BAE Systems; Rolls-Royce; Leonardo; MBDA UK
- Status: Merged into Global Combat Air Programme

History
- Introduction date: Planned for 2035

The Tempest is a sixth-generation fighter aircraft that is under development in the United Kingdom and Italy for the Royal Air Force (RAF) and the Aeronautica Militare (ITAF). The aircraft is intended to enter service from 2035, gradually replacing the Eurofighter Typhoon. It is being developed as part of the Future Combat Air System (FCAS) programme by a consortium known as Team Tempest, which includes the British Ministry of Defence, BAE Systems, Rolls-Royce, the UK subsidiary of Leonardo, and MBDA UK. £2 billion was set to be spent by the British government on the initial phase of the project up to 2025.

Both Italy and Sweden signed a Memorandum of Understanding in 2020 committing to explore collaboration on the FCAS programme. The UK, Italy and Japan announced they are working together on the joint development of engine and radar demonstrators. This was followed by an announcement in December 2022 of the Global Combat Air Programme (GCAP); a collaboration between Italy, Japan and the UK for a sixth-generation fighter aircraft. Italy has planned to spend €8.9 billion in the project up to 2035.

== Programme history ==
Strategic concept development of Tempest began in 2015. Tempest is to replace the Eurofighter Typhoon in RAF service. The RAF's Second World War Hawker Tempest fighter also followed a Typhoon. Some technology developed for Tempest will be implemented in Typhoon.

On 16 July 2018, the UK Ministry of Defence (MoD) published its Air Strategy. The key elements of that strategy are:

- Continue development of the Typhoon.
- Implement the Future Combat Air System (FCAS) technology initiative, which was established by the 2015 Strategic Defence and Security Review.
- Study of Typhoon replacement programmes.
- "Build on or establish new [international] partnerships to deliver future requirements."
- Focus on affordability.

The 2018 UK Air Strategy document describes combat air as "An aircraft, manned or unmanned, whose prime function is to conduct air-to-air and/or air-to-surface combat operations in a hostile and/or contested environment, whilst having the ability to concurrently conduct surveillance, reconnaissance, electronic warfare and command and control tasks." On the same day, 16 July 2018, the Tempest programme was introduced at the Farnborough Airshow as part of the Combat Air Strategy to maintain UK's combat aircraft development capabilities.

The maiden flight of Tempest was planned, as of 2018, to occur by 2025, with entry into service as early as 2035. By 2022, the first flight was planned for no earlier than 2026.

By late 2021, the UK-led Future Air Combat System (FCAS) project entered the Concept and Assessment phase, with an initial contract let to BAE Systems worth approximately £250 million (US$340 million) to advance the design. BAE Systems is the lead contractor for the FCAS project. While the name given to the new fighter aircraft that forms the centrepiece of the system was Project Tempest, FCAS includes a "game-changing mix of swarming drones and uncrewed aircraft" in addition to the new fighter jet. In addition, FCAS includes a new architecture for sensors, battlespace communications, networking and software.

On 18 July 2022, the UK announced that a demonstrator aircraft would be flown for the first time "within the next five years". According to the MOD press release, the demonstrator's development is already underway at the BAE Systems facility in Warton near Preston, England and it has already been flown in simulators, with a predicted prototype test flight by 2026-2027.

== Development ==
Although strategic concept development commenced in 2015, development of the Tempest hardware and software would start later.

The Tempest will be a sixth-generation jet fighter incorporating several new technologies including deep learning AI, ability to fly unmanned, swarming drones, directed-energy weapons, virtual cockpit in helmet and hypersonic weapons. £2 billion was earmarked until 2025. It was developed by a group called Team Tempest, consisting of BAE Systems, project leader and systems integrator; Rolls-Royce, working on power and propulsion; Leonardo S.p.A., working on sensors, electronics and avionics; MBDA, working on weapons; and the Royal Air Force (RAF) Rapid Capabilities Office.

In 2018 it was reported that the MoD was in talks with officials from Sweden about a common fighter jet aircraft. On 8 February 2019, it was reported that the MoD and BAE Systems planned to approach the Indian MoD and Air Force regarding collaboration for the design and manufacture of the Tempest.

In July 2019, Team Tempest said it would use a Boeing 757 as a testbed for technology developed for Tempest. The aircraft, named Excalibur, will be the only stealth fighter testbed outside the United States.

=== International involvement ===
On 19 July 2019, Sweden and the United Kingdom signed a memorandum of understanding (MoU) to explore ways of jointly developing sixth-generation air combat technologies. Swedish public service TV SVT reported that Sweden is now a part of the Tempest project, however Jane's Defence Weekly later clarified that Sweden was not formally part of the Tempest project, but is rather cooperating on the broader Combat Air Strategy. A decision on full commitment to Tempest by Sweden was expected by the third quarter of 2020.

Italy announced its involvement in Team Tempest on 10 September 2019. The Statement of Intent was signed between the UK participant bodies and Italian participant companies (Leonardo Italy, Elettronica, Avio Aero and MBDA Italy).

At the virtual Farnborough Airshow in July 2020, Defence Secretary Ben Wallace announced seven new companies were joining the Team Tempest consortium: GEUK, GKN, Collins Aerospace, Martin Baker, QinetiQ, Bombardier in Belfast (now Spirit Aerosystems) and Thales UK, along with UK universities and SMEs. The companies will develop more than 60 technology prototypes and demonstration activities. By July 2020, trilateral industry discussions between UK, Sweden and Italy had begun; also announced was an initial investment of £50m in the project by Saab and the opening of a Future Combat Air Systems centre in the UK. Saab did not however explicitly commit to Tempest.

The involvement of Italy and Sweden was confirmed by the signing of a trilateral MoU with the UK, called Future Combat Air System Cooperation (FCASC), on 21 December 2020, "defining general principles for co-operation on an equal basis between the three countries".

In August 2021 Italy announced its intention to invest €2 billion by 2035 starting with a €20 million contribution in 2021 followed by the same amount in 2022 and 2023. In the July 2022 Italian defence budget, the development of the fighter was accelerated with Italy now budgeting a spend of €220 million in 2022 and €345 million in 2023, with a forecast total investment of €3.8 billion by 2036. In October 2023 the Italian Ministry of Defence presented new budget for Parliament approval, which increases the investment forecast to €7.7 billion by 2037.

On 22 December 2021, it was announced that the UK and Japan would jointly develop an engine testbed, with the UK initially contributing £30m for design to be followed by £200m for production of the testbed. On 15 February 2022, the UK and Japan also agreed on the joint development of next-generation fighter radar demonstrator named JAGUAR (Japan And Great Britain Universal Advanced RF sensor), led by Leonardo UK and Mitsubishi Electric.

Discussions to combine efforts on Tempest with Japan's own Mitsubishi F-X fighter project as a means to cut development costs began as early as 2017. The final decision made towards the end of 2022 to merge the development and deployment of a common fighter jet under a project called the "Global Combat Air Program" (GCAP) with development shared with Italy.

== Design ==
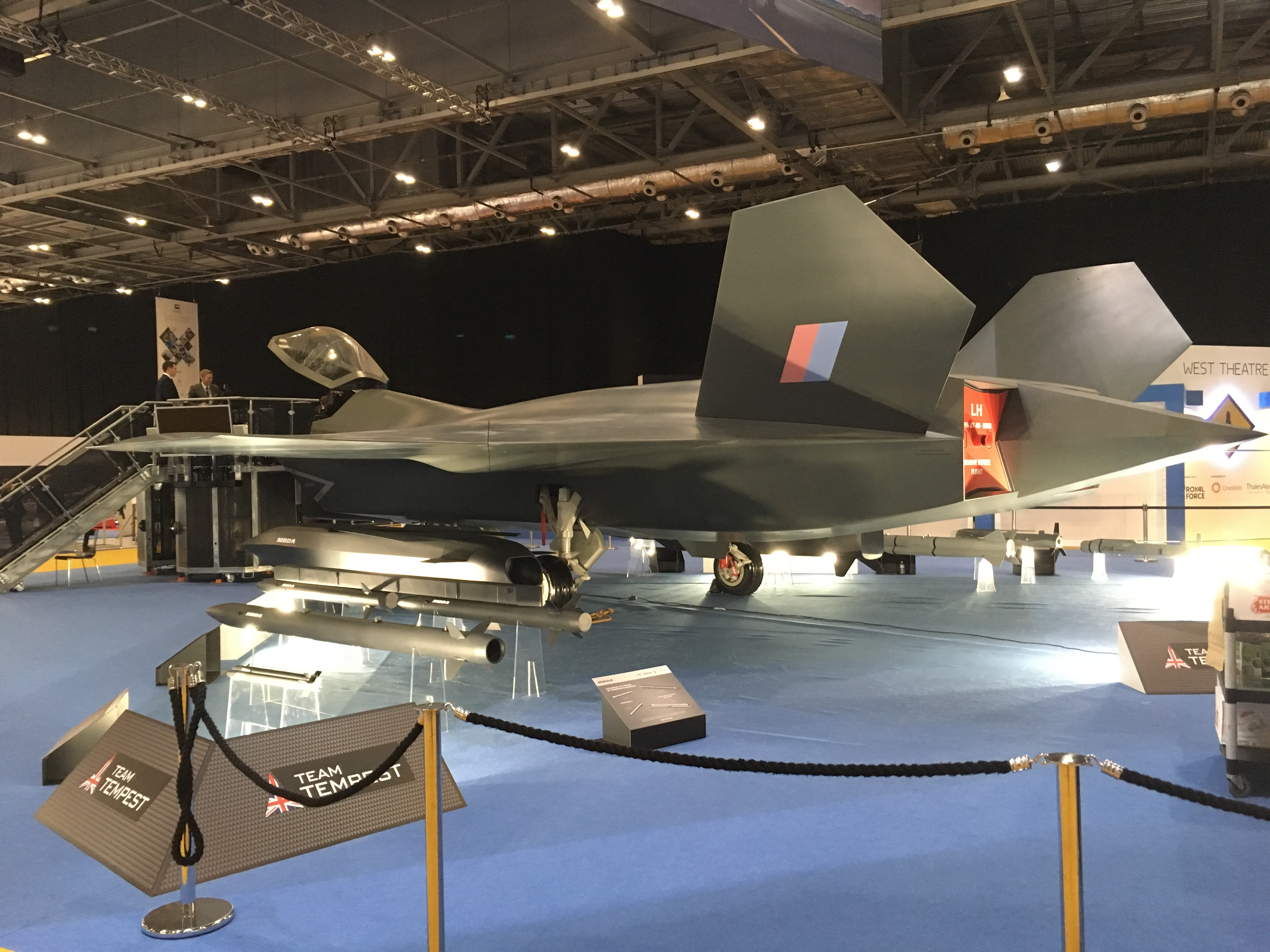
A mock-up of the Tempest at the DSEI fair in 2019

Tempest will be modular, both to be easily role-adapted to fit the particular mission as well as have easily upgradeable components during its lifetime. It has delta-wings and a pair of outwards-pointing vertical stabilisers. It will incorporate stealth technology, be able to fly unmanned, and use swarming technology to control drones. It will incorporate artificial intelligence deep learning and carry directed-energy weapons. The aircraft will have a Cooperative Engagement Capability which is the ability to share data and messages with other aircraft and coordinate actions. Tempest will feature a virtual cockpit shown on a pilot's helmet-mounted display using a Striker II unit, and an adaptive cycle engine that utilises composite materials and improved manufacturing process to be lightweight and have better thermal management while still keeping costs low.

Leonardo has proposed a radar warning receiver that is four times as accurate at 1/10th of the size of current units.

The aircraft has a slightly raised rear fuselage section, to accommodate “S-shaped” ducting behind its twin-engine inlets, to reduce its frontal radar cross-section. Its two engines are placed deep inside the fuselage to minimise radar and infrared signatures.

The aircraft is planned to have two electrical generators that provide ten times more electrical power than the Typhoon's. The generator is embedded in the engine core, also eliminating the need for a gearbox. The spool mounted generator serves as a starter for the jet engine, eliminating the need for a mechanical or compressed-air starting system, and may also be used to enhance engine performance.

It is suggested that the pilot's helmet would monitor brain signals and other medical data, amassing a unique biometric and psychometric information database for each pilot, that will grow the more the pilot flies. The aircraft's AI would work in conjunction with the database to assist the pilot, for example taking over flight controls if the pilot experiences G-LOC or increasing its own workload when the pilot is over-loaded or under increased stress e.g. taking over terminal guidance after weapon deployment if the pilot's attention is focused on a more imminent threat to the aircraft. The AI is also intended to act as a gatekeeper, to parse the overwhelming quantity of sensor and intelligence data collected by the aircraft to identify key threats, whilst also throttling the rate at which processed data is provided to the pilot, to prevent the pilot being overloaded.

== See also ==
- BAE Systems Replica
- Lockheed Martin FB-22
- F/A-XX program
- Flygsystem 2020
- Future Combat Air System
- Future of the Royal Air Force
- HAL Combat Air Teaming System
- Mikoyan PAK DP
- Next Generation Air Dominance
