= BAE Systems Taranis =

Prototype British military drone

Taranis
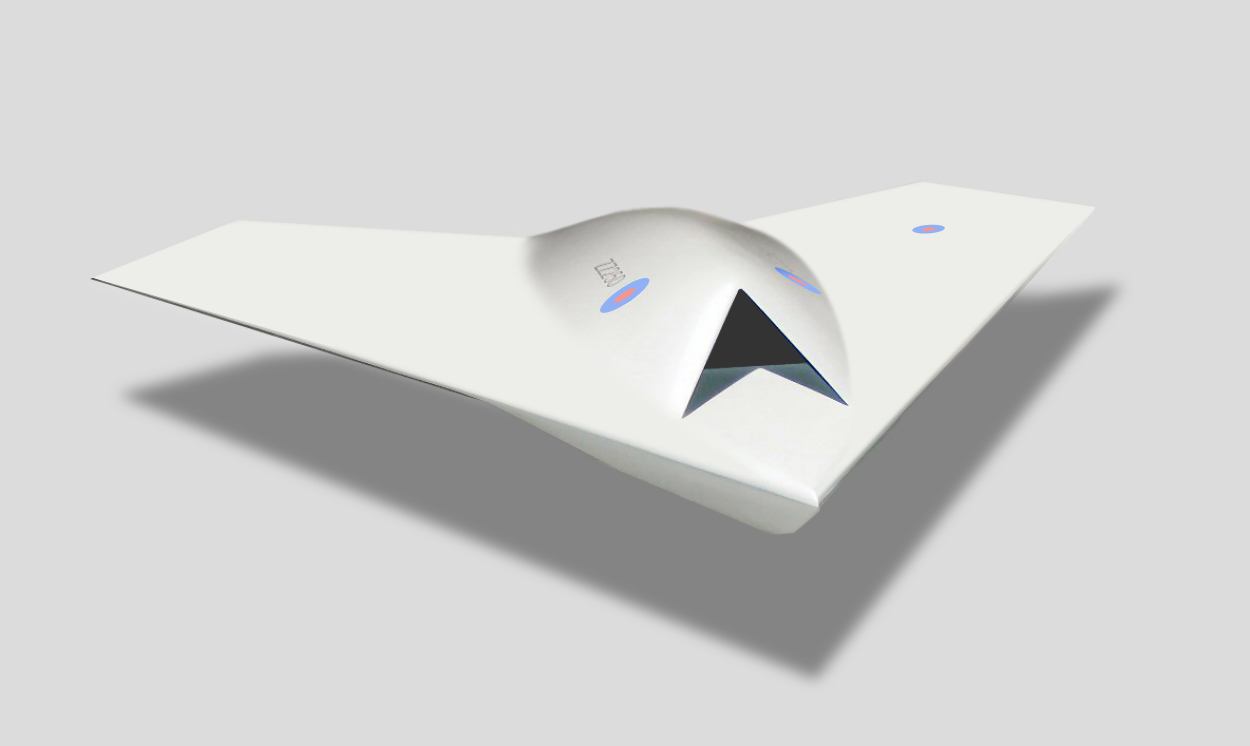
- Artist impression on the BAE Taranis

General information
- Type: Autonomous UCAV
- Manufacturer: BAE Systems Military Air & Information
- Status: In development
- Primary user: United Kingdom
- Number built: 1

History
- Manufactured: 2010-present
- First flight: 10 August 2013

The BAE Systems Taranis is an unmanned combat aerial vehicle (UCAV) technology demonstrator that was primarily developed and built by the British defence contractor BAE Systems Military Air & Information. Other contributing companies included Rolls-Royce, GE Aviation Systems, Smiths Aerospace, and QinetiQ. It is named after the Celtic god of thunder Taranis.

Taranis is designed to fly intercontinental missions autonomously while carrying a variety of weapons that would enable it to attack both aerial and ground targets. Its use of stealth technology reportedly achieves a low radar profile and is controllable via satellite link from anywhere on Earth. Similar in size to the BAE Hawk training jet, Taranis was designed to incorporate and validate stealth technology, fully autonomous operations, systems integration, and control infrastructure.

The existence of Taranis was announced in December 2006 and the assembly of the prototype commenced in February 2008. A series of taxi trials were performed at multiple locations during 2012. On 10 August 2013, the prototype performed its maiden flight. During December 2015, it was announced that the third and final set of flight tests had been completed and that it had achieved all of the established test objectives. In the mid 2010s, Taranis was reportedly planned to be operational "post 2030" and used alongside manned military aircraft. Subsequently, it was intended for the experiences and technologies gained from Taranis to be combined with the French-built Dassault nEUROn UCAV demonstrator to create a joint European UCAV, the Future Combat Air System.

== Design and development ==
=== Background and inception ===
The development of unmanned aerial vehicles (UAVs) was a key element of the UK's Defence Industrial Strategy, which was announced in December 2005, and specified the need for the UK to maintain its "sovereign" aircraft and UAV/UCAV construction skills. The Strategic Unmanned Air Vehicles (Experiment) Integrated Project Team, or SUAV(E) IPT, was given responsibility for auditing and overseeing the Taranis project.

During December 2006, the existence of the Taranis project was announced; led by BAE Systems, it also involved Rolls-Royce, GE Aviation Systems, Smiths Aerospace, QinetiQ and the Ministry of Defence (MoD). As the prime contractor, BAE Systems was responsible for the overall programme, and also for many of the component technologies, including stealth technology, systems integration and system control infrastructure. BAE Systems and QinetiQ collaborated on all aspects relating to autonomous operationss. GE Aviation Systems was responsible for providing Taranis' fuel-gauging and electrical power systems. having a 5% workshare in the project, while the Integrated Systems Technologies (Insyte) subsidiary of BAE Systems provided C4ISTAR support.

At the project's inception, BAE Systems stated that "Taranis will make use of at least 10 years of research and development into low observables, systems integration, control infrastructure and full autonomy. It follows the completion of risk-reduction activities to ensure the mix of technologies, materials and systems used are robust enough for the 'next logical step'." These "risk-reduction activities" included several earlier BAE stealth aircraft and UAV programmes, such as Replica, Nightjar I, Nightjar II, Kestrel, Corax, HERTI, and Mantis.

=== Prototype and design ===
A video of the Taranis prototype's test flight on 10 August 2013.

During September 2007, production activity began on the Taranis prototype, the assembly of which started in February 2008. On 9 January 2009, the Ministry of Defence issued a denial that Taranis had been flying near the site of a damaged wind turbine after local people claimed to have seen a UFO. Later that same year, there were reports of tensions between BAE Systems and the Ministry of Defence over the funding and progress of UCAV development.

The prototype, which had an initial development cost of £143 million, was unveiled by BAE Systems at Warton Aerodrome, Lancashire, on 12 July 2010. That same year, ground-based testing of the prototype commenced. During April 2013, low-speed taxi tests of the prototype commenced at Warton Aerodrome. Months later, it was relocated to an undisclosed test range to conduct high-speed taxi tests.

The prototype has a maximum takeoff weight (MTOW) of about 8,000 kg (18,000 lb), and is of a similar size to the BAE Hawk training jet. It has a pair of internal weapons bays, although it reportedly was not used to carry any armaments in its demonstrator role. Taranis was intended to incorporate "full autonomy", allowing it to operate without human control for a large part of its mission. Taranis' mission profile was envisioned to involve autonomously travelling to a preselected area via a programmed flight path, where upon it would automatically identify and target threats within that search area, communicate this data back to a ground control station for operators to review and, if desire, command the aircraft to engage. A 2013 report compiled by the United Nations noted that, while Taranis was capable of autonomously searching for and identifying enemies, but that it could only engage a target when authorized by a human operator via a ground control station. Taranis was able to maintain its low observability condition even while remaining in remote contact with human operators.

=== Flight testing ===
The aircraft's maiden flight was repeatedly rescheduled, at one point being set to take place during 2012, before being delayed until 2013. Prior to 2014, many of the details, including progress, related to Taranis were withheld; during 2013, officials declined to confirm whether its maiden flight had taken place. On 25 October of that same year, the Ministry of Defence revealed that not only had initial flight tests had already taken place but that the initial trials programme had reportedly already been completed.

On 5 February 2014, BAE Systems revealed information on Taranis' flight tests. The UCAV's first flight occurred on 10 August 2013 at Woomera Test Range in South Australia; this flight lasted for approximately 15 minutes. A second sortie was launched on 17 August, and subsequent flights surpassed expectations for the airframe, which reportedly flew at various speeds and heights for as long as one hour. By February 2014, Taranis' development costs had reportedly reached £185 million, compared to £140 million as had been originally projected. Around this time, Taranis was planned to be operational "post 2030" and used in concert with crewed aircraft.

In July 2014, BAE Systems stated that the second trial phase had involved propulsion integration with the aircraft's complex stealthy exhaust system, and that it has successfully flown in a low observable condition. In December 2015, it was announced that the third and final set of Taranis flight tests had been completed, during which it had reportedly achieved all of the established test objectives.

Throughout the flight test programme, although the prototype flew automatically most of the time, a separate pilot was on standby at a ground control station in case of circumstances that would require manual intervention. A total of 10 personnel were involved in its operation, five were engaged in the real-time monitoring of telemetry from the aircraft while five were tasked with the aircraft's operation. Amongst the findings of the flight test phase was that Taranis was an aerodynamically sound aircraft, demonstrating favourable speed control as well as being relatively responsive in both pitch and roll alike. This was despite the unique aerodynamic challenges posed during development.

In June 2016, BAE Systems and the MoD were reportedly holding discussions on a prospective fourth series of flight tests.

== Follow-on efforts ==
Under the terms of an Anglo-French development contract announced in 2014, experiences gathered and technologies derived from Taranis would have been combined with France's Dassault nEUROn UCAV demonstrator to produce a new joint European UCAV, the Future Combat Air System. However, by February 2019, the FCAS UCAV demonstration programme between the UK and France had seemingly been downgraded to a technology demonstration and study effort, as France deepened its collaboration with Germany.

During 2018, a mock-up of the Tempest, a proposed BAE Systems led sixth-generation fighter that is envisioned to be developed to replace the RAF's Typhoons in the mid-to-late 2030s. The UK, Italy, and Sweden signed a trilateral MoU on the Tempest initiative in December 2021.

BAE Systems revealed the Brontanax in July 2026, a new collaborative combat aircraft (CCA) loyal wingman drone designed for use by the United Kingdom.

== Specifications ==
Data from Airforce-Technology.com

General characteristics

- Length: 12.43 m (40 ft 9 in)
- Wingspan: 10 m (32 ft 10 in) (approximate)
- Height: 4 m (13 ft 1 in)
- Powerplant: 1 × Rolls-Royce Adour moderate by-pass ratio turbofan engine, 44 kN (10,000 lbf) thrust (approximate)

Armament

- 2 x internal missile bay provision

== See also ==
- Aerospace industry in the United Kingdom
- List of unmanned aerial vehicles

Similar aircraft

- AVIC 601-S
- Boeing Phantom Ray
- Dassault nEUROn
- DRDO AURA
- DRDO Ghatak
- Hongdu GJ-11
- Lockheed Martin RQ-170 Sentinel
- Northrop Grumman X-47B
- Mikoyan Skat
- Sukhoi Okhotnik
