= BAE Systems HERTI =

Unmanned aerial vehicle

HERTI
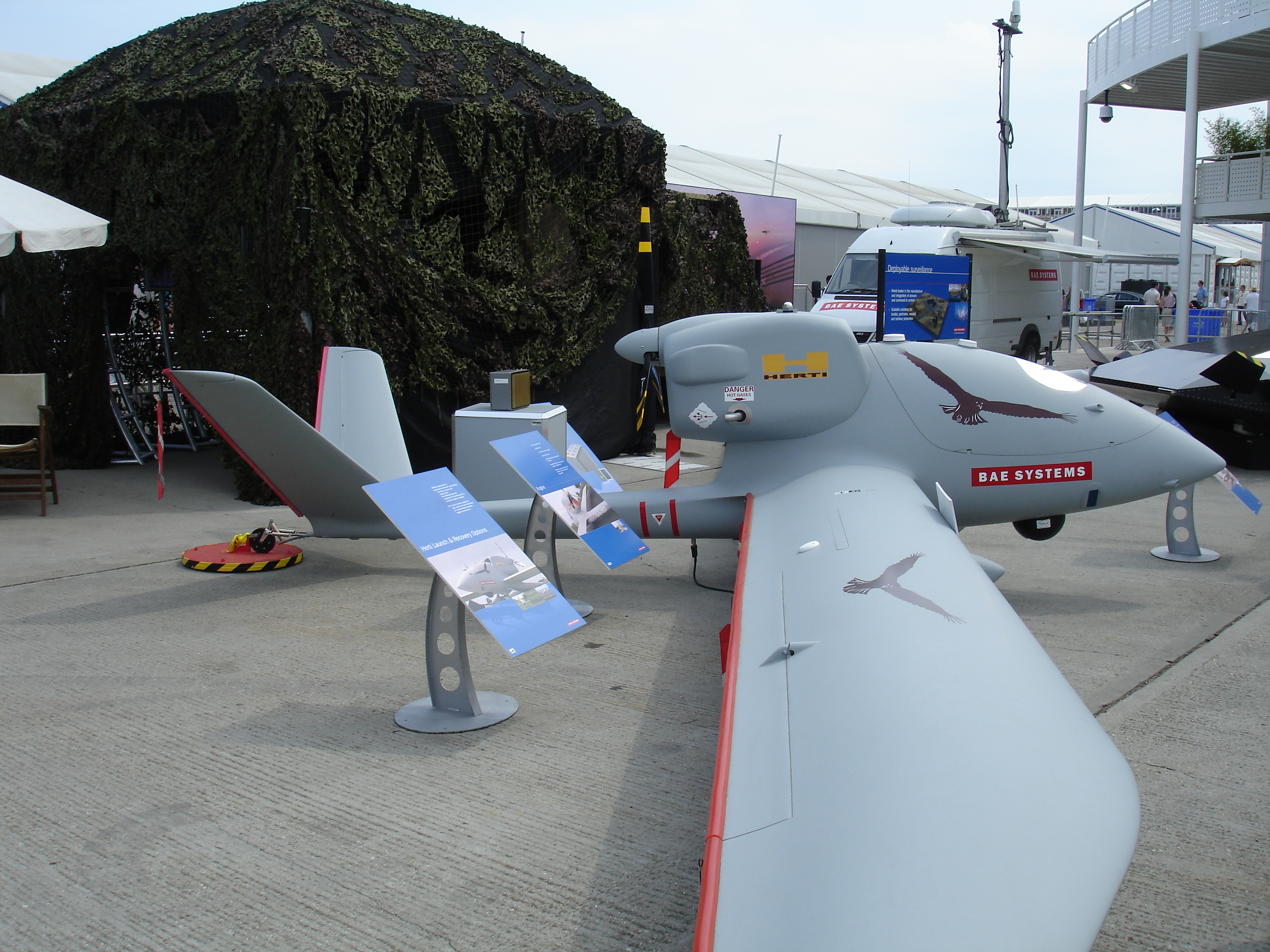
- BAE HERTI at Farnborough

General information
- Type: Reconnaissance UAV
- Manufacturer: BAE Systems
- Primary user: United Kingdom

History
- Introduction date: 2007
- First flight: 2004

The BAE Systems HERTI is an unmanned aerial vehicle (UAV) developed by the British company BAE Systems. HERTI stands for "High Endurance Rapid Technology Insertion" and was developed in Warton, United Kingdom. The HERTI airframe is based on the J-6 Fregata motor glider designed by Jaroslaw Janowski of J&AS Aero Design in Poland. Its first flight was in December 2004 at the Australian Woomera test range where much of the test flight programme has been undertaken. HERTI was also the first UAV to fly in the UK with the flight being certified by the Civil Aviation Authority (United Kingdom).

The first vehicles had a maximum takeoff weight of 450 kilograms (990 lb) and a payload of about 150 kilograms (330 lb). However the first production example will, according to Flight International, weigh about 750 kilograms (1,650 lb). The first production example will be delivered by Slingsby Aviation to BAE Systems at the end of November 2007. The endurance of the production variant is up to 20 hours.

An armed version, the BAE Fury, was announced in 2008.

== Flight test programme ==
=== Australia ===
The HERTI UAV started flight trials in Australia in late 2004. Since then, quite a few key points have been addressed, however, slightly slower than BAE Systems wanted to. The two main test centres are the Woomera range in central Australia and the West Sale airbase which is in south-east Australia. In late 2006 a HERTI vehicle flew several fully autonomous missions from the Woomera test centre to expand the flight envelope, or distance and height limits to which the UAV has flown in real tests. In mid-2007 BAE Systems started a flight campaign to increase the flight envelope even further, this time from West Sale airbase. In these trials the HERTI UAV should fly 28 km from base and at altitudes of about 1,830 metres (6,000 ft) To achieve a UAV that can safely fly within civilian airspace, BAE Systems is developing a "sense and avoid" system for HERTI, utilising a radar and electro-optical systems.

=== United Kingdom ===
The relatively few flight tests undertaken in the UK have been over the Machrihanish bay, flying from Campbeltown Airport. Due to these flights in 2005, BAE Systems claimed that it was the first UAV to fly in the UK with a CAA certification.

== Operational debut in Afghanistan ==
Under Project Morrigan, BAE Systems deployed a HERTI UAV to Afghanistan where it flew missions from Camp Bastion. Specific mission profiles are still Classified information, however the system did send data back to the UK in a procedure called "reach back" and BAE Systems claims that the deployment was a success. The Royal Air Force said that the HERTI was successful "in demonstrating its capability in an operational environment".

== Military and other uses ==
BAE Systems is showed HERTI to potential customers at various air shows, such as the Farnborough Airshow, Dubai Air Show and others. The potential for HERTI use by the British police and border control forces was mentioned. Other potential fields of application for HERTI and other UAVs are the oil and gas industry, traffic control, coastal protection, search and rescue and many more.

== Variants ==
HERTI-1D
The first prototype, jet-powered, HERTI version. It uses the same powerplant, systems and ground station as the BAE Corax. Its mass is about 350 kilograms (770 lb). The HERTI-1D was based on the J&AS Aero Design J5 Marco motor glider. BAE Systems quickly realised that a piston engine-powered HERTI had better payload and endurance than the HERTI-1D and subsequently discontinued its development.
HERTI-1A
Powered by a BMW piston engine, with a larger, modified composite airframe based on the J&AS Aero Design J6 Fregata motor glider with a higher endurance and payload than the HERTI-1D. Top speed with an ICE ("Image Collection and Exploitation") system is 125 knots.
HERTI-1B
Powered by a Rotax piston engine and controlled by multi-lane flight controls. This variant also has the more advanced autonomous ICE II mission system (payload).

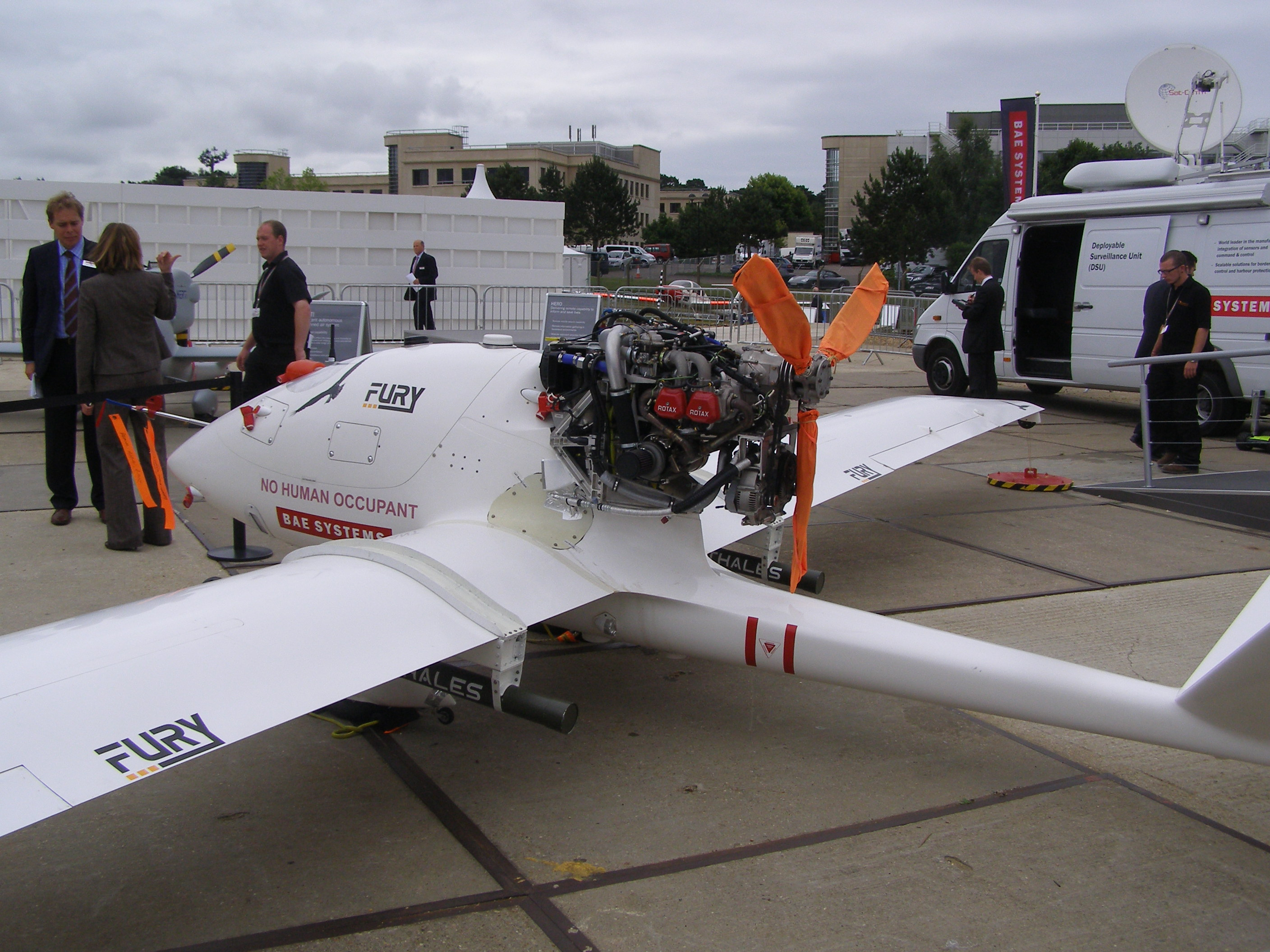
Fury at Farnborough 2008

Fury
BAE Systems announced it was investigating an armed version of HERTI in 2006. At the 2008 Farnborough International Air Show, this variant was unveiled as the Fury armed reconnaissance and close air support UAS (Unmanned Autonomous System). The Fury is an equipped with a new stores management system and armed with the Thales Lightweight Multi-role Missile (LMM).
HERTI-OC
BAE Systems are pursuing a UK civil certification licence for the HERTI-OC (Operational Capability) standard of aircraft featuring a completely new airframe and suite of Flight and Mission Systems. The program is on an incremental development program and is working closely with the UK Civil Aviation Authority. Initial plans were to see the aircraft flying from the Walney Island range in the UK, close to the home of the HERTI in Warton. However the CAA would ultimately put an end to these aspirations despite the best efforts of BAE Systems' engineers. Following this the flight trials were reportedly moved to an overseas location pending further discussions with the CAA. The aircraft itself featured a newly designed, stronger airframe allowing for operations from unprepared strips, greater payload and longer endurance and is built by Slingsby Advanced Composites in the UK. The Flight Systems, while loosely based around the previous versions of the vehicle, undertook a massive redesign to comply with Civil Certification requirements. The Mission system is also of a more advanced design, however due to the modular design of the Unmanned Aircraft System, the Mission System remains 'plug and play' that successful flight of the aircraft does not depend upon.

== Future developments ==
High altitude, long endurance version of HERTI
A proposed HALE version of HERTI should have a bigger wingspan to achieve the higher endurance and the higher altitudes needed for such a UAV.
Catapult launched version of HERTI
Tests have been carried out in 2005 in Finland to see if the HERTI could be catapult launched. The Finnish company Robonic has developed a "dummy mass" to simulate a HERTI launch. A real launch has, as of July 2006 not been carried out.

== Specifications (HERTI-OC) ==
Data from

General characteristics

- Length: 16 ft 5 in (5.00 m)
- Wingspan: 39 ft 4 in (11.99 m)
- Gross weight: 750 lb (340 kg)
- Powerplant: 1 × Rotax 914 4-cylinder air-cooled horizontally-opposed piston engine, 100 hp (75 kW)
- Propellers: 2-bladed variable-pitch propeller

Performance

- Cruise speed: 145 mph (233 km/h, 126 kn)
- Endurance: 20 hours
- Service ceiling: 20,000 ft (6,100 m)

Avionics
Information and Exploitation Systems based on 3 x Radstone Computers

== See also ==
- BAE Taranis
