= SEPECAT =

Anglo-French aircraft manufacturer

- Industry: Defence
- Founded: 1966
- Headquarters: France
- Area served: France and United Kingdom
- Products: Jaguar
- Owners: British Aircraft Corporation and Breguet/Dassault-Breguet

SEPECAT (French: Société Européenne de Production de l'avion Ecole de Combat et d'Appui Tactique) (Note: English: European Company for the Production of a Combat Trainer and Tactical Support Aircraft) was an Anglo-French aircraft manufacturer. Established in 1966, its aim was to handle the development and commercialization of the Jaguar, an attack and training aircraft. Organised as a Société Anonyme, the company was a joint venture between British Aircraft Corporation and Breguet.

== History ==
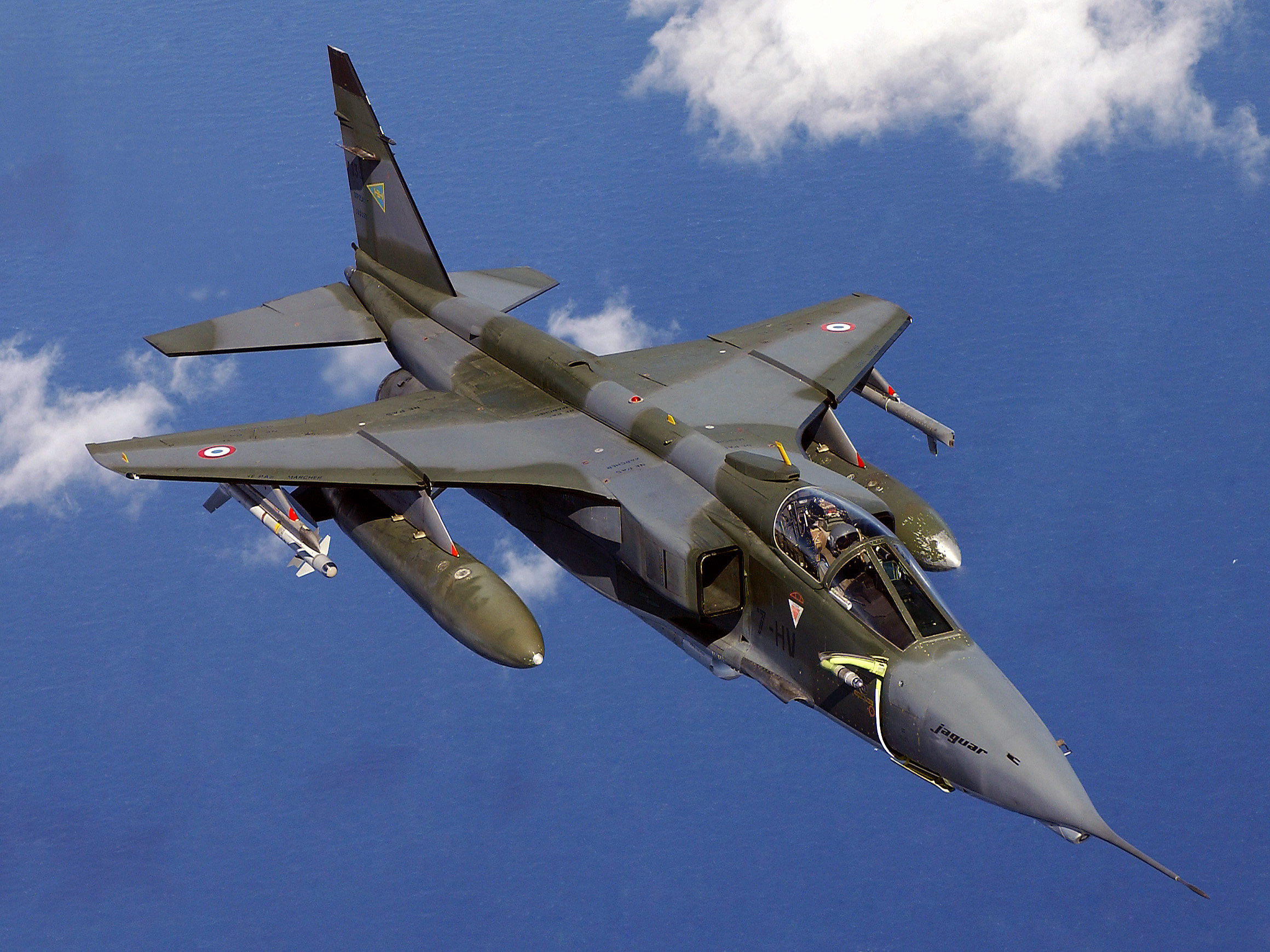
A SEPECAT Jaguar of the French Air Force over the Adriatic Sea in 2003

The Jaguar programme began in the early 1960s, in response to a British requirement (Air Staff Target 362) for an advanced supersonic jet trainer to replace the Folland Gnat T.1 and Hawker Hunter T.7, and a French requirement (ECAT or École de Combat et d'Appui Tactique, "Tactical Combat Support Trainer") for a cheap, subsonic dual-role trainer and light attack aircraft to replace the Fouga Magister, Lockheed T-33 and Dassault Mystère IV. A memorandum of understanding was signed in May 1965 between the two countries to develop two aircraft, a trainer based on the ECAT, and the larger AFVG (Anglo-French Variable Geometry). Cross-channel negotiations led to the formation of SEPECAT (Société Européenne de Production de l'Avion d'École de Combat et d'Appui Tactique—the "European company for the production of a combat trainer and tactical support aircraft") in 1966 as a joint venture between Breguet (Note: Breguet later merged to form Dassault-Breguet, subsequently Dassault Aviation) and the British Aircraft Corporation to produce the airframe.

Though based in part on the Breguet Br.121, using the same basic configuration and a new French-designed landing gear, the Jaguar was built incorporating major elements of design from BAC – notably the wing and high lift devices. Production of components was split between Breguet and BAC, and the aircraft themselves was assembled on two production lines, one in the UK and one in France, To avoid any duplication of work, each aircraft component had only one source. The British light strike/tactical support versions were the most demanding design, requiring supersonic performance, superior avionics, a cutting edge navigation/attack system of more accuracy and complexity than the French version, moving map display, laser range-finder and marked-target seeker (LRMTS). As a result, the initial Br.121 design needed a thinner wing, redesigned fuselage, a higher rear cockpit, and afterburning engines. While putting on smiling faces for the public, maintaining the illusion of a shared design, the British design departed from the French subsonic Breguet 121 to such a degree that it was effectively a new design.

A separate partnership was formed between Rolls-Royce and Turbomeca to develop the Adour afterburning turbofan engine. The Br.121 was proposed with Turbomeca's Tourmalet engine for ECAT but Breguet preferred the RR RB.172 and their joint venture would use elements of both. The new engine, which would be used for the AFVG as well, would be built in Derby and Tarnos.

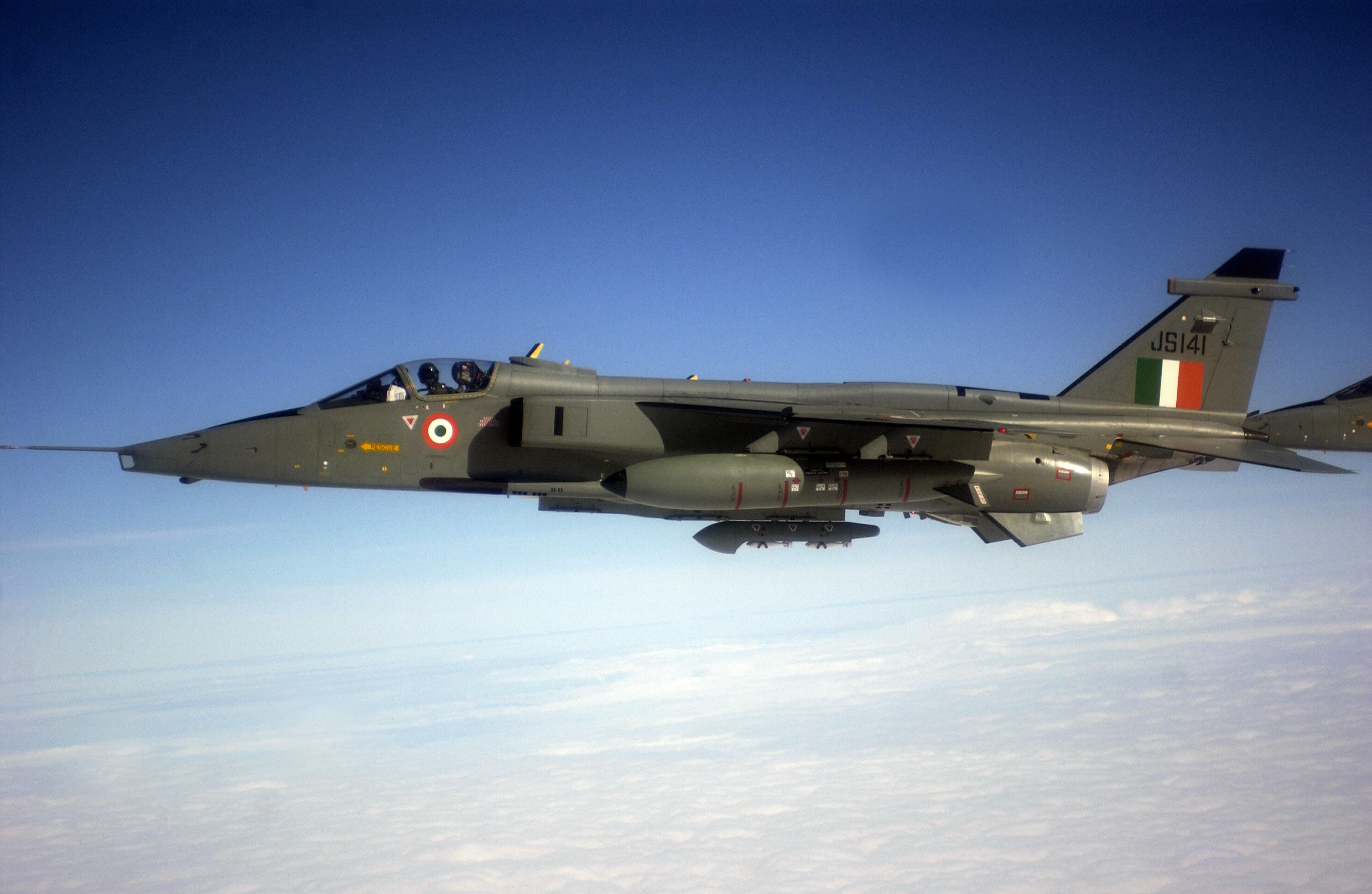
A Jaguar of the Indian Air Force, license built by Hindustan Aeronautics Limited

While the previous collaborative efforts between Britain and France had been complicated – the AFVG programme ended in cancellation, and controversy surrounded the development of the supersonic airliner Concorde, the technical collaboration between BAC and Breguet initially went well. However, when Dassault took over Breguet in 1971 it encouraged acceptance of its own designs, such as the Super Étendard naval attack aircraft and the Mirage F1, for which it would receive more profit, over the British-French Jaguar. Specifically, Dassault claimed that the Super Étendard was simpler and cheaper than the Jaguar, successfully persuading the French Navy to order it instead of the marinised Jaguar M, leading to the variant's cancellation in 1973.

In addition to the type's adoption by France and the United Kingdom, the Jaguar was successfully exported abroad as well. As early as 1968, India had been approached as a possible customer for the Jaguar, but had declined, partly on the grounds that it was not yet clear if the French and British would themselves accept the aircraft into service. India already had its indigenous HF-24 Marut fighter-bomber, and tried to upgrade it, until the project collapsed. In 1978, the Indian Air Force (IAF) became the largest export customer, with a $1 billion order for the Jaguar aircraft, which was chosen ahead of the Dassault Mirage F1 and the Saab Viggen after a long evaluation process. The order included 40 aircraft to be built at Warton, and 120 aircraft to be licence-built at Hindustan Aeronautics Limited (HAL). It was named as Shamsher ("Sword of Justice").

== See also ==
- Panavia Aircraft GmbH
