= EL/M-2052 =

Type of radar system

- Country of origin: Israel
- Type: Solid-state active electronically scanned array (AESA) fire control radar
- Frequency: X-Band
- Range: 200 km (120 mi)
- Azimuth: 200°
- Power: ≈10 kw peak

The Elta 2052 or EL/M-2052 is an X-Band airborne Active Electronically Scanned Array (AESA) fire control radar (FCR) designed for fighter aircraft to support air-to-air combat and strike missions. Currently, it is fitted in the SEPECAT Jaguar as part of the Indian Air Force (IAF) DARIN III upgrade program. The radar is also fitted in HAL Tejas, and could also be used on other fighter aircraft such as F-15, MiG-29, Mirage 2000, and FA-50 Block 20.

The FCR is based on fully solid-state active phased array technology. The radar has multi-target tracking capabilities, able to track up to 64 targets simultaneously. The EL/M-2052 radar incorporates operational feedback from Israeli Air Force combat pilots. In the air-to-air mode, the radar enables long-range multi-target detection and enables simultaneous weapon deliveries in combat engagements.

The Synthetic Aperture Radar (SAR) capabilities of the radar include high-resolution mapping, ground/surface moving target detection, and tracking using Real Beam Mapping (RBM), Doppler Beam Sharpening (DBS), in addition to Air to Ground Ranging (AGR). The radar system also provides long-range target detection and tracking, including target classification capabilities (RS, ISAR).

== Specifications ==
The Elta ELM-2052 is a X band airborne fire control radar. The radar is based on solid-state active phased array (AESA)technology. The ELM-2052 is an upgraded version of the ELM-2032. Its antenna can be fitted with either 300 to 1500 active Ga-As TR-Modules.It has a reported range of 200 km in air-to-air mode.

== Controversy ==
A Chinese company based in Beijing called NAV Technologies has marketed a radar similar to the Elta 2052. It is said to have caused an investigation in Washington for a connection between Israel and Beijing, but Elta has denied it.
