= SEPECAT Jaguar =

French/British attack aircraft

Jaguar
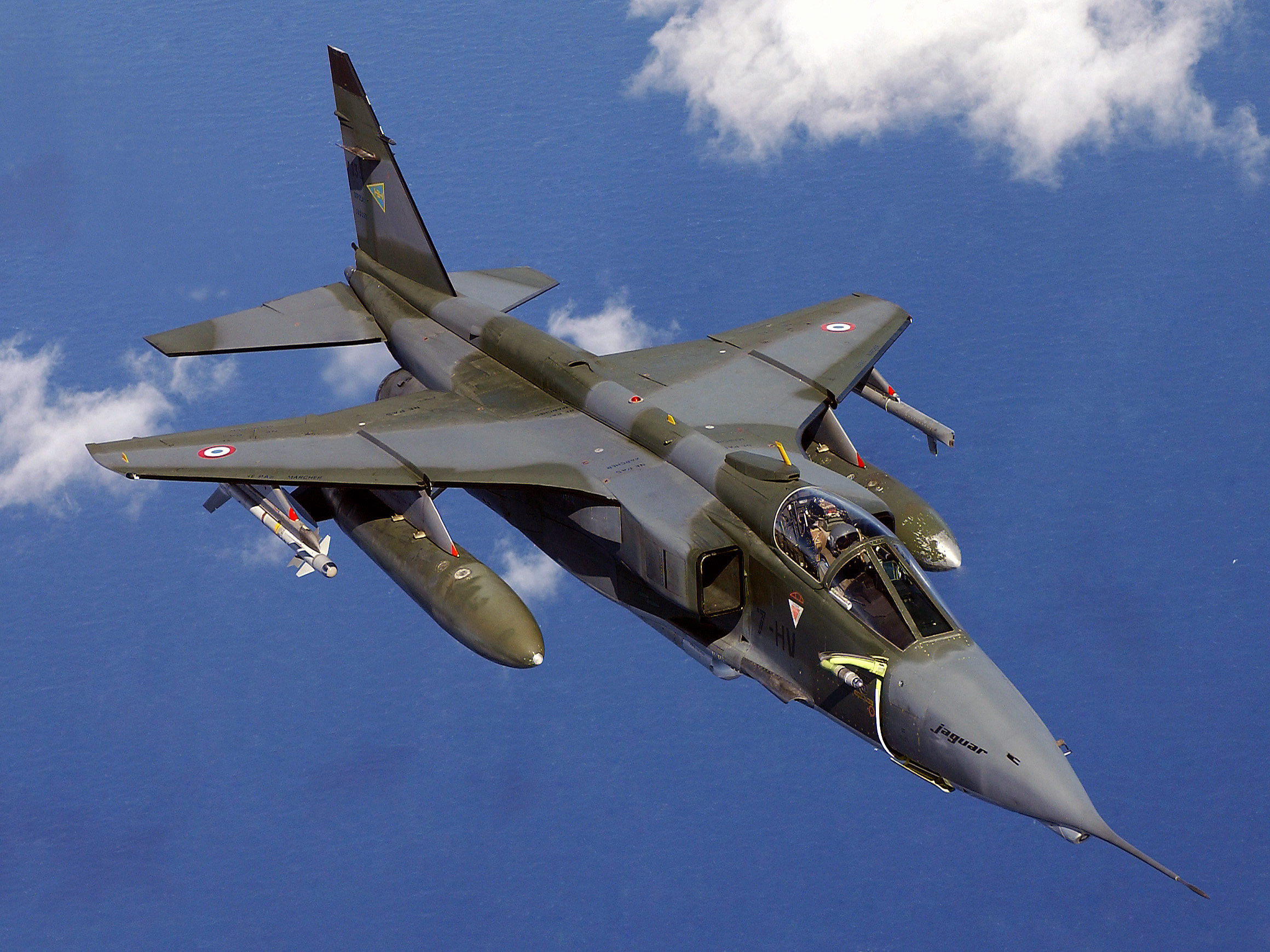
- A French Air Force Jaguar flying over the Adriatic Sea

General information
- Type: Attack aircraft
- National origin: France / United Kingdom
- Manufacturer: SEPECAT (Breguet/BAC)
- Built by: SEPECAT / HAL
- Status: In service
- Primary users: Indian Air Force: Royal Air Force (historical); French Air Force (historical); Royal Air Force of Oman (historical)
- Number built: 573

History
- Manufactured: 1968–1981
- Introduction date: 1973
- First flight: 8 September 1968
- Retired: 2005 (France) / 2007 (UK) / 2014 (Oman)

The SEPECAT Jaguar is a British-French supersonic jet attack aircraft originally used by the British Royal Air Force and the French Air Force in the close air support and nuclear strike role. As of 2026, the Jaguar remains in service with only the Indian Air Force.

Originally conceived in the 1960s as a jet trainer with a light ground attack capability, the requirement for the aircraft changed to include supersonic performance, reconnaissance and tactical nuclear strike roles. The aircraft were manufactured by SEPECAT (Société Européenne de Production de l'avion Ecole de Combat et d'Appui Tactique), a joint venture between Breguet and the British Aircraft Corporation, one of the first major joint British-French military aircraft programmes. It was also later license produced by Hindustan Aeronautics Limited in India for use of the Indian Air Force. Various single and two–seater variants of the aircraft have been developed over the years, including a maritime strike version. A carrier-based variant was also planned for French Navy service, but this was cancelled in favour of the cheaper, fully French-built Dassault-Breguet Super Étendard.

The Jaguar was exported to India, Oman, Ecuador and Nigeria, and was used in conflicts and military operations in Bosnia, Chad, Iraq, Mauritania, and Pakistan. It provided a ready nuclear delivery platform for the United Kingdom, France, and India throughout the latter years of the Cold War and beyond. In the Gulf War, the Jaguar was praised for its reliability and was a valuable resource for the Coalition. The aircraft served as a strike/attack aircraft with the French Air Force until 1 July 2005, and with the Royal Air Force until the end of April 2007, although non-flying examples still serve with the latter for training of maintenance crews.

== Development ==
=== Background ===
The Jaguar programme began in the early 1960s, in response to a British requirement (Air Staff Target 362) for an advanced supersonic jet trainer to replace the Folland Gnat T1 and Hawker Hunter T7, and a French requirement (ECAT–École de Combat et d'Appui Tactique, "tactical combat support trainer") for a cheap, subsonic dual role trainer and light attack aircraft to replace the Fouga Magister, Lockheed T-33 and Dassault Mystère IV. In both countries several companies tendered designs: British Aircraft Corporation (BAC), Folland, Hawker Siddeley, and Hunting, in Britain; Breguet, Dassault, Nord, Potez, and Sud from France. In May 1965, a Memorandum of understanding was signed by the two countries to develop two aircraft, a trainer based on the ECAT, and the larger AFVG (Anglo-French Variable Geometry). Cross-channel negotiations led to the formation of SEPECAT (Société Européenne de Production de l'Avion d'École de Combat et d'Appui Tactique; "European company for the production of a combat trainer and tactical support aircraft") in 1966 as a joint venture between BAC and Breguet (Note: Breguet later merged to form Dassault-Breguet, subsequently Dassault Aviation) to produce the airframe.) Though based in part on the French-designed Breguet Br.121, using the same basic configuration and the landing gear setup, the Jaguar was built incorporating major elements of design from BAC, notably the wing and high lift devices.

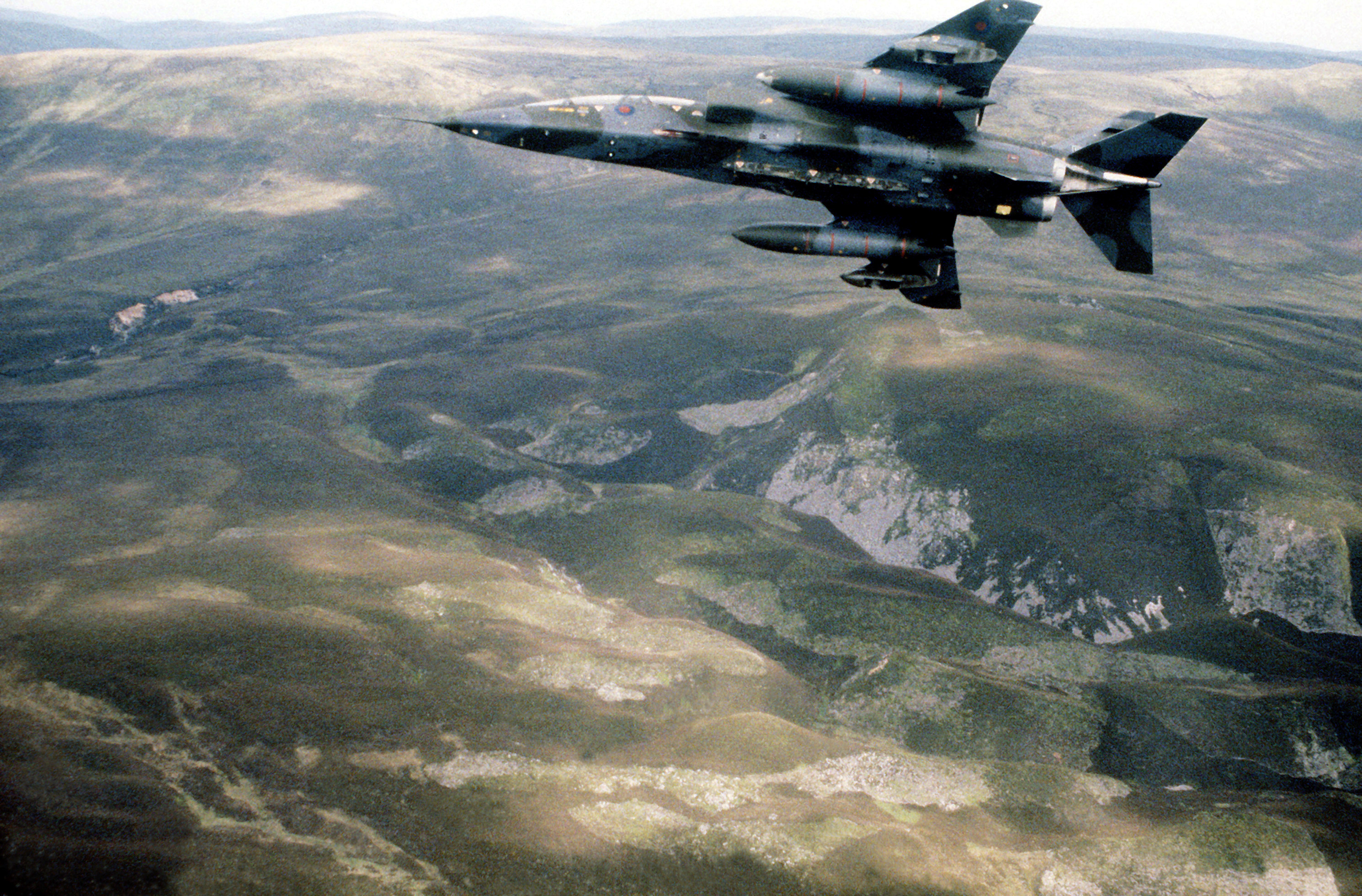
RAF Jaguar in flight displaying the fuel tanks and the CBLS (carrier, bomb, light store) fitted to its under-wing pylons.

The production of the components would be split between BAC and Breguet, and the aircraft themselves would be assembled on two production lines; one in the United Kingdom and other in France. To avoid any duplication of work, each aircraft component had only one source. The British light strike/tactical support versions were the most demanding design, requiring supersonic performance, superior avionics and more accurate navigation/attack systems including moving map display, laser range-finder and marked-target seeker (LRMTS). As a result, the initial Br.121 design needed a thinner wing, redesigned fuselage, a higher rear cockpit, and after-burning engines. The British design departed from the French sub-sonic Breguet 121 to such a degree that it was effectively a new design. A separate partnership was formed between Rolls-Royce and Turbomeca to develop the Adour afterburning turbofan engine. The Br.121 was proposed with Turbomeca's Tourmalet engine for ECAT but Breguet preferred the Rolls-Royce RB.172 and their joint venture would use elements of both. The new engine, which would be used for the AFVG as well, would be built in Derby in the UK and Tarnos in France.

The initial plan was for Britain to buy 150 Jaguar "B" trainers, with its strike requirements to be met by the advanced AFVG aircraft. France planned to order 75 "E" trainers (école) and 75 "A" single-seat strike attack aircraft (appui). With the cancellation of the plans for BAC TSR-2 tactical strike aircraft and Hawker Siddeley P.1154 supersonic V/STOL fighter, the British Royal Air Force (RAF) were looking at their future light strike needs and needed more than just advanced trainers with some secondary counter insurgency capability. At this point, the RAF's proposed strike fleet was to be the American General Dynamics F-111s plus the AFVG for lighter strike purposes. There was concern that both F-111 and AFVG were high risk projects and with the French already planning on a strike role for the Jaguar, there was an opportunity to introduce a credible backup plan for the RAF's future strike needs – the Jaguar. Dassault favoured its own Mirage G aircraft above the collaborative AFVG, and in June 1967, France cancelled the AFVG on cost grounds. This left a gap in the RAF's planned strike capabilities in the 1970s. At the same time as France's cancellation of the AFVG, Germany expressed a serious interest in the Jaguar, and thus the design became more oriented towards the low-level strike role. By October 1970, the RAF's requirements had changed to 165 single-seat strike aircraft and 35 trainers.

The Jaguar was to replace the McDonnell Douglas Phantom FGR2 in the close air support, tactical reconnaissance and tactical strike roles, freeing the Phantom to be used for air defence. Both the French and British trainer requirements had developed significantly, and were eventually fulfilled instead by the Alpha Jet and Hawker Siddeley Hawk respectively. The French, meanwhile, had chosen the Jaguar to replace the Aeronavale's Dassault Étendard IV, and increased their order to include an initial 40 of a carrier-capable maritime version of the Jaguar, the Jaguar M. From these apparently disparate aims would come a single and entirely different aircraft compared to the one that was envisaged earlier, with relatively high-tech, supersonic speeds, and optimised for ground-attack in a high-threat environment. While the previous collaborative efforts between Britain and France had been complicated – the AFVG programme ended in cancellation, and controversy surrounded the development of the supersonic airliner Concorde, the technical collaboration between BAC and Breguet initially went well. However, when Dassault took over Breguet in 1971 it encouraged acceptance of its own designs, such as the Super Étendard naval attack aircraft and the Mirage F1, for which it would receive more profit, over the British-French Jaguar.

=== Prototypes ===
The first of eight prototypes flew on 8 September 1968, a two-seat design fitted with the first production model Adour engine. This aircraft went supersonic on its third flight but was lost on landing on 26 March 1970 following an engine fire. The second prototype flew in February 1969 and a total of three prototypes flew at the Paris Air Show later that year. The first French "A" prototype flew in March 1969, and a British "S" conducted its first flight in October.

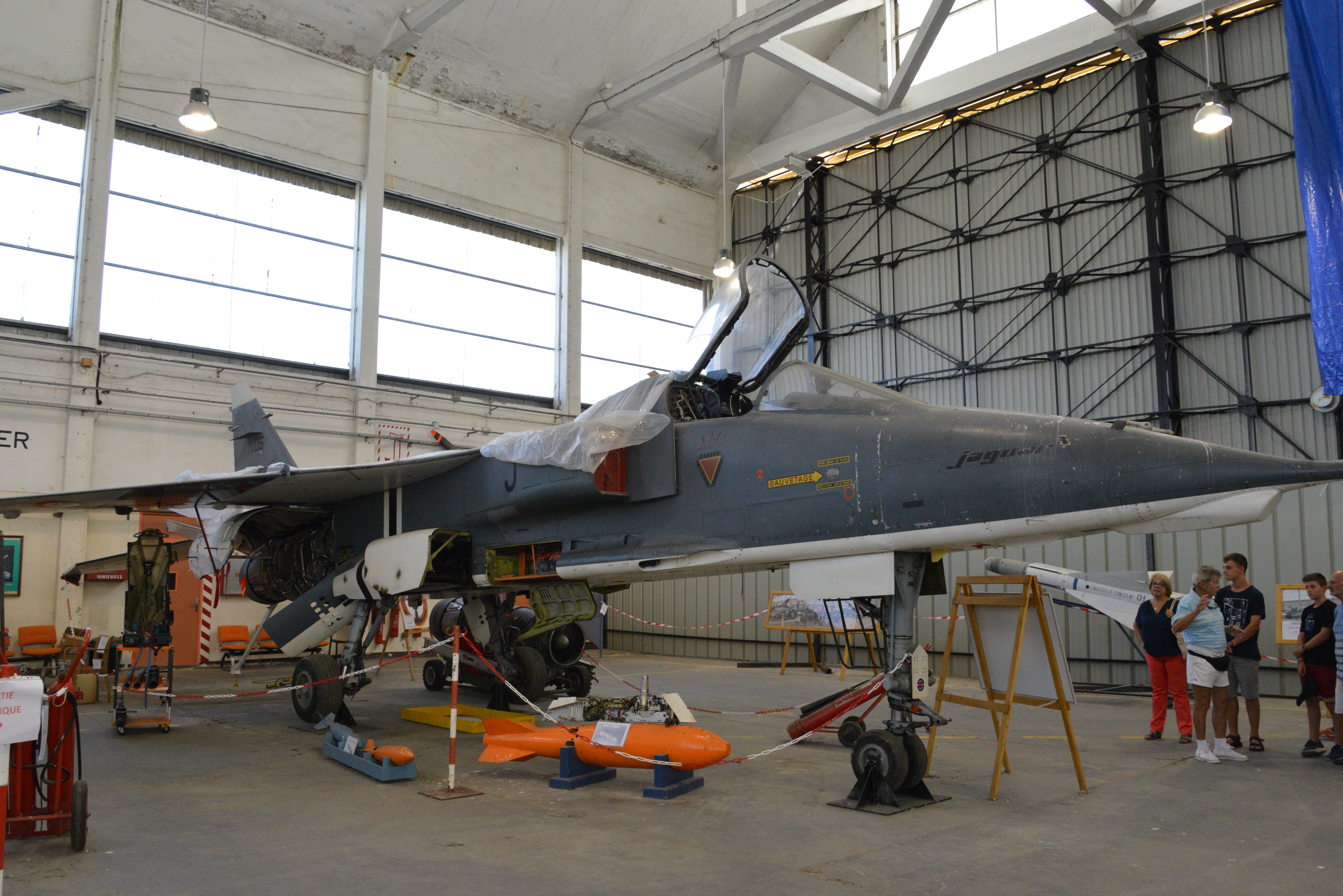
Jaguar M prototype

A Jaguar M prototype flew in November 1969. This had a strengthened airframe, an arrestor hook and different undercarriage: twin nosewheel and single mainwheel carriage. After testing in France, it went to RAE at Thurleigh for landing trials from their land based catapult, after which, in July 1970, it underwent a series of shipboard trials on board the French aircraft carrier Clemenceau. Concerns regarding the throttle response of the aircraft in case of an aborted landing came up during the trials. The shipboard testing also revealed problems with the aircraft's handling when flying on one engine, although planned engine improvements were to have rectified these problems. The "M" was considered a suitable replacement for the Étendard IV with the Aeronavale planning for only 60 aircraft instead of the 100 originally planned. In 1971, Dassault proposed the Super Étendard, claiming that it was a simpler and cheaper development of the existing Étendard IV, and in 1973, the French Navy ordered it instead of the Jaguar. However, rising costs meant that only 71 of the planned 100 Super Étendards were purchased. The M was cancelled by the French government in 1973.

== Design ==
The Jaguar has a swept-wing, twin-engine monoplane design, with a tall tricycle-type retractable landing gear. In its original configuration, it had a maximum take-off weight in the 15 tonne class. With a combat radius of 850 km (530 mi), the Jaguar had a greater operational range than comparable aircraft of the era such as the Mikoyan MiG-27.

=== Engine ===
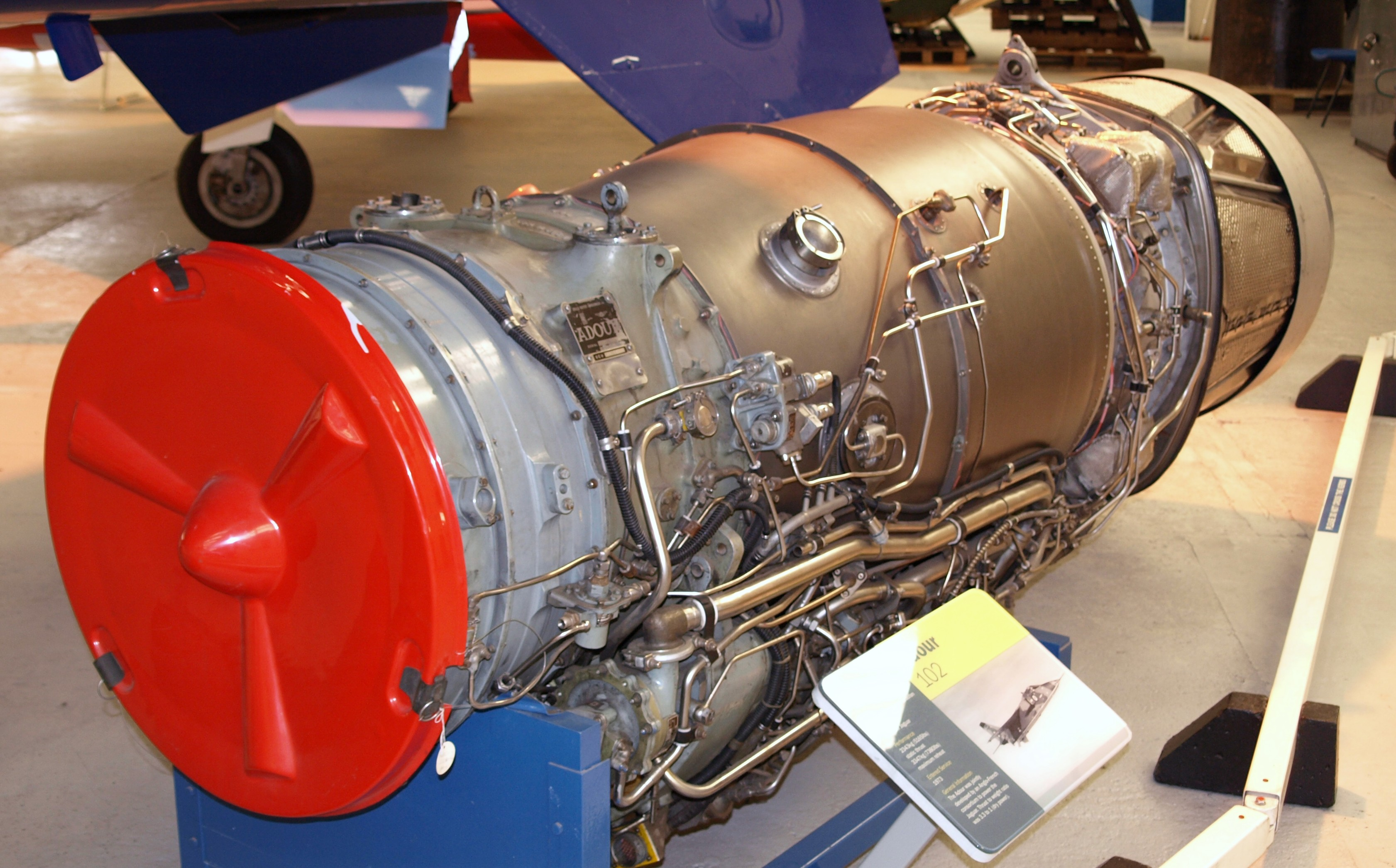
Adour Mk 102 turbofan engine developed by Rolls-Royce Turbomeca for the Jaguar

The Jaguar is powered by the Rolls-Royce Turbomeca Adour two-shaft turbofan engine, which was developed in parallel with, and primarily for the Jaguar. The aircraft needed a low bypass engine capable of high thrust for take off, supersonic flight and low level flight. Each aircraft had twin engines, a design for survivability. While the ease of maintenance was a major consideration, an engine change was possible within 30 minutes.

When the first prototype Jaguar flew on 8 September 1968, it was also the first flight for the engine. In its initial stages of development, the Adour engine had complications with the stability of the afterburner system, and shipboard testing showed slow throttle response times, problematic in the situation of an aborted landing. Further engine improvements rectified these problems prior to the induction of Jaguar into service. In French service, the Jaguars were introduced using the original Mk.101 engine. RAF Jaguars entered service using the Mk.102 engine, featuring a better afterburner-throttle control over the Mk.101. The RAF later had its Jaguars re-engined around 1981 with the improved Adour Mk.104, and again in 1999 with the Mk.106, each providing greater performance.

A non-afterburning model of the Adour was later developed, which was used in the Hawk, which had beaten the Jaguar to fulfill the Air Staff Target 362 trainer requirement. Adour engines were also used in McDonnell Douglas T-45 Goshawk, Mitsubishi T-2, and derived Mitsubishi F-1 aircraft.

=== Avionics ===
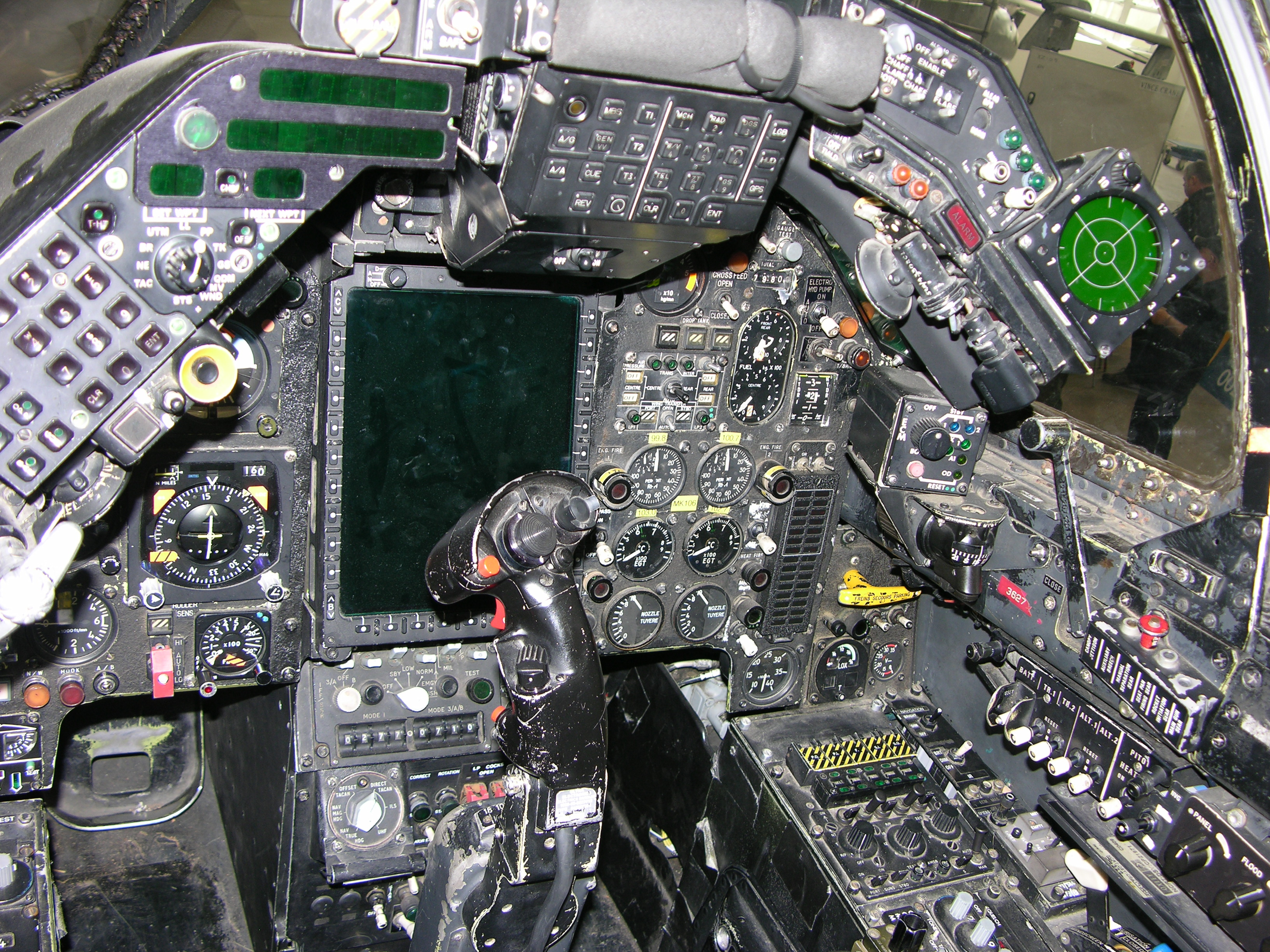
Cockpit of an RAF Jaguar GR3A

The Jaguar was equipped with a navigation and attack system. While initial versions had a double gyroscopic system and a Doppler radar derived from the Mirage IIIE, the GR1s had a new digital system with an inertial navigation system and a heads-up display, and a Laser Ranging and Marked Targeting System (LRMTS). Although in operational theatres such as the Gulf War, the Jaguar proved to be mechanically more reliable, the aircraft's avionics were outdated and was a hindrance to conducting missions. Owing to the Jaguar A's shortcomings in navigation and target acquisition, French Jaguars had to be escorted by Mirage F1CR reconnaissance aircraft to act as guides. Hence, significant changes were made both during and shortly after the war. Both French and British Jaguars had recently-developed Global Positioning System (GPS) receivers fitted, more accurate than their previous navigational systems. Prior to Operation Deliberate Force, the 1995 NATO bombing campaign in Bosnia and Herzegovina, a dozen RAF Jaguars were upgraded with the capability to carry the TIALD laser designator pod.

Shortly afterwards, the RAF upgraded its Jaguar fleet to a common standard, incorporating TIALD and the ability to use new reconnaissance pods. The interim GR3 upgrade added a new Head-up display, a new hand controller and stick top, integrated GPS and TERPROM Terrain Referenced Navigation. The further upgraded GR3A variant introduced the new EO GP1 digital reconnaissance pod, a helmet-mounted display, improved cockpit displays, a datalink, and improved night vision goggles compatibility. Some aircraft of the Indian Air Force (IAF) had the Agave radar system, purposely for maritime strike. India later developed the DARIN (Display Attack and Ranging Inertial Navigation) avionics suite for its Jaguar fleet, with a multi mode radar and a modern databus. A single Jaguar was converted into the Jaguar Active Control Technology with fly-by-wire controls and aerodynamic alterations to the airframe, allowing aerodynamic instability which improved manoeuvrability, the data from which was used later in the development of the Eurofighter.

=== Armament ===
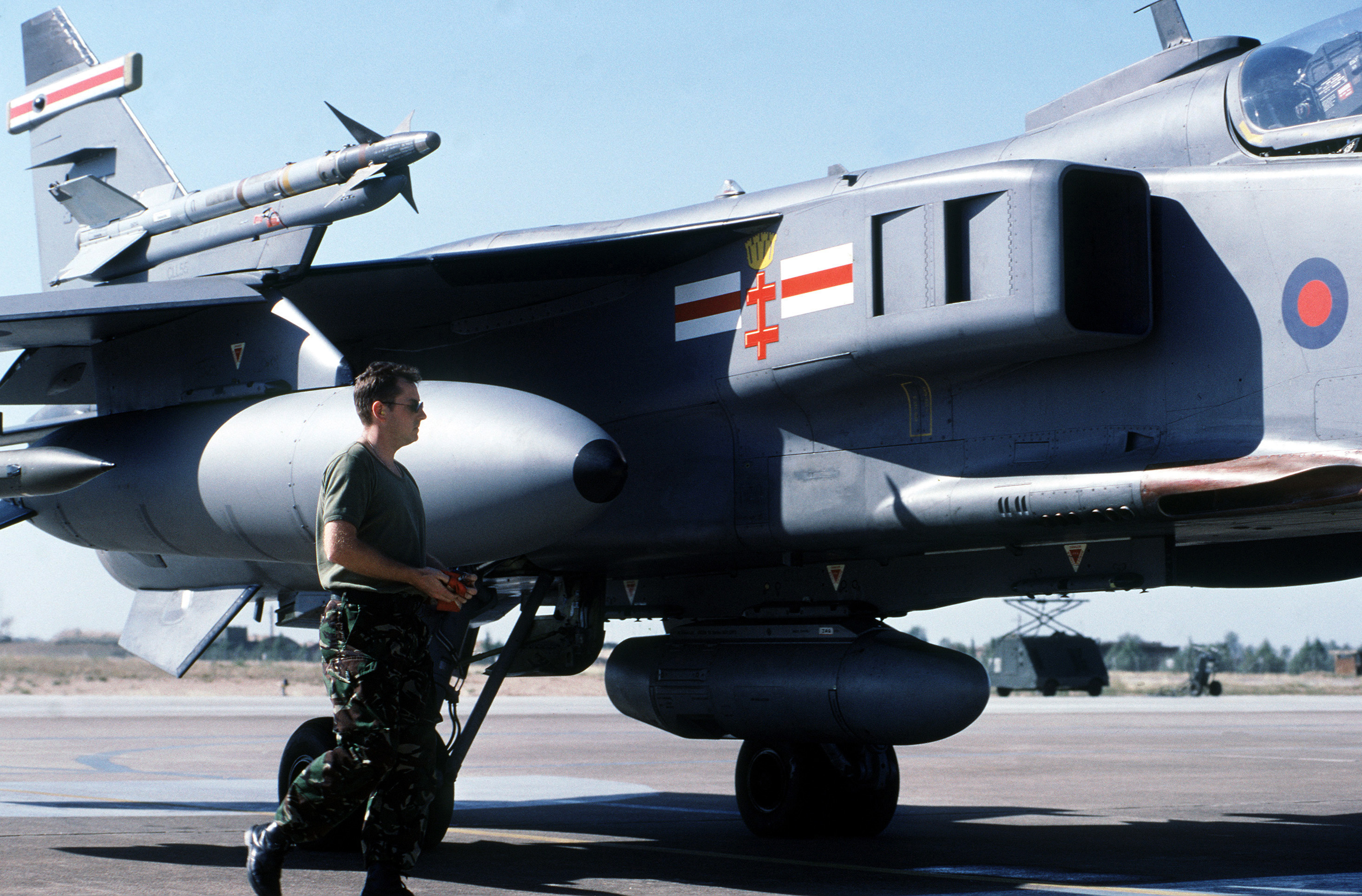
Royal Air Force Jaguar GR3 armed with a AIM-9 Sidewinder missile

The aircraft had hardpoints for carrying an external weapons load of up to 10,000 lb (4,500 kg). Typical weapons fitted included the Matra LR.F2 rocket pod, BAP 100 bombs, Martel AS.37 anti-radar missiles, AIM-9 Sidewinder missiles, and Rockeye cluster bombs. During the Gulf War, the RAF's Jaguars were fitted with several new weapons including CRV7 high-velocity rockets and American CBU-87 cluster bombs. It was also equipped with either a pair of 30 mm autocannon - the French DEFA cannon, or British ADEN cannon. Missiles like AS-30 and the anti-ship Sea Eagle (later replaced by AGM-84 Harpoon) were added to maritime strike versions of the aircraft.

The Jaguar had the unusual option of overwing pylons, used for short-range air-to-air missiles, such as the Matra R550 Magic or the Sidewinder. This option freed up hardpoints in the under-wing pylons for other weapons and stores. While RAF Jaguars gained overwing pylons in the buildup to Operation Granby in 1990, the French Jaguars were not modified.

== Operational history ==
=== France ===
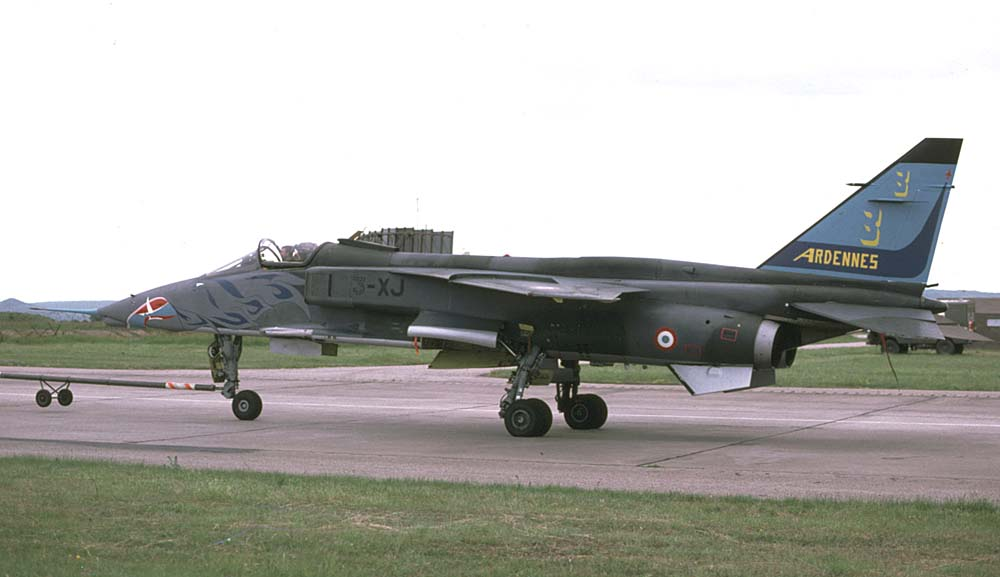
A French Jaguar under tow

The French Air Force took delivery of the Jaguar in 1973, the first of the 160 single-seat Jaguar As variant. For type conversion training, it also took 40 two-seat Jaguar E aircraft. While the Jaguar was capable of carrying a single AN-52 nuclear bomb, the French government did not assign any Jaguars for use in the Force de frappe, France's strategic nuclear deterrent. Nuclear armed Jaguars were instead assigned the "pre-Strategic" role, to clear a path for the strategic strike force. The AN-52 nuclear bomb was retired from service in September 1991, and the formerly nuclear-armed squadrons of Escadre de Chasse 7 then concentrated on conventional attack. French Jaguars also performed in the role of electronic counter measures (ECM) aircraft, bearing the Martel anti-radiation missile, capable of staying airborne for long periods with mid air refueling.

==== African deployments ====
During the 1970s, the Jaguar was deployed in defence of French interests in Africa, a policy sometimes referred to as "Jaguar diplomacy" (la diplomatie du Jaguar). Jaguars made their combat debut against Polisario Front forces in Mauritania in December 1977, as part of Opération Lamantin. In August 1978, a conventionally armed rapid reaction squadron was established, intended to deploy in support of French forces and interests anywhere in the world. France was involved in the Chadian–Libyan conflict, and 2,000 French men of the Force d'Intervention were deployed along with Jaguar aircraft and helicopters to defend central Chad in 1978, with further forces arriving later as part of Opération Tacaud. During May and June 1978, the Jaguars contributed significantly in halting an offensive by Goukouni Oueddei's FROLINAT forces. One aircraft was shot down, with the pilot being recovered later.

In support of the further military action in the region, known as Operation Manta, Jaguars were deployed to Bangui, Central African Republic, in 1983, before being re-based inside at N'Djamena International Airport in Chad. On 25 January 1984, the French Jaguars attacked a rebel column that was withdrawing after raiding the town of Zigey, and one aircraft was shot down and the pilot, Captain Michel Croci, was killed. The French forces were withdrawn in 1984, as part of a de-escalation agreement, whereby both Libyan and French forces were to be withdrawn from Chad. As the Libyans went back on the agreement, the Jaguars were re-deployed to Chad in 1986, as part of Operation Epervier, for a more offensive role. On 16 February 1986, 11 Jaguars, escorted by Mirage F1 fighters and supported by Boeing C-135F tankers and Breguet Atlantic aircraft, launched a raid on the Wadi Doum airfield, which the Libyans had constructed in Northern Chad, using BAP-100 cluster bombs. In response to Libyan incursions, another strike was carried out on 7 January 1987, when a Jaguar destroyed a Libyan radar with a Martel missile. The Jaguars stationed at N'djamena were a target for Libyan sabotage owing to their effectiveness against the Libyan forces, however the attempts were unsuccessful.

==== Gulf War ====
France committed military assets including the Jaguars to the coalition during the Gulf War. In October 1990, eight Jaguar A aircraft and several Mirage F1CR reconnaissance aircraft were sent to the Middle East. The Mirages, which had more advanced avionics, acted as guides for the Jaguars. Because their obsolete navigational systems were unable to provide the accuracy required, both French and British Jaguars were modified with GPS receivers. The French Jaguar force in Saudi Arabia grew to a maximum of 28 aircraft and carried out 615 combat sorties, during which one Jaguar was damaged by an Iraqi surface-to-air missile. Typical targets were Iraqi armoured units, Scud missile sites, and naval vessels. On 17 January 1991, 12 French Jaguars bombed Ahmad al-Jaber Air Base in Kuwait. While three aircraft were damaged in the attack, all returned to the base. The Iraqi Republican Guard, entrenched on the Kuwait-Saudi border, were subjected to a continuous intensive bombing campaign for weeks to demoralise them, allied Jaguars forming a portion of the delivering aircraft. The Jaguars also performed valuable reconnaissance of the combat area for Coalition forces. The Jaguars were withdrawn from the region in March 1991, at the end of the Operation Desert Storm.

==== Subsequent operations ====
During the Operation Deliberate Force in 1995, six Jaguars based in Italy conducted 63 strike missions in Bosnia. The last Jaguars in French service were retired in 2005, being replaced in the ground attack roles by the Dassault Rafale.

=== United Kingdom ===
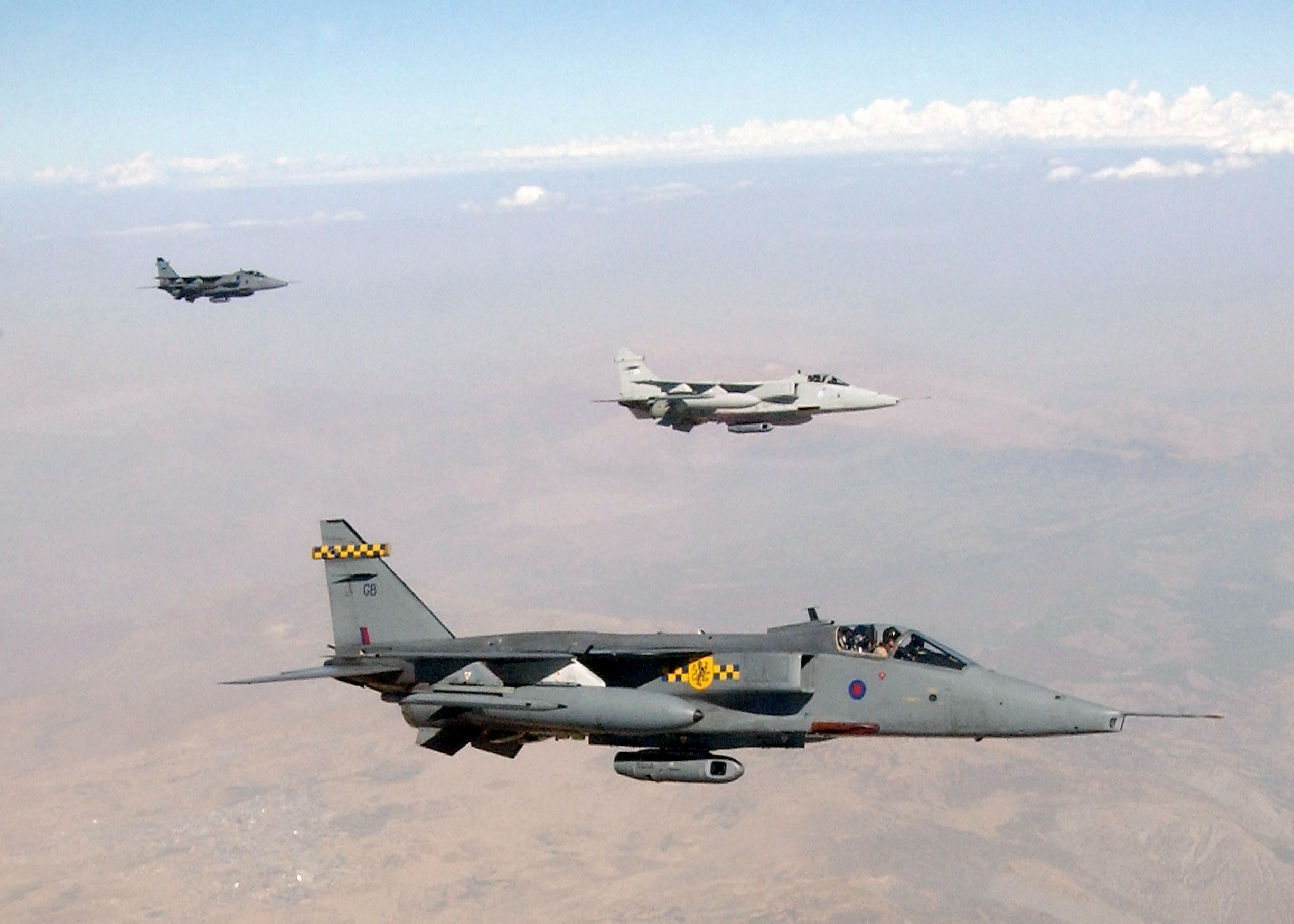
Three RAF Jaguars during Operation Northern Watch in September 2002.

The RAF accepted delivery of the first of 165 single seat Jaguar GR1s (the British service designation of the Jaguar S) with No 54 (F) squadron in 1974. These were supplemented by 35 two seat trainers, the Jaguar T2 (previously Jaguar B). The Jaguar S and B had a more comprehensive navigation/attack system than the A and E models used by the French Air Force, consisting of a Ferranti/Marconi Navigation and Weapon Aiming Sub System (NAVWASS) and a Plessey 10 Way Weapon Control System. The RAF Jaguars were used for rapid deployment and regional reinforcement, and in the tactical nuclear strike role, carrying WE.177 bombs.

Beginning in 1975 with 6 Squadron, followed by 54 Squadron based at RAF Coltishall, and a Shadow squadron, 226 Operational Conversion Unit (OCU) based at RAF Lossiemouth, the Jaguar squadrons armed with the WE.177, were declared operational to SACEUR of the NATO. The 14 Squadron and 17 Squadron based at RAF Bruggen followed in 1977. The 20 Squadron and 31 Squadron also based at RAF Bruggen brought the RAF Jaguar force to its peak strength of six squadrons and the OCU with twelve aircraft and eight WE.177s. Two further squadrons, 2 Squadron and 41 Squadron based at RAF Laarbruch and RAF Coltishall respectively, were primarily tasked with tactical reconnaissance. From 1975, the OCU's wartime role was as an operational squadron in the front line assigned to SACEUR with 12 Jaguar aircraft, eight WE.177 nuclear bombs, and a variety of conventional weapons.

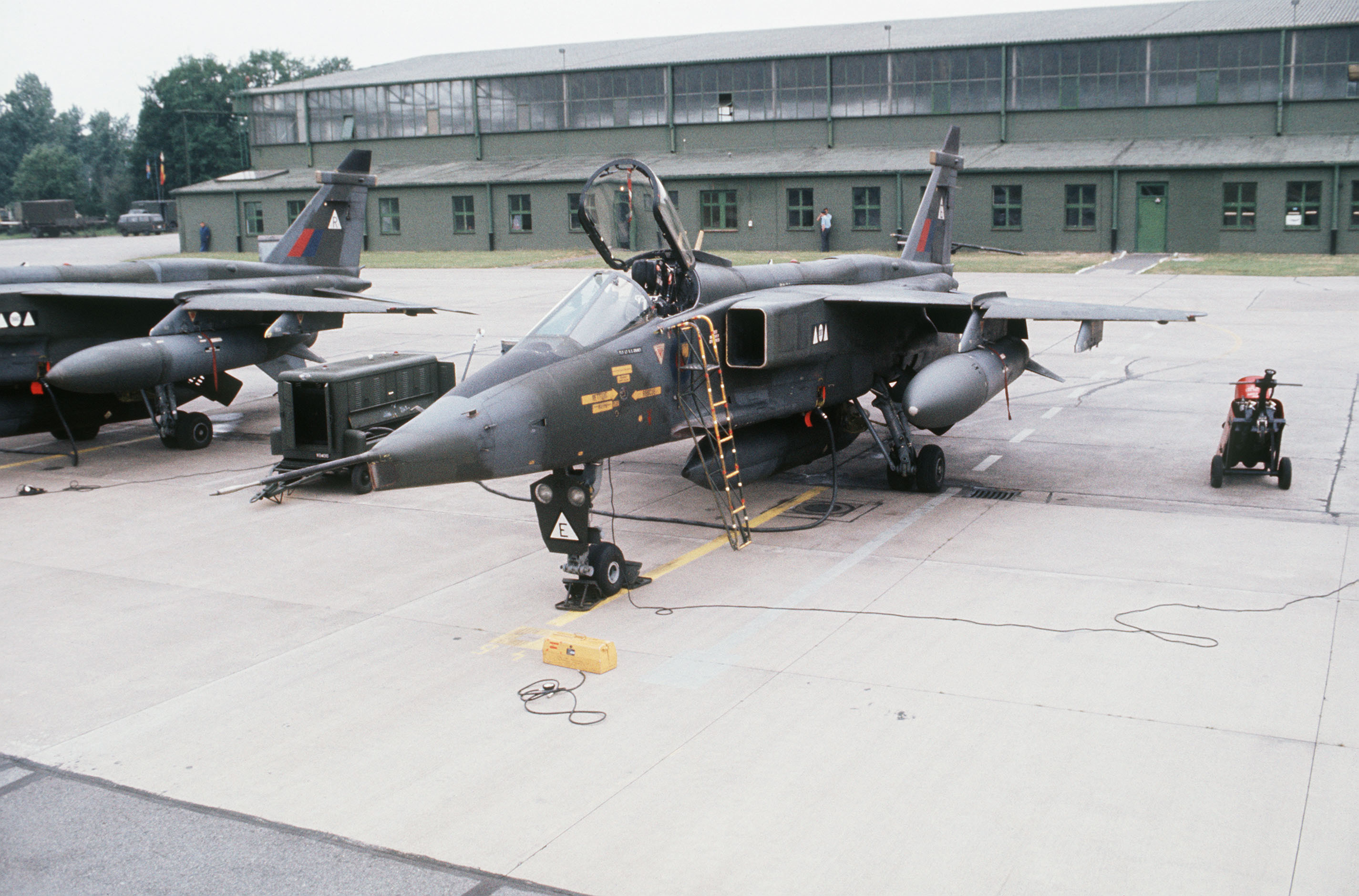
No. 2 Squadron Jaguar GR1s at RAF Wildenrath, Germany, in 1978.

In April 1975, a single Jaguar was used to test the aircraft's rough airstrip capacity, by landing and taking off multiple times from the M55 motorway, and the final test flight was conducted with a full weapons load. The ability was never used in service but was nonetheless considered useful as improvised runways might be the only runways left available in a large scale European conflict. In case of a war in Europe, the role of the Jaguar was to support land forces on the continent in resisting a Soviet assault on Western Europe, striking targets beyond the forward edge of the battlefield should a conflict escalate. The apparent mismatch between aircraft numbers and nuclear bombs was a consequence of RAF staff planners concluding that there would be one third attrition of Jaguars in an early conventional phase, leaving the survivors numerically strong enough to deliver the allocated stockpile of 56 nuclear bombs.

From December 1983, 75 Jaguar GR1s and 14 T2s were updated to the GR1A and T2A standards with the updated FIN1064 navigation and attack systems replacing the original NAVWASS. At about the same time, most were also re-engined with Adour 104 engines and were fitted with the ability to carry Sidewinder air to air missiles or AN-ALQ-101(V)-10 electronic countermeasures pods under the wings. The RAF Jaguar force was altered in late 1984, when 17 Squadron, 20 Squadron and 31 Squadron exchanged their Jaguars for Tornado GR1s, although their assignment to SACEUR and their wartime role remained unchanged. The two other RAF Germany units, 14 Squadron and 2 Squadron, followed suit in 1985 and 1989 respectively, which left the operational Jaguars concentrated across 6, 41 and 54 Squadrons at RAF Coltishall.

==== Gulf War ====
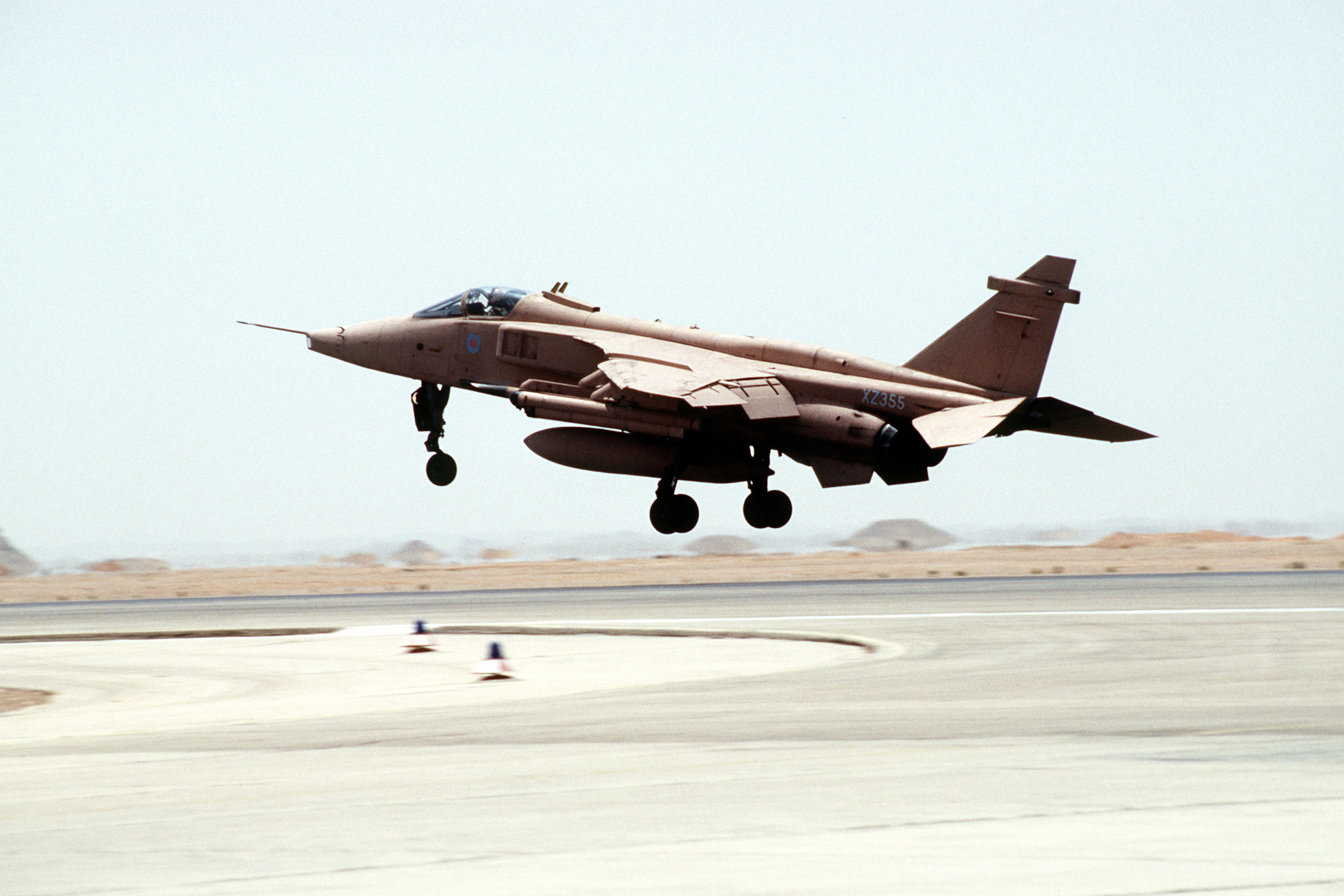
An RAF Jaguar from No. 41 Squadron deployed to RAFO Thumrait, in the Middle East, taking off to participate in Desert Shield.

Following the Iraqi invasion of Kuwait, on 9 August 1990 the British government assigned an initial 12 Jaguar GR1A and 12 Tornado F3 aircraft to the Middle East in Operation Granby, and these aircraft operated from bases in Bahrain and Oman. The RAF Jaguars were modified with updated navigation systems, and gained several new weapons. The Jaguars operated CRV7 rockets and the American CBU-87 cluster bombs as the RAF's existing BL755 bombs were designed for low-level release, and therefore unsuitable for higher-altitude operations common over the Persian Gulf. The RAF detachment of 12 Jaguars flew 612 combat sorties, with no aircraft lost. The XZ364 "Sadman" flew 47 missions, the highest number of missions of any RAF aircraft during the war. On 26 January, RAF Jaguars and Tornados raided several Silkworm missile batteries in Kuwait to encourage the perception of an imminent amphibious invasion to liberate the country. On the 30th, two RAF Jaguars destroyed a Polnochny-class landing ship with rockets and cannon. The Jaguars were returned from service in March 1991, at the end of the war.

==== Subsequent upgrades ====
In 1994, in order to meet an urgent need to increase the number of aircraft able to designate targets for laser-guided bombs, 10 GR1As and two T2As were upgraded with the capability to carry the TIALD laser designator pod and redesignated as GR1B and T2B respectively. TIALD equipped Jaguar GR1Bs were later deployed to Italy in August to take part in the Operation Deliberate Force against Bosnian Serb forces, being used to designate targets for RAF Harriers. During the Bosnian operations, a Jaguar of 41 Squadron carried out the first RAF bombing raid in Europe since the end of the Second World War fifty years before.

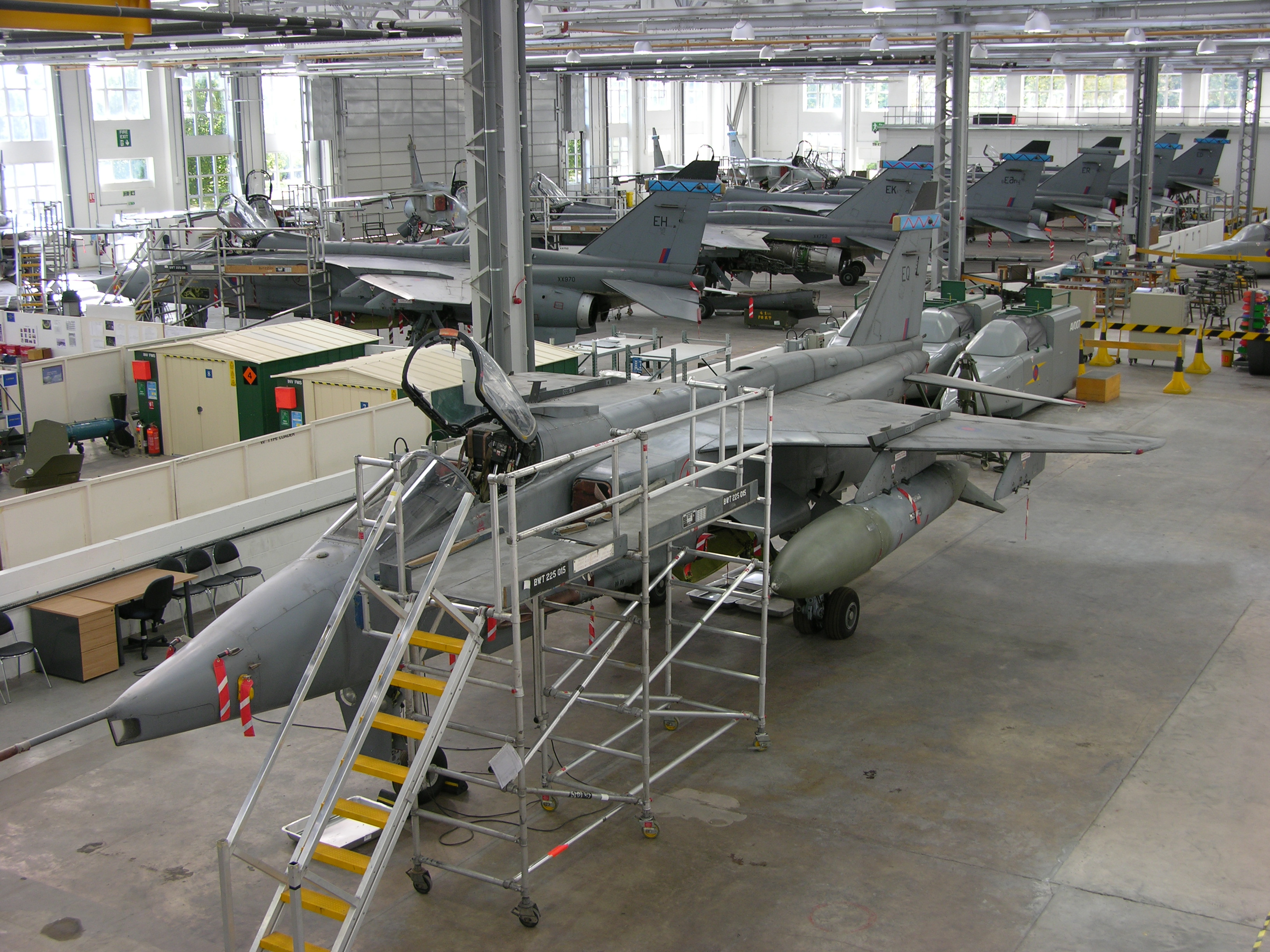
RAF Jaguars used as ground instructional airframes at RAF Cosford.

Following the success of the GR1B/T2B upgrade, the RAF launched a plan to upgrade its Jaguar fleet to a common standard, incorporating improvements introduced to some aircraft during the Gulf War, together with adding the ability to use TIALD and new reconnaissance pods. The upgrade came in two parts; the interim GR3 (Jaguar 96) upgrade, which was delivered in two standards, for recce and TIALD, and the further upgraded GR3A (Jaguar 97). All GR3As were subsequently re-engined with the new Adour 106 turbofan. The RAF's Jaguar 97s were intended to be wired for the carriage of ASRAAMs on the overwing launchers, but clearance of this weapon was never completed because of funding cuts.

The Jaguars did not see service in the 2003 invasion of Iraq; they had been planned to operate from bases in Turkey, to the north of Iraq, but Turkey refused access to its airbases and the northern attack was cancelled. Demands by the UK Treasury to cut the defence budget led to the Defence Secretary Geoff Hoon detailing plans on 21 July 2004 to withdraw the Jaguar by 2007. An expected out of service date of October 2007 was brought forward at just five days notice to 30 April 2007. On 20 December 2007, a Jaguar operated by Qinetiq undertook the last British military Jaguar flight. Following their retirement from flying service, many Jaguars have continued to serve as ground instructional airframes, most notably at RAF Cosford, used in the training of RAF fitters.

=== India ===
==== Initial procurement (1978–1986) ====
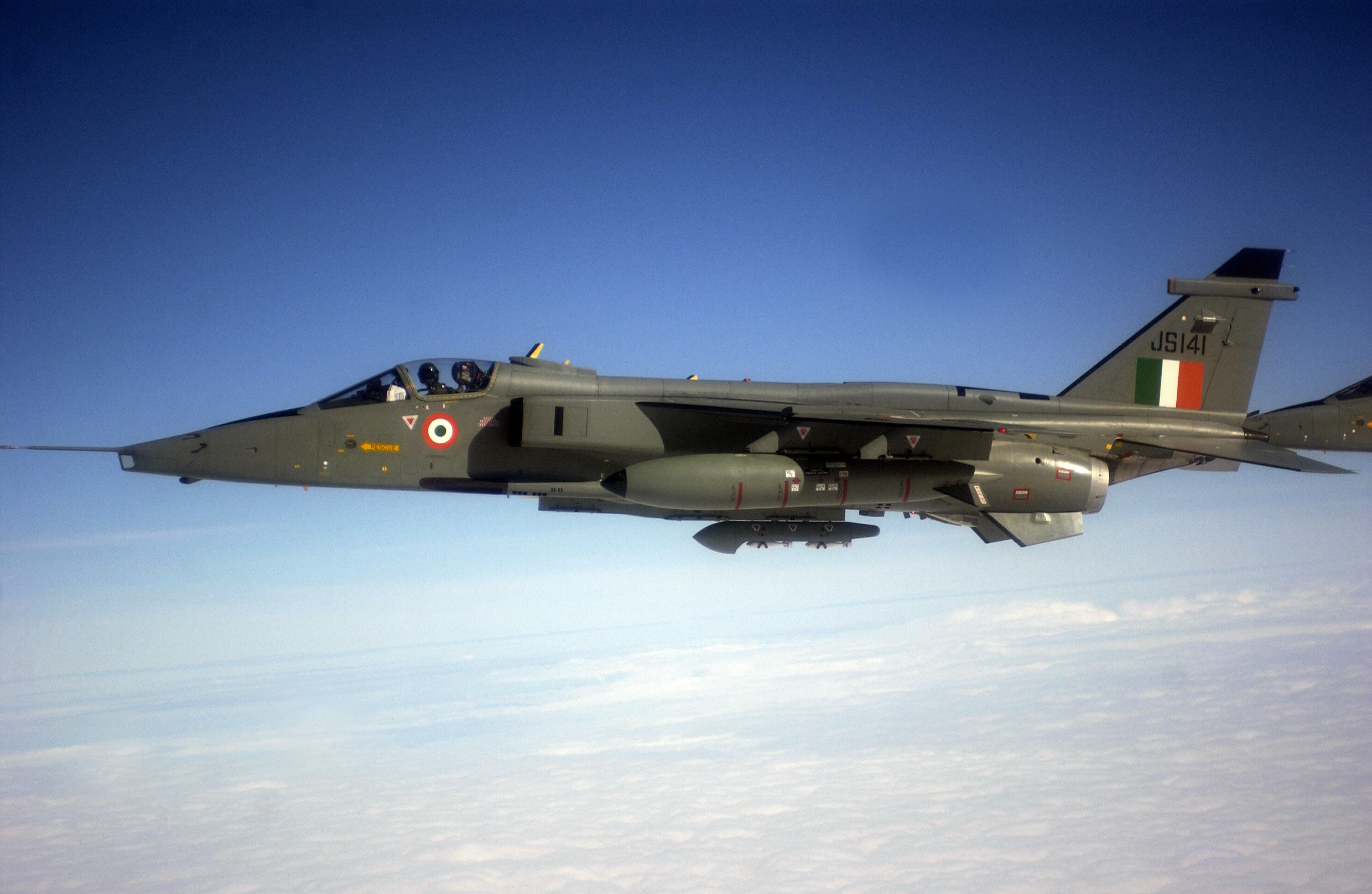
A Jaguar with the Indian Air Force

India had been approached as a possible customer for the Jaguar as early as 1968, but had declined, partly on the grounds that it was not yet clear at that time if the French and British would themselves accept the aircraft into service. During an evaluation flight by test pilots Jeffrey Quill and Jimmy Dell, the IAF was not very highly impressed by the prototypes sent to India, though they liked the low-cost offer. The IAF already had its indigenous HF-24 Marut fighter-bomber, and tried to upgrade it, until the project collapsed. In 1978, the Indian Air Force (IAF) became the largest export customer, with a $1 billion order for the Jaguar aircraft, which was chosen ahead of the Dassault Mirage F1 and the Saab Viggen after a long evaluation process, though the Viggen was considered the front-runner for the deal. The order included 40 aircraft to be built at Warton, and the 120 aircraft to be licence-built at Hindustan Aeronautics Limited (HAL). British Prime Minister James Callaghan was influential in the deal and gave an unequivocal commitment that Britain would speed-up deliveries of the aircraft. It was named as Shamsher ("Sword of Justice").

As an interim measure, 18 RAF Jaguars were loaned to the IAF with the first two loaned aircraft operational with Western Air Command on 27 July 1979. The First two aircraft, a strike and Trainer variant were ferried from Warton to Jamnagar. They were shadowed during most of the flight by F-14 Tomcats from the USS Kitty Hawk. The first aircraft built for the IAF was delivered in March 1981, and the delivery of the first batch of 35 Jaguar IS and five Jaguar IB aircraft were completed by 1981. The first kits for the assembly of the aircraft by the HAL was shipped from the United Kingdom in May 1981. The loaned aircraft were returned in phases between 1982 and 1984. In the following phases, 80 more aircraft (58 Jaguar IS, 10 Jaguar IB and 12 Jaguar IM) were built by the HAL, with few of the parts sourced from India. The original BAe manufactured Jaguars used Adour Mk 804 engines, while Mk 811 engines were adopted in the HAL production line, producing a higher thrust of 8,400 lbf each. The BAe made aircraft used the NAVWASS (NAVigation and Weapon-Aiming Sub-System) avionics suite, while HAL-built Jaguars were equipped with an indigenously developed DARIN (Display Attack and Ranging Inertial Navigation) avionics suite.

==== Combat and nuclear deterrence (1987–1999) ====
The IAF Jaguars were used to carry out reconnaissance missions in support of the Indian Peace Keeping Force in Sri Lanka between 1987 and 1990. The IAF placed an order for additional 15 IS aircraft in 1993. As the aircraft aged, the avionics lacked suitable components for the ground attack missions, such as terrain-following radar, GPS navigation or modern night-flight systems. Consequently, upgrades were carried out in the mid-1990s across several phases, including the installation of new avionics, radars, flight control systems, and Litening targeting pods. Following the Indian development of nuclear weapons, the Jaguars are one of the IAF aircraft capable of performing the nuclear strike role with reasonable chances of success. However, the Indian military decided against developing the Jaguar into an active nuclear platform because of its lack of ground clearance for deploying India's gravity-dropped nuclear bombs.

The IAF Jaguars played an active role in the 1999 Kargil War with Pakistan, dropping unguided and laser-guided bombs, with the IAF defining its role as a "deep penetrating strike aircraft".

==== Further orders and upgrades (2000-present) ====
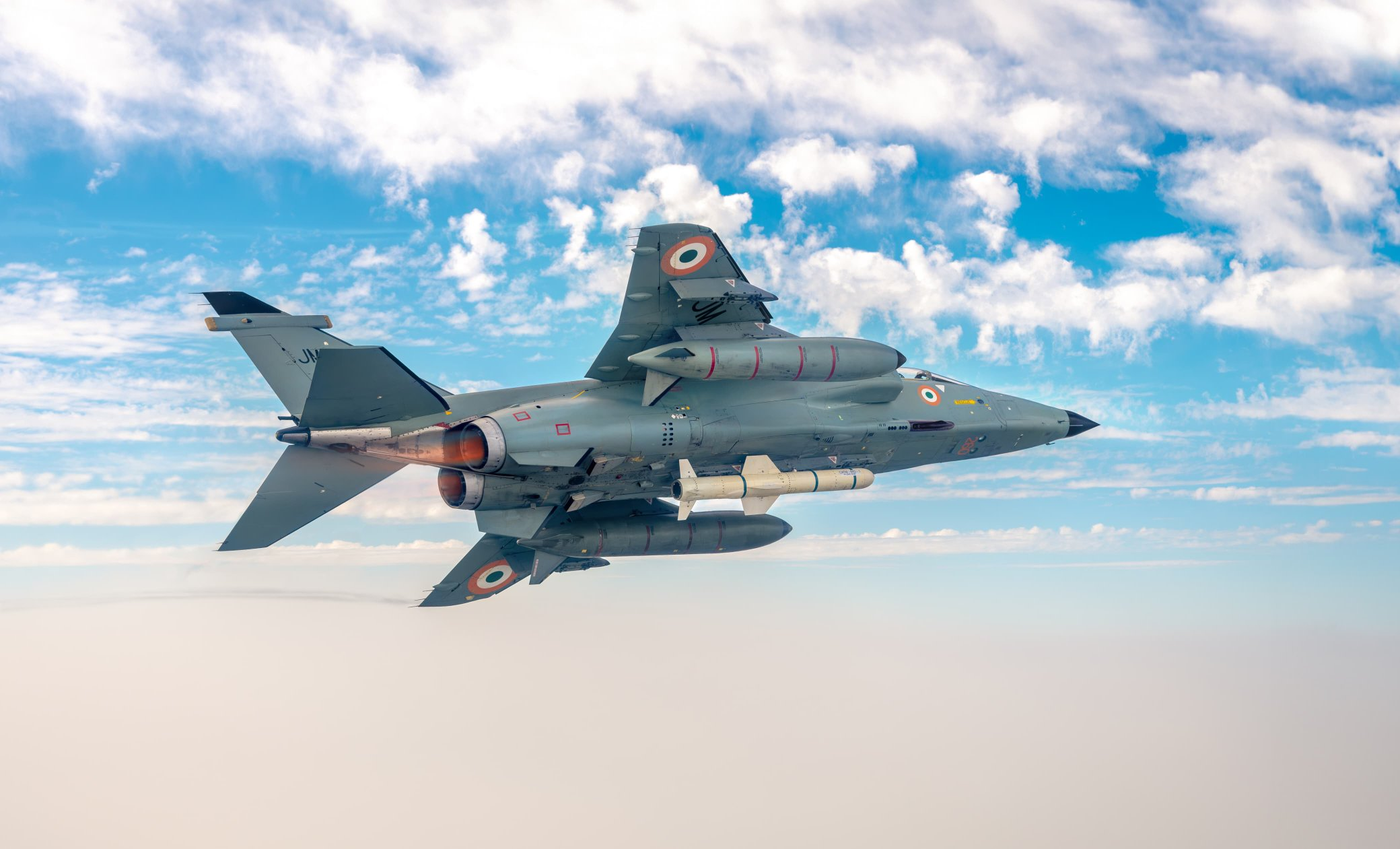
Maritime strike version of the IAF Jaguar, armed with a Harpoon missile

India placed an order for 17 additional Jaguar trainer (IB) aircraft from HAL in 1999 and a further 20 strike aircraft (IS) in 2001–2002. The maritime strike version of the Jaguar (IM) is equipped with the Sea Eagle missile, which were tested at the decommissioned INS Hosdurg in June 2000. In the 2010s, the IAF began a process of upgrading the existing Jaguars in the fleet to extend its service life by another 20 years. The upgrades included the installation of DARIN III avionics suite consisting of a new multi mode radar, addition of auto-pilot and other changes. Structural modifications were also carried out on the air frame to accommodate the increased weight and the new components. While it was proposed to fit the aircraft with more powerful Honeywell F125IN engines, the plan was dropped due to budget constraints.

In 2018, India cannibalised 31 airframes purchased from France, 2 airframes each from the UK and Oman, for spares. As part of technology transfer agreement with Israeli Aerospace Industries, HAL manufactured 54 EL/M-2052 AESA radar for the Jaguar IS aircraft, the first of which was ready in 2021. In 2024, the IAF announced plans to retire the oldest batch of 60 aircraft from 2028 to 2031 and replace them with 4.5 generation aircraft like HAL Tejas Mk1A, while the rest would be upgraded to DARIN III configuration, with EL/M-2052 radar and ASRAAM air-to-air missiles. As of 2024, 60 aircraft had been upgraded to DARIN III standards.

In early 2025, the IAF lost three Jaguars to crashes. On 7 March 2025, a Jaguar IS aircraft crashed in Panchkula district, after taking off from Ambala Air Force Station and the pilot ejected safely after maneuvering the jet away from residential areas. On 2 April 2025, a Jaguar IB crashed near Jamnagar Air Force Station during a night training sortie, killing one of the pilots. On 9 July 2025, another Jaguar IB trainer crashed in Ratnagarh in Rajasthan, killing both the pilots. During the 2025 India Pakistan conflict, the IAF Jaguars were used to strike military bases in Pakistan using Rampage missiles.

In December 2025, India acquired 20 retired Jaguar aircraft from Oman, which would be dismantled for spare parts, to be used in the existing Jaguar fleet of the IAF. India previously sought French assistance for spare parts back in 2018-2019. During the Republic day parade on 26 January 2026, the IAF showcased its Jaguars armed with Astra missiles on overwing rails. In April 2026, the Indian ministry of defence invited bids for the integration of ASRAAM missiles to replace the in-service R550 missiles onboard 74 Jaguar aircraft of the Indian Air Force, with the project planned to be executed across six air force stations where the squadrons are based and at the HAL facility at Bengaluru. In June 2026, the IAF decided to acquire 9 more airframes from the UK for spare parts.

=== Other operators ===
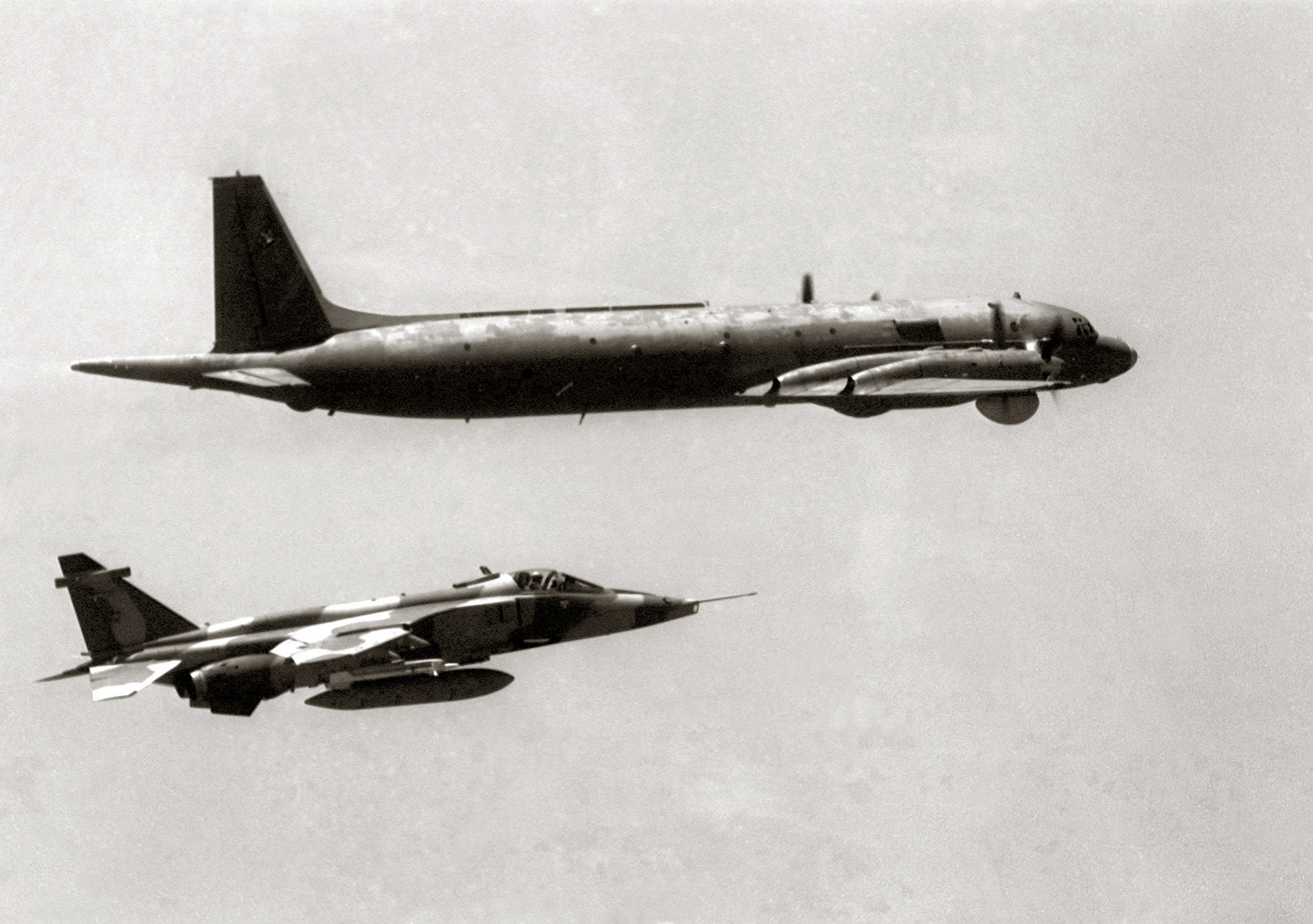
A Royal Air Force of Oman Jaguar S(O) intercepting a Soviet Il-38 in 1987

The Jaguar International export version was sold to Ecuador, Nigeria, and Oman. The Ecuadorian Air Force, the only Latin American export customer, purchased 10 single- and 2 two-seat variants, officially designated as Jaguar ES and EB, respectively. The first of twelve aircraft was delivered in January 1977. They were used mainly for ground attack roles and occasionally for air superiority duties during the Cenepa War with Peru in 1995, but the main part of the fleet was held in reserve in case of a wider conflict with the Peruvians. Nigeria ordered 13 single-seat SN and 5 two-seat BN variants, and SEPECAT delivered the first of these in May 1984. A subsequent order for an 18-aircraft second batch was cancelled. Some of those in service were withdrawn from operations on the grounds of economy, with the remaining aircraft eventually also placed in storage and put up for re-sale; the aircraft were found to be in poor condition, and all attempts to sell them failed.

The Royal Air Force of Oman ordered 10 single-seat and 2 two-seat variants, designated as Jaguars OS and OB respectively, and the first aircraft was delivered in March 1977. A second identical 12-aircraft order was placed in the mid-1980s, which were joined by two secondhand Indian and RAF examples. The last of the Omani aircraft were retired on 6 August 2014. The remaining 20 in storage was later donated by Oman to India for use as spare parts by the IAF.

=== Failed bids ===
In 1969, while still in the prototype stage of development, formal approaches were made various countries including Switzerland, Japan, Australia, the Netherlands, Belgium, and Germany, promoting the aircraft for sale. Japan began negotiations towards licensed production of the Jaguar, but these plans failed in part because of the high royalty payments sought by SEPECAT. A proposal for Turkey to construct Jaguars under licence also did not come to fruition. Kuwait initially ordered 50 Jaguars and 16 Mirage 5s, but later chose the Mirage F1CK. While Pakistan initially approached SEPECAT after the US refused to sell its aircraft of choice, the LTV A-7 Corsair II, due to an arms embargo, it eventually opted for the Dassault Mirage 5.

== Variants ==
Jaguar A
Single-seat all-weather tactical strike, ground-attack fighter version for the French Air Force, two prototypes and 160 production aircraft built.

Jaguar B/Jaguar T2

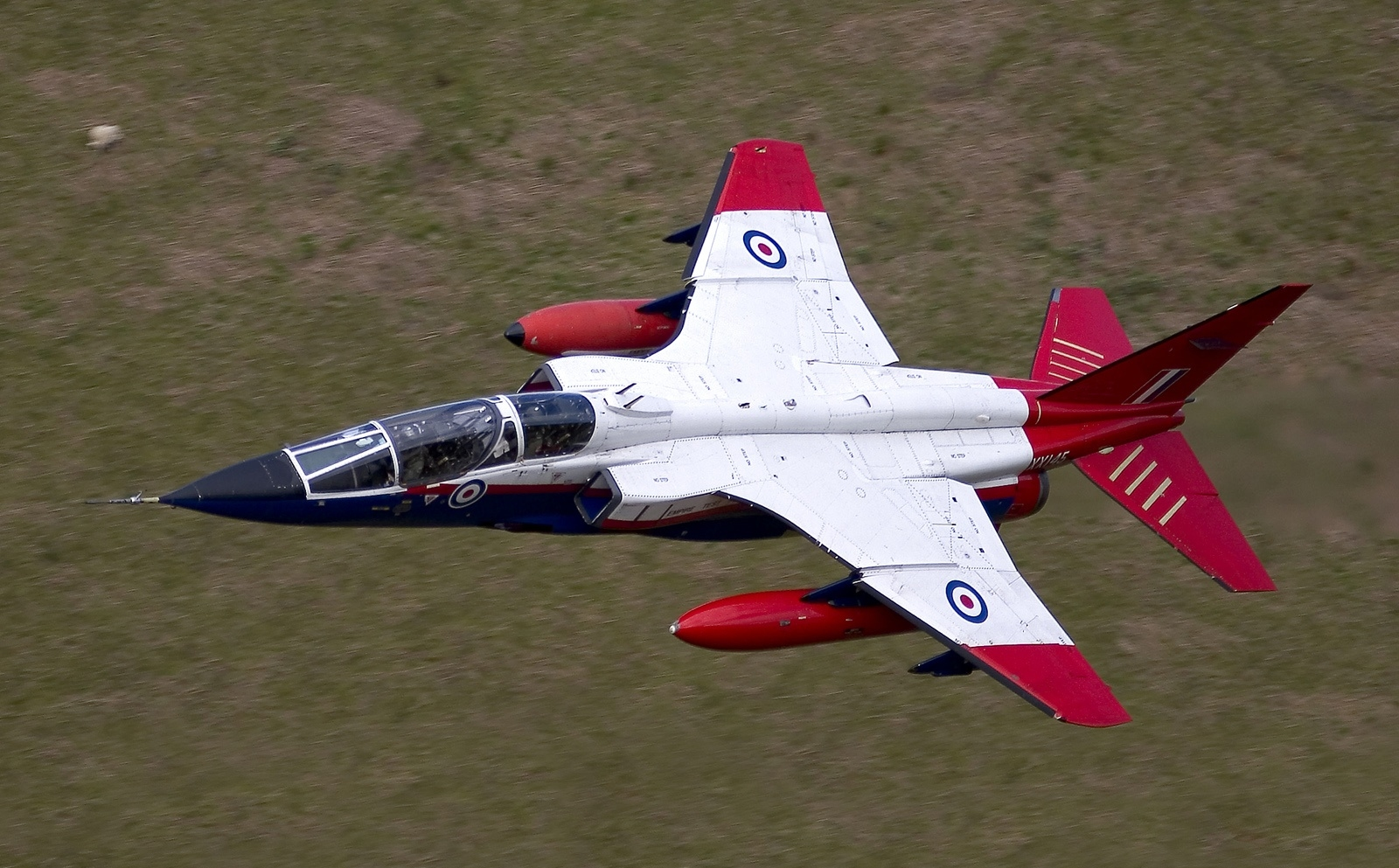
Jaguar T2 operated by the Empire Test Pilots' School in 2005

Two-seat training version for the Royal Air Force, one prototype and 38 production aircraft built. Capable of secondary role of strike and ground attack. Two flown by Empire Test Pilots School and one by Institute of Aviation Medicine. Equipped for inflight refueling and with a single Aden cannon.

Jaguar T2A

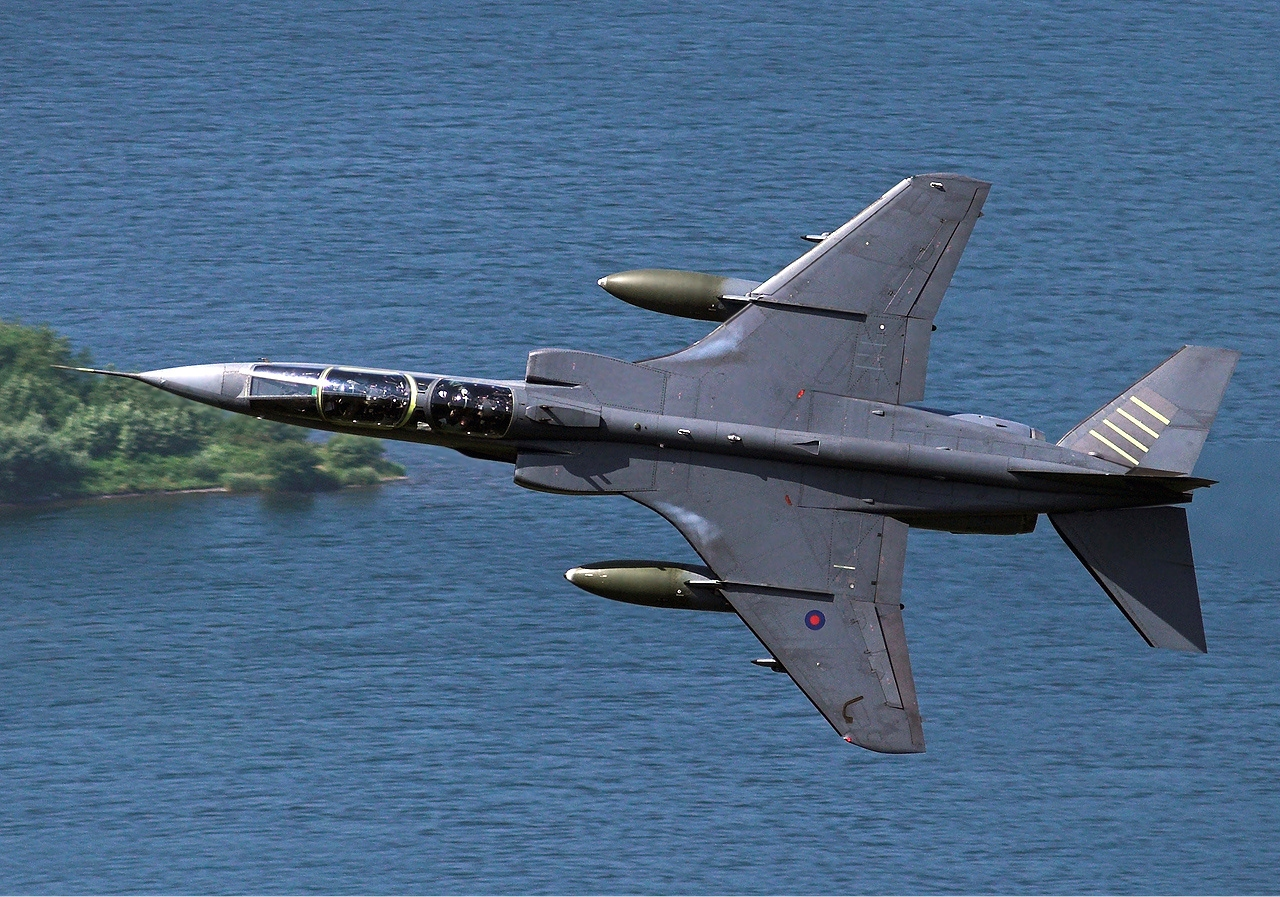
Jaguar T2A of the Royal Air Force

Jaguar T2 upgrade similar to GR1A, 14 conversions from T2.

Jaguar T2B

Two Jaguar T2A aircraft given TIALD capability. An "unofficial" designation.

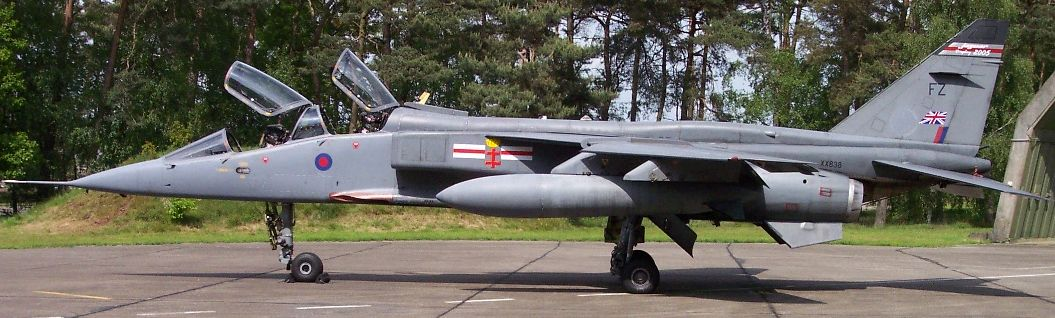
Jaguar T4 two-seat trainer of the Royal Air Force

Jaguar T4
Jaguar T2A upgraded to Jaguar 96 standard.

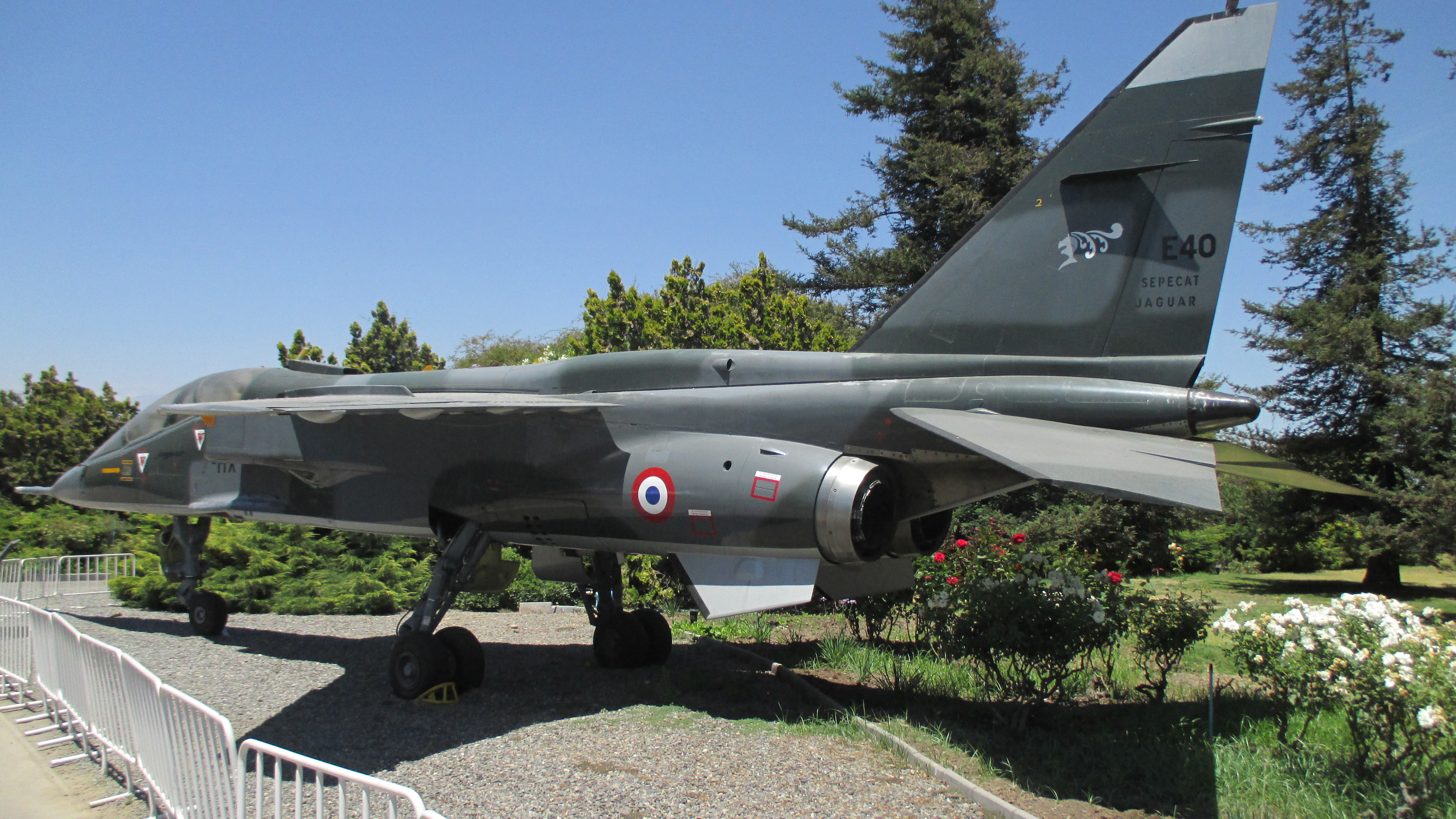
Jaguar E of the French Air Force

Jaguar E
Two-seat training version for the French Air Force, two prototypes and 40 production aircraft built.
Jaguar S / Jaguar GR1
Single-seat all-weather tactical strike, ground-attack fighter version for the Royal Air Force, 165 built. Equipped with NAVigation and Weapon Aiming Sub-System (NAVWASS) for attacking without use of radar, and Ferranti laser ranger and marked target seeker. Adour Mk 104 engines used from 1978.

Jaguar GR1A
Jaguar GR1 with navigation (NAVWASS II), chaff/flare, ECM and Sidewinder capability upgrades, 75 conversions from GR1.

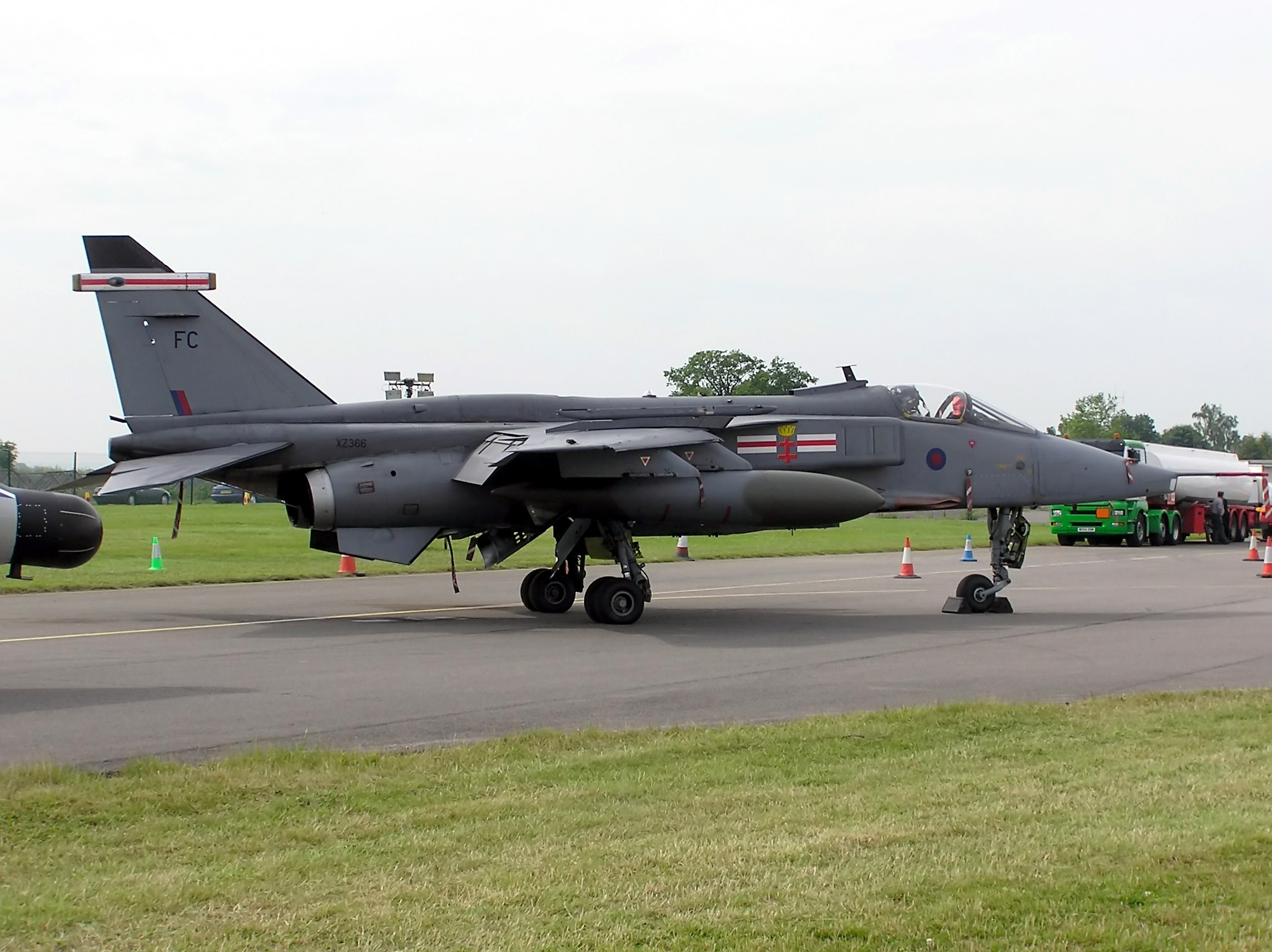
Jaguar GR3A of 41 Squadron RAF, at Kemble Airfield

Jaguar GR1B
Ten GR1 aircraft modified to carry TIALD pods.
Jaguar GR3
Jaguar 96 avionics upgrade to GR1A.
Jaguar GR3A
Jaguar 97 avionics upgrade to GR1B/GR3.

Jaguar M
Single-seat naval strike prototype for the French Navy, one built.
Jaguar Active Control Technology
One Jaguar converted into a research aircraft.

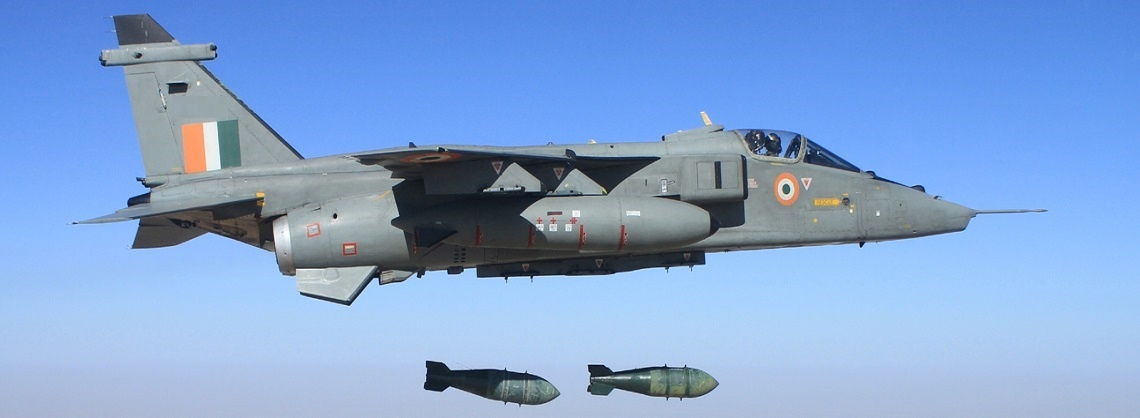
Jaguar IS of the Indian Air Force

Jaguar International
Export versions based on either the Jaguar S or Jaguar B.

Jaguar ES
Export version of the Jaguar S for the Ecuadorian Air Force, 10 built.
Jaguar EB
Export version of the Jaguar B for the Ecuadorian Air Force, two built.
Jaguar S(O)
Export version of the Jaguar S for the Royal Air Force of Oman, 20 built.
Jaguar B(O)
Export version of the Jaguar B for the Royal Air Force of Oman, four built.
Jaguar IS
Single-seat all-weather tactical strike, ground-attack fighter for the Indian Air Force, 35 built by BAe and 89 built by HAL (Shamser).
Jaguar IB
Two-seat training version for the Indian Air Force, five built by BAe and 27 built by HAL.
Jaguar IM
Single-seat maritime strike aircraft for the Indian Air Force. Fitted with Agave radar and capable of carrying Sea Eagle anti-ship missile, 12 built by HAL. Refitted with the Elta EL/M-2052 radar set under the DARIN III upgrade program.
Jaguar SN
Export version of the Jaguar S for the Nigerian Air Force, 13 built.
Jaguar BN
Export version of the Jaguar B for the Nigerian Air Force, five built.

Jaguar MAX
HAL-developed upgrade for the Indian Air Force fleet of S, M and B variants. The upgrade suite was unveiled in February 2019 and includes new avionics, a reworked cockpit and integration of modern armaments.

== Operators ==
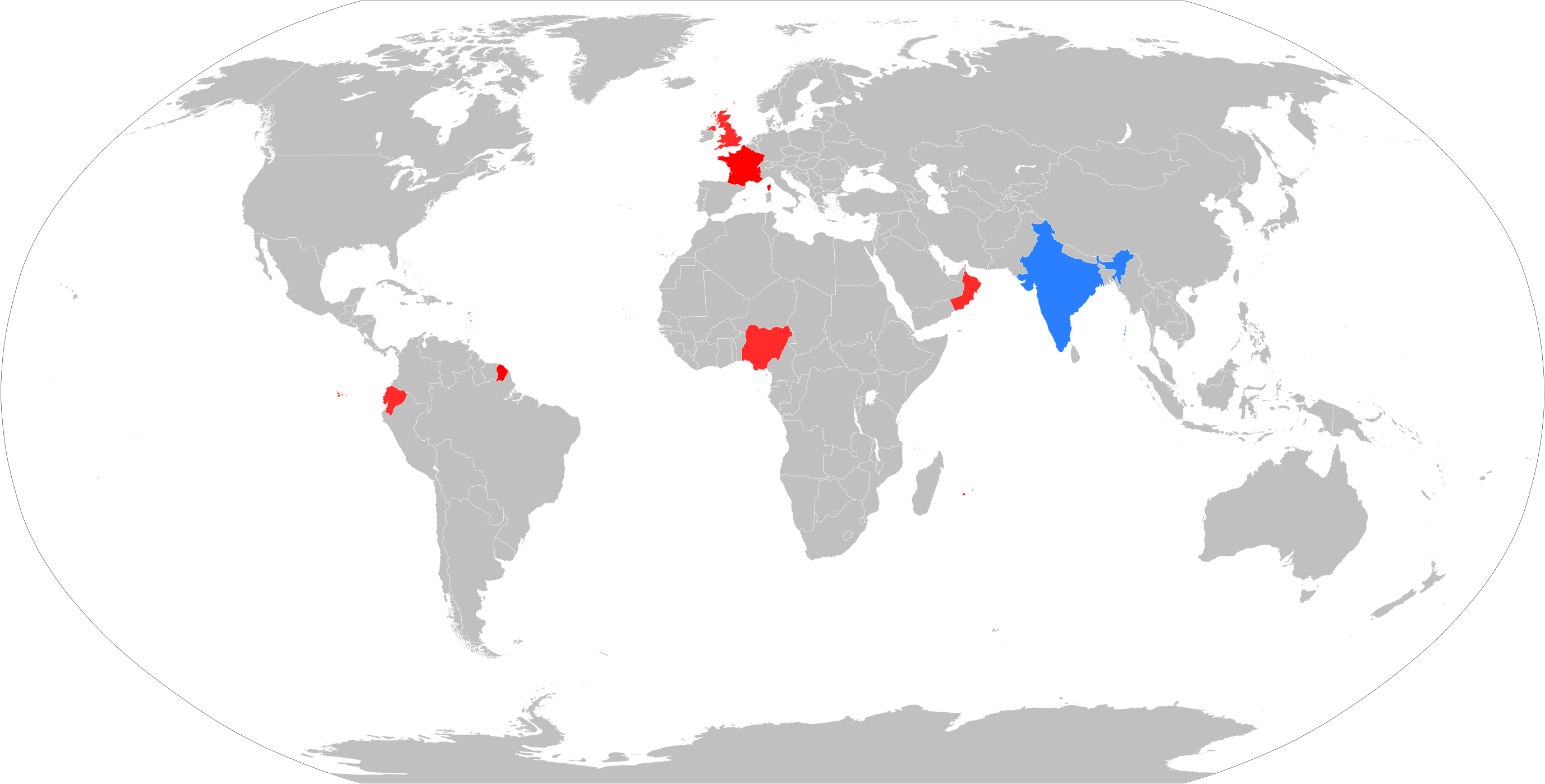
Current operator(s) Former operators

=== Current ===
India

- Indian Air Force
  - Ambala AFS, Haryana
    - No. 5 Squadron "Tuskers", with Direct Supply (i.e. UK built) Jaguar IS and IB from August 1981.
    - No. 14 Squadron "Bulls", Operational from September 1980 with loaned RAF Jaguar GR1s and T2s, and re-equipped with Direct Supply Jaguar IS and IBs from March 1981.
  - Gorakhpur AFS, Uttar Pradesh
    - No. 16 Squadron "Cobras", Equipped with Indian-built Jaguar IS and IB from October 1986.
    - No. 27 Squadron "Flaming Arrows", Equipped with Indian-built Jaguar IS and IB from June 1985
  - Jamnagar AFS, Gujarat
    - No. 224 Squadron "Warlords", Reequipped with Indian-built Jaguars from March 2008.
    - No. 6 Squadron "Dragons", with Jaguar IM, IS, IB from 1987.

=== Former operators ===
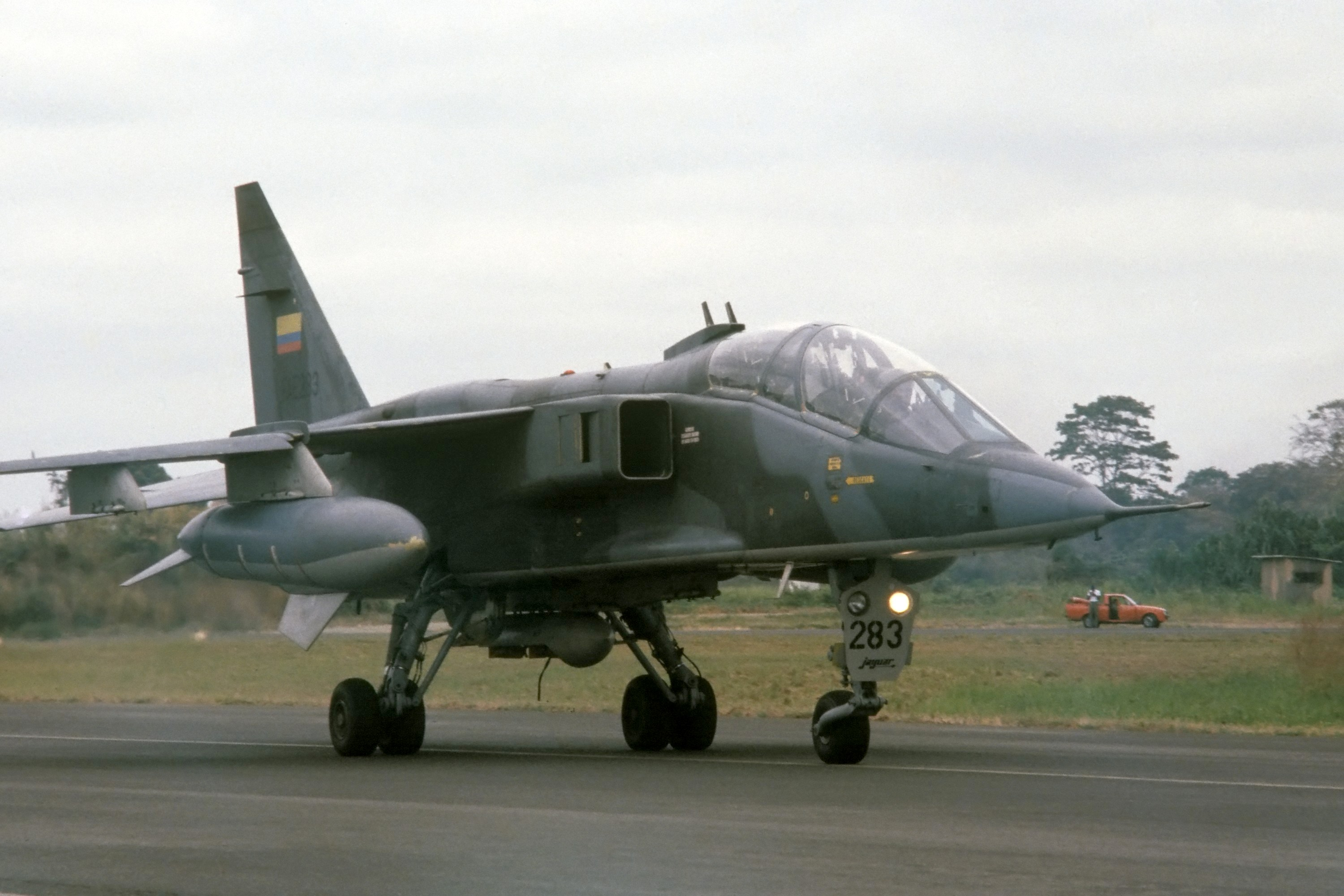
A twin-seat Jaguar EB of the Ecuadorian Air Force.

Ecuador

- Ecuadorian Air Force – ordered 10 single-seat EBs and 2 two-seat ESs in 1974, with the aircraft being delivered in 1977. It purchased 3 ex-RAF Jaguar GR.1s as attrition replacements in 1991.
  - Escuadron de Combate 2111 "Águilas" (Eagles)

France

- French Air Force – all retired
  - Escadron de Chasse 3/3 "Ardennes" at Nancy (1977–1987)
  - Escadron de Chasse 1/7 "Provence" at St Dizier. Re-equipped with Jaguars in May 1973 and declared operational September 1974. It discarded the Jaguar in July 2005, the last French squadron to operate the Jaguar.
  - Escadron de Chasse 2/7 "Argonne" at St Dizier. French Jaguar OCU. Formed October 1974 It was disbanded in June 2001.
  - Escadron de Chasse 3/7 "Languedoc" at St Dizier. Received first Jaguars in March 1974 and operational in July 1975. Disbanded July 1997.
  - Escadron de Chasse 4/7 "Limousin". Formed April 1980 at St Dizier, but soon moved to Istres. Disbanded July 1989.
  - Escadron de Chasse 1/11 "Roussillon" at Toul. Operational March 1976. Disbanded June 1994.
  - Escadron de Chasse 2/11 "Vosges" at Toul. Operational June 1977. Disbanded July 1996.
  - Escadron de Chasse 3/11 "Corse" at Toul. Received Jaguars February 1975. Disbanded July 1997.
  - Escadron de Chasse 4/11 "Jura" at Bordeaux-Mérignac. Formed August 1978, disbanded June 1992.

Nigeria

- Nigerian Air Force ordered 13 Jaguar SNs & 5 Jaguar BNs in 1983, with delivery from 1984, being operated by a squadron at Makurdi. Withdrawn from use in 1991 as an economy measure. 14 examples were offered as a bulk lot purchase by Inter Avia Group on behalf of the Nigerian Air Force. (11 single-seat fighters and three trainers)

Oman

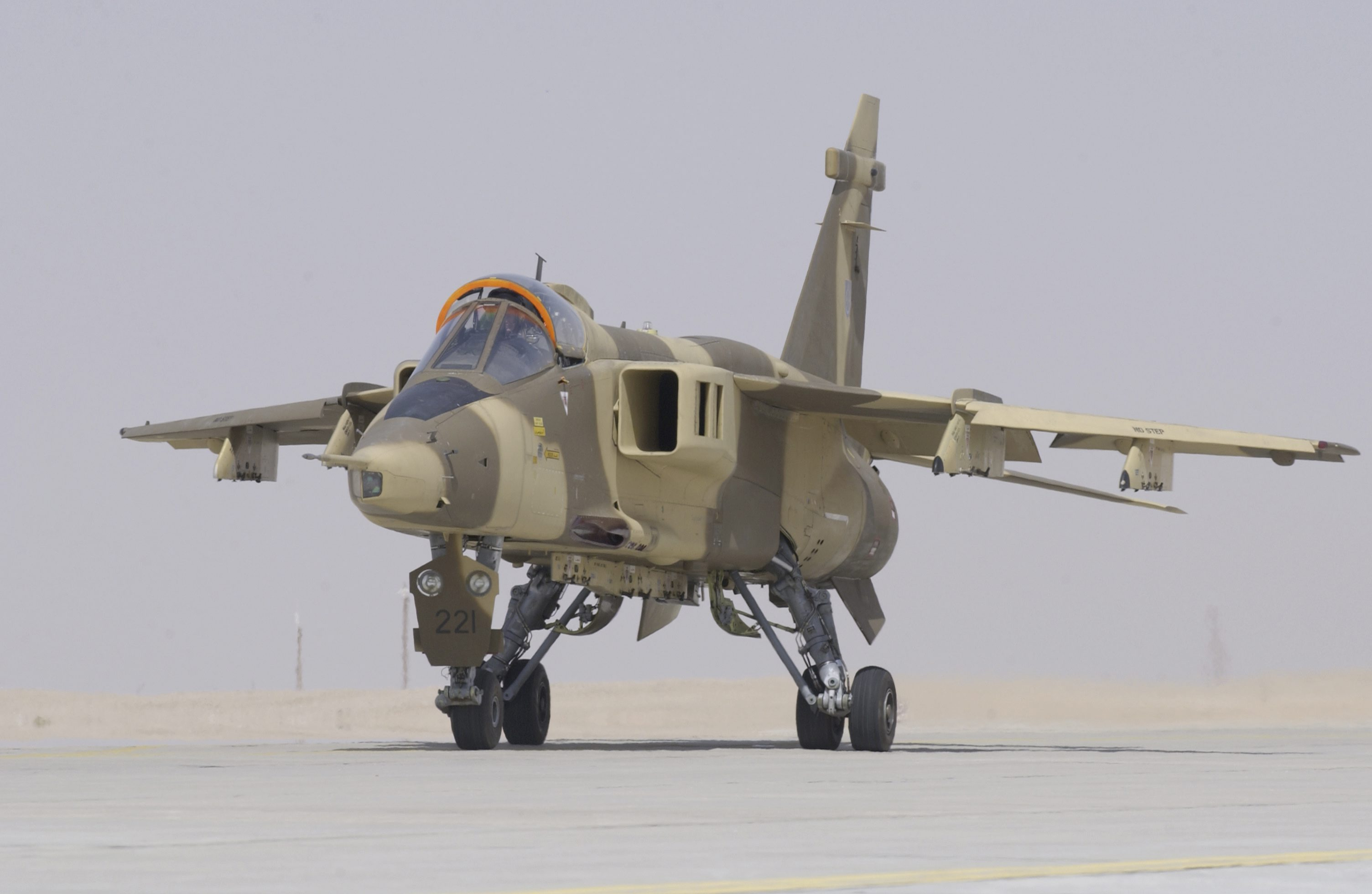
A Royal Air Force of Oman Jaguar

- Royal Air Force of Oman purchased 10 Jaguar OSs and two Jaguar OBs in 1974, with an identical order following in 1980, supplementing these aircraft by an ex-RAF Jaguar T2 and GR1 in 1982 and 1986 respectively. Oman's Jaguars were brought to full GR3A standards during the 1990s. Oman's last four operational Jaguars were retired on 6 August 2014. Decommissioned jets sent to India.
  - No. 8 Squadron RAFO at RAFO Thumrait.
  - No. 20 Squadron RAFO at RAFO Thumrait.

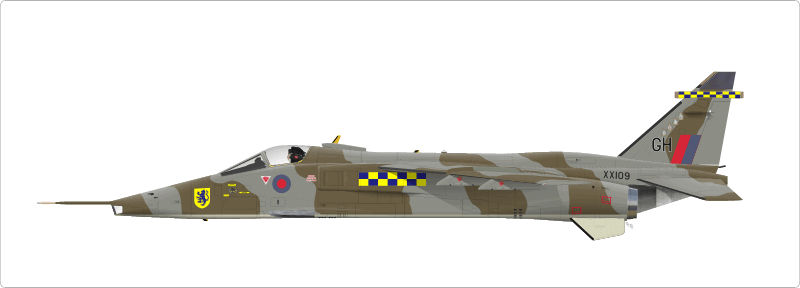
SEPECAT Jaguar GR1 XX109 of 54 Squadron

United Kingdom

- Royal Air Force – all flying examples retired
  - No. 2 Squadron. Jaguar GR.1/s replaced 2 Squadron's Phantoms at RAF Laarbruch, Germany in 1976, with a main role of tactical reconnaissance. It re-equipped with Tornado GR1As in 1988.
  - No. 6 Squadron Jaguar GR.1A/GR.3/GR.3As formed at RAF Lossiemouth in October 1974, moving to RAF Coltishall in November 1974, serving in the attack role. It moved to RAF Coningsby in April 2006, disbanding in May 2007.
  - No. 14 Squadron Jaguar GR.1/GR.1As replaced its Phantoms with Jaguars in 1974, based at RAF Bruggen. Its Jaguars were replaced by Tornados in 1985.
  - No. 16 (Reserve) Squadron, JaguarGR.1/GR.1A/GR.3/T.4s the OCU was formed at RAF Lossiemouth by renumbering 226 OCU, later moving Coltishall and finally disbanding in March 2005.
  - No. 17 Squadron at RAF Bruggen replaced its Phantoms in the strike role with JaguarGR.1s from 1975 to 1976, and re-equipped with Tornados in 1984–85.
  - No. 20 Squadron Jaguar GR.1s formed at RAF Bruggen in February 1977 in the strike role, disbanding in June 1984.
  - No. 31 Squadron Jaguar GR.1/GR.1As based at RAF Bruggen replaced its Phantoms in 1976 in the strike role. Its Jaguars were replaced by Tornados in 1984.
  - No. 41 Squadron Jaguar GR.1/GR.1A/GR.3/GR.3As formed at RAF Coltishall in 1976 in the reconnaissance role. It disbanded in April 2006.
  - No. 54 Squadron Jaguar GR.1/GR.1A/GR.3/GR.3As formed at RAF Lossiemouth in March 1974 in the attack role, moving to RAF Coltishall in August 1974. It disbanded in March 2005.
  - No. 226 OCU (Operational Conversion Unit) GR.1/GR.1A/T.2/T.2A/T.4s, formed at RAF Lossiemouth in October 1974 and was redesignated No. 16 (Reserve) Squadron in September 1991.
  - Jaguar Conversion Team at RAF Lossiemouth (initial OCU).
  - No. 1 School of Technical Training RAF 42 non-flying examples used for maintenance training.
- Empire Test Pilots' School.

== Aircraft on display ==
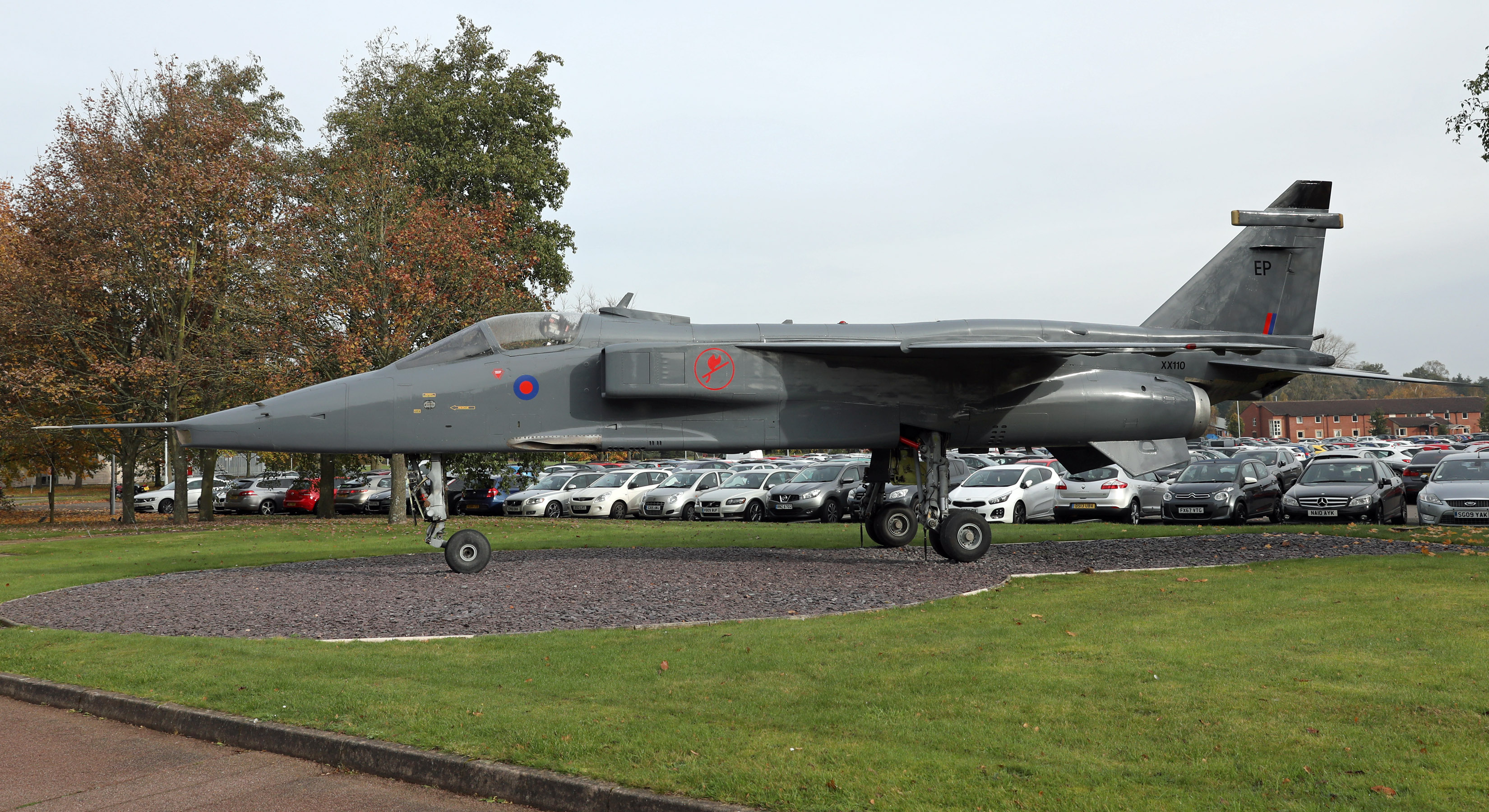
Jaguar XX110, gate guardian at RAF Cosford

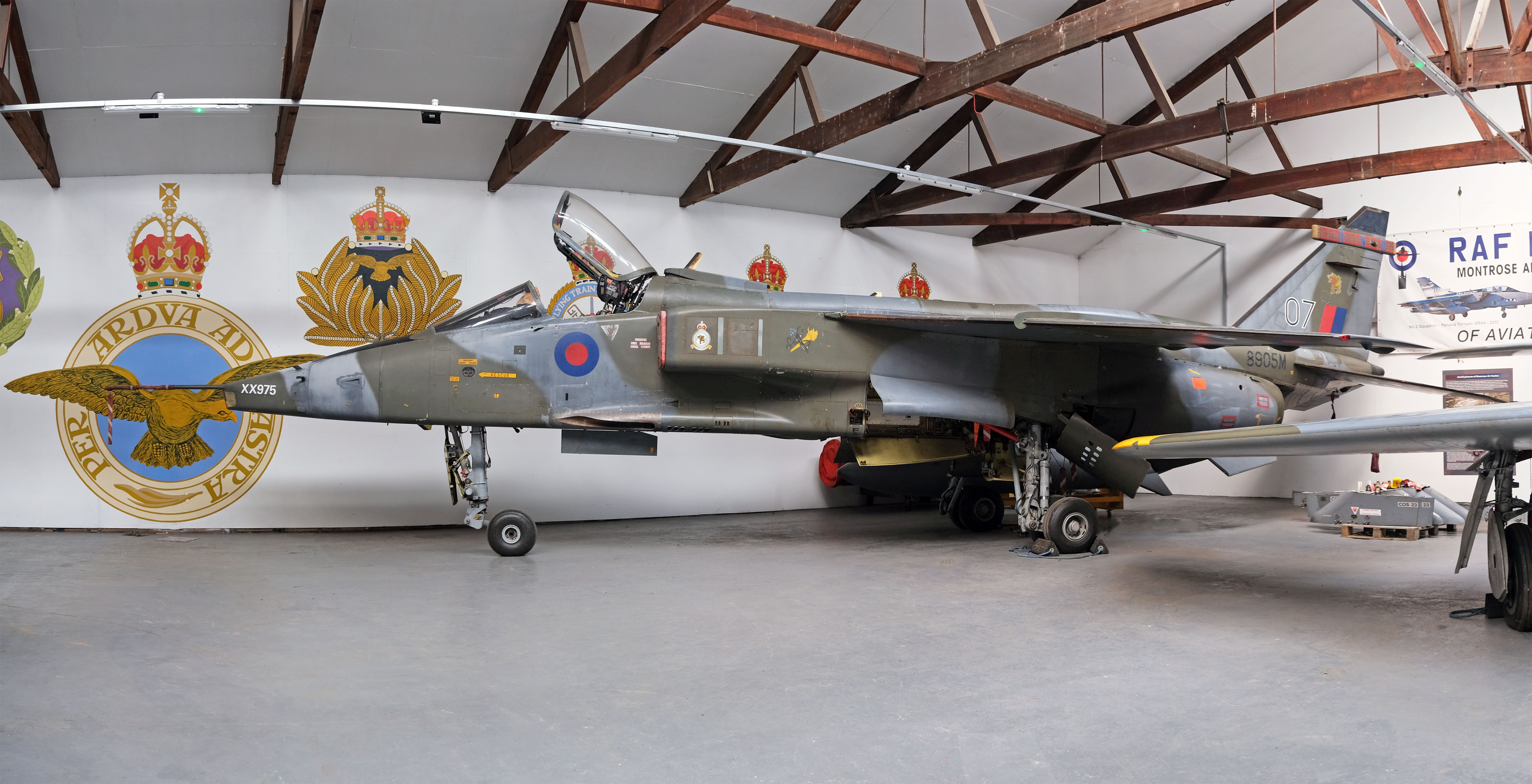
Jaguar GR1 XX975 at Montrose Air Station Museum, Angus, Scotland

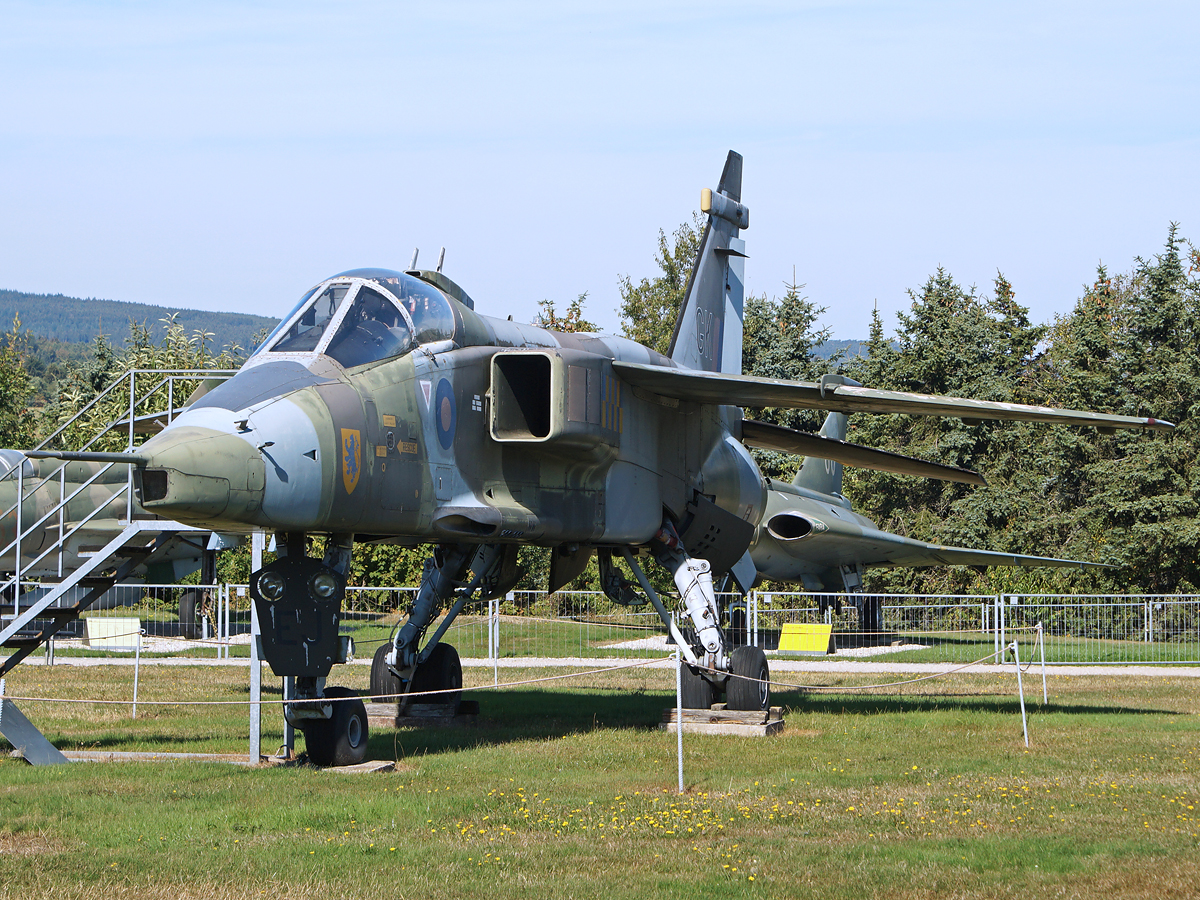
Jaguar XX985, at Flugausstellung Hermeskeil, Germany

=== France ===
- A91 Jaguar A, Gulf-war veteran with damage from an Iraqi SAM at Musée de l'air et de l'espace
- A Jaguar E is on display at Musée Aeroscopia.

=== Germany ===
- XX985 is displayed at Flugausstellung Hermeskeil.

=== Poland ===
- XX730 Jaguar GR1 on display at the Polish Aviation Museum

=== United Kingdom ===
- XW563 Jaguar GR1 (former gate guardian of RAF Bruggen then RAF Coltishall) is displayed in the grounds of County Hall, Norfolk County Council, given the name Spirit of Coltishall
- XX108 Jaguar GR1B is displayed at the Norfolk and Suffolk aviation museum.
- XX109 Jaguar GR1 at the City of Norwich Aviation Museum in Horsham St Faith, Norfolk. (Note: the museum also has the cockpit of T.2A XX830)
- XX146 Jaguar T.4 at the Solway Aviation Museum, Carlisle Airport, Cumbria.
- XX734 Jaguar GR1 at BDAC Old Sarum Airfield Museum, Old Sarum, Wiltshire
- XX741 Jaguar GR1A is in taxiable condition at the Bentwaters Airfield, Suffolk.
- XX763 Jaguar GR1 at the Bournemouth Aviation Museum, Dorset.
- XX975 Jaguar GR1 at the Montrose Air Station Museum, Montrose, Angus, Scotland.
- XZ106 Jaguar GR3 at the RAF Manston History Museum, Manston Airport, Kent.
- XZ119 Jaguar GR1A at the National Museum of Flight, East Fortune Airfield, East Lothian.
- XZ369 Jaguar GR3A at the East Midlands Areopark, Leicestershire.
- XZ383 Jaguar GR1 at the Yorkshire Air Museum, Yorkshire.
- XZ389 Jaguar GR1 at the Ulster Aviation Society, Long Kesh. Northern Ireland.
- Unidentified Jaguar at Delta Force Paintball Birmingham, visible from M42

=== United States ===
- XZ396 Jaguar GR3A at the Pima Air and Space Museum in Tucson, Arizona.

== Specifications (Jaguar A / S) ==
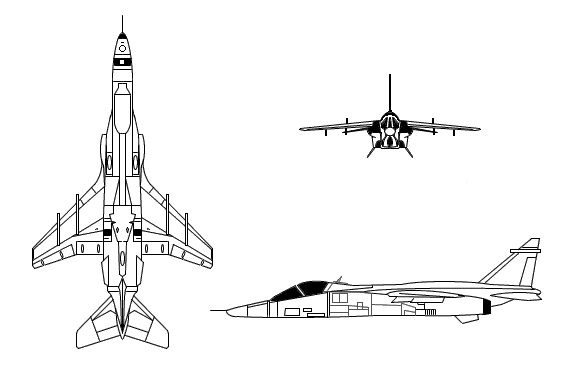
Orthographically projected diagram of the SEPECAT Jaguar.

Data from Jane's All The World's Aircraft 1980–81

General characteristics

- Crew: 1 (A and S); 2 (B and E)
- Length: 16.83 m (55 ft 3 in) (Note: (A and S) with minor variations dependent on nose configuration; 17.53 m (57.5 ft) (B and E) with minor variations dependent on nose probe type (AAR or pitot))
- Wingspan: 8.69 m (28 ft 6 in)
- Height: 4.89 m (16 ft 1 in)
- Wing area: 24.18 m^{2} (260.3 sq ft)
- Aspect ratio: 3.12
- Empty weight: 7,000 kg (15,432 lb) typical, (dependent on variant and role)
- Gross weight: 10,954 kg (24,149 lb) full internal fuel and 120 rpg
- Max takeoff weight: 15,700 kg (34,613 lb) with external stores
- Fuel capacity: 4,200 L (1,100 US gal; 920 imp gal) internal, with provision for three 1,200 L (320 US gal; 260 imp gal) drop tanks on inboard and centreline pylons
- Powerplant: 2 × Rolls-Royce Turbomeca Adour Mk.102 afterburning turbofan engines, 22.75 kN (5,110 lbf) thrust each dry, 32.5 kN (7,300 lbf) with afterburner

Performance

- Maximum speed: 1,350 km/h (840 mph, 730 kn) Mach 1.1 at sea level

1,699 km/h (1,056 mph; 917 kn) Mach 1.6 at 11,000 m (36,000 ft)

- Combat range: 815 km (506 mi, 440 nmi) hi-lo-hi (internal fuel)

575 km (357 mi; 310 nmi) lo-lo-lo (internal fuel) (Note: With external fuel: 1,408 km (875 mi; 760 nmi) hi-lo-hi and 908 km (564 mi; 490 nmi) lo-lo-lo)

- Ferry range: 1,902 km (1,182 mi, 1,027 nmi) with full internal and external tanks
- Service ceiling: 14,000 m (46,000 ft)
- g limits: +8.6 (ultimate load +12)
- Time to altitude: 9,145 m (30,003 ft) in 1 minute 30 seconds
- Wing loading: 649.3 kg/m^{2} (133.0 lb/sq ft) maximum
- Thrust/weight: Adour Mk.102: 0.422 (Note: Adour Mk.104: 0.464, Adour Mk.811: 0.486)
- Take-off run: 580 m (1,900 ft) with typical tactical load
- Take-off run to 15 m (49 ft): 940 m (3,080 ft) with typical tactical load
- Landing run from 15 m (49 ft): 785 m (2,575 ft) with typical tactical load
- Landing run: 470 m (1,540 ft) with typical tactical load
- Landing speed: 213 km/h (132 mph; 115 kn)

Armament

- Guns: 2× 30 mm (1.181 in) calibre DEFA cannon with up to 150 rounds/gun
- Hardpoints: 7 (4× under-wing, 2× over-wing and 1× centreline) with a capacity of 10,000 lb (4,500 kg), with provisions to carry combinations of:
  - Rockets: 8× Matra rocket pods with 18× SNEB 68 mm rockets each
  - Missiles:
    - Air-to-air missiles:
      - 2× AIM-9 Sidewinder on outboard pylons (French Air and Space Force) or 2× AIM-9 Sidewinder on overwing pylons
      - 2× R.550 Magic on outboard pylons (French Air and Space Force)
      - ASRAAM (Indian Air Force)
      - Astra (Indian Air Force)
    - Air-to-surface missiles:
      - AS-30L (French Air and Space Force)
      - Rampage (Indian Air Force)
    - Anti-ship missiles:
      - Harpoon (Indian Air Force)
      - Sea Eagle (Indian Air Force)
    - Anti-radiation missiles:
      - AS.37 Martel
      - Rudram-1 (Indian Air Force)
    - Precision-guided munition:
      - Smart Anti-Airfield Weapon (Indian Air Force)
  - Bombs: various unguided or laser-guided bombs
    - Nuclear bombs:
      - 2× WE177A nuclear bombs
      - 1× AN-52 nuclear bomb (French Air and Space Force)
  - Other: external drop tanks for extended range/loitering time.

Avionics

- EL/M-2052 AESA radar, as a part of Indian Air Force's DARIN III upgrade program.
- ATLIS II laser/electro-optical targeting pod
- ECM protection pod
- Reconnaissance pod

== See also ==
Aircraft of comparable role, configuration, and era

- Dassault/Dornier Alpha Jet
- Fiat G.91Y
- IAR-93 Vultur
- LTV A-7 Corsair II
- Mitsubishi F-1
- Nanchang Q-5
- Soko J-22 Orao
- Sukhoi Su-17
- Xian JH-7

Related lists

- List of aircraft of the Royal Air Force
