= Lancaster House Treaties =

2010 treaties between United Kingdom and France

The Lancaster House Treaties
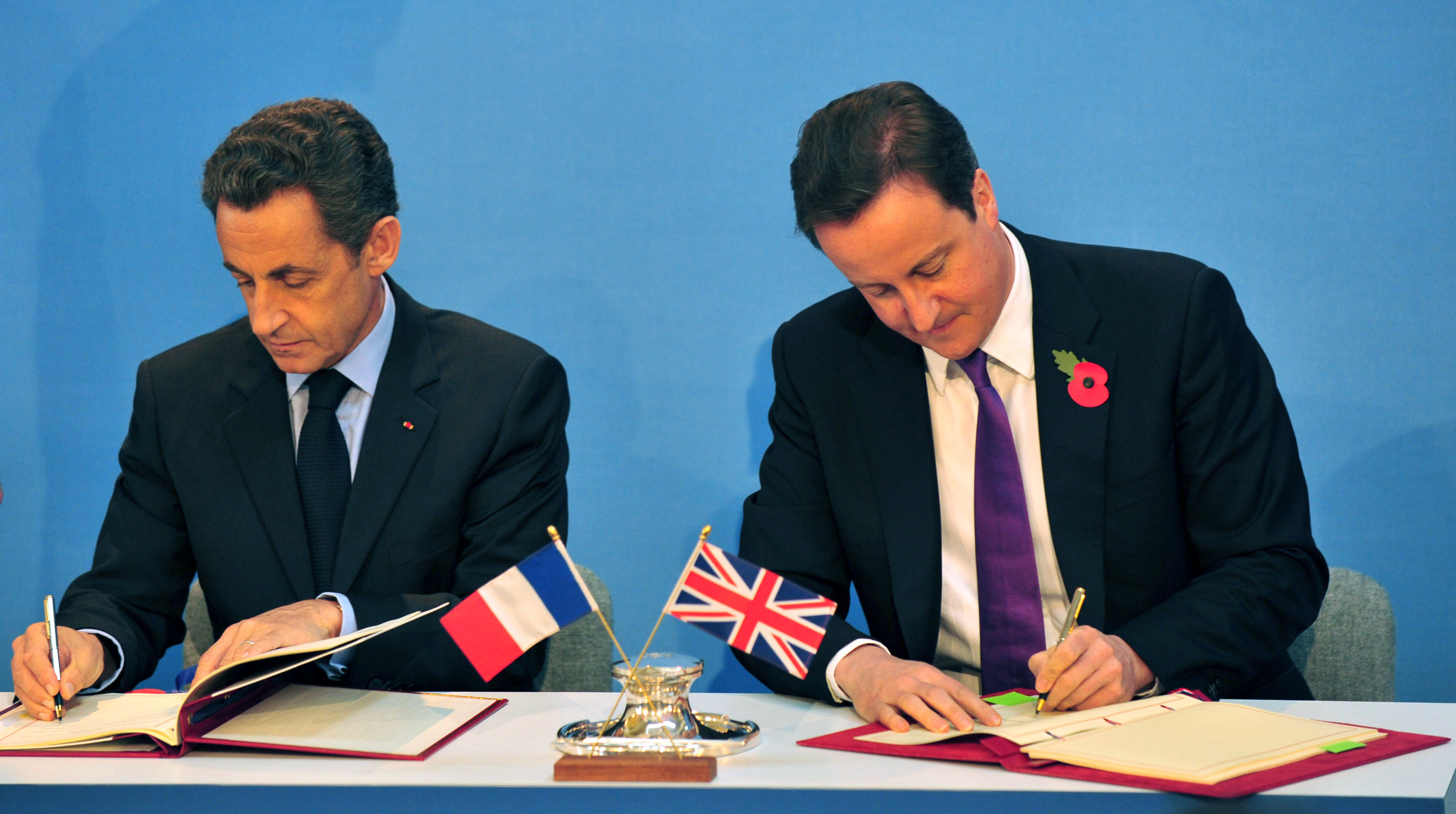
- Cameron and Sarkozy sign the Defence and Security Co-operation Treaty during the UK-France summit at London.
- Type: Defence treaties
- Signed: 2 November 2010
- Location: Lancaster House, London, England
- Signatories: Nicolas Sarkozy; David Cameron
- Parties: France; United Kingdom

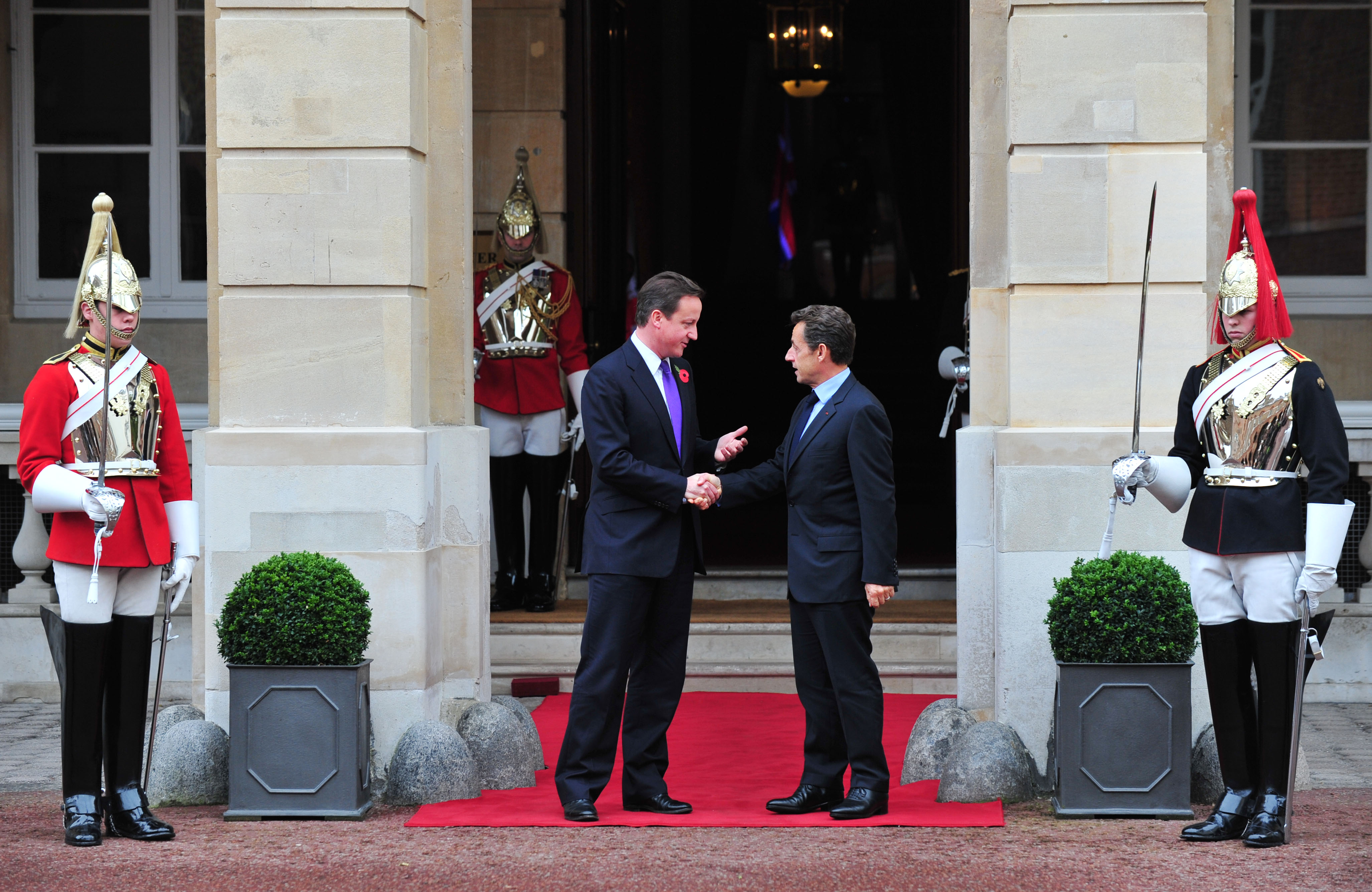
David Cameron greets Nicolas Sarkozy at Lancaster House, London, for the UK-France Summit.

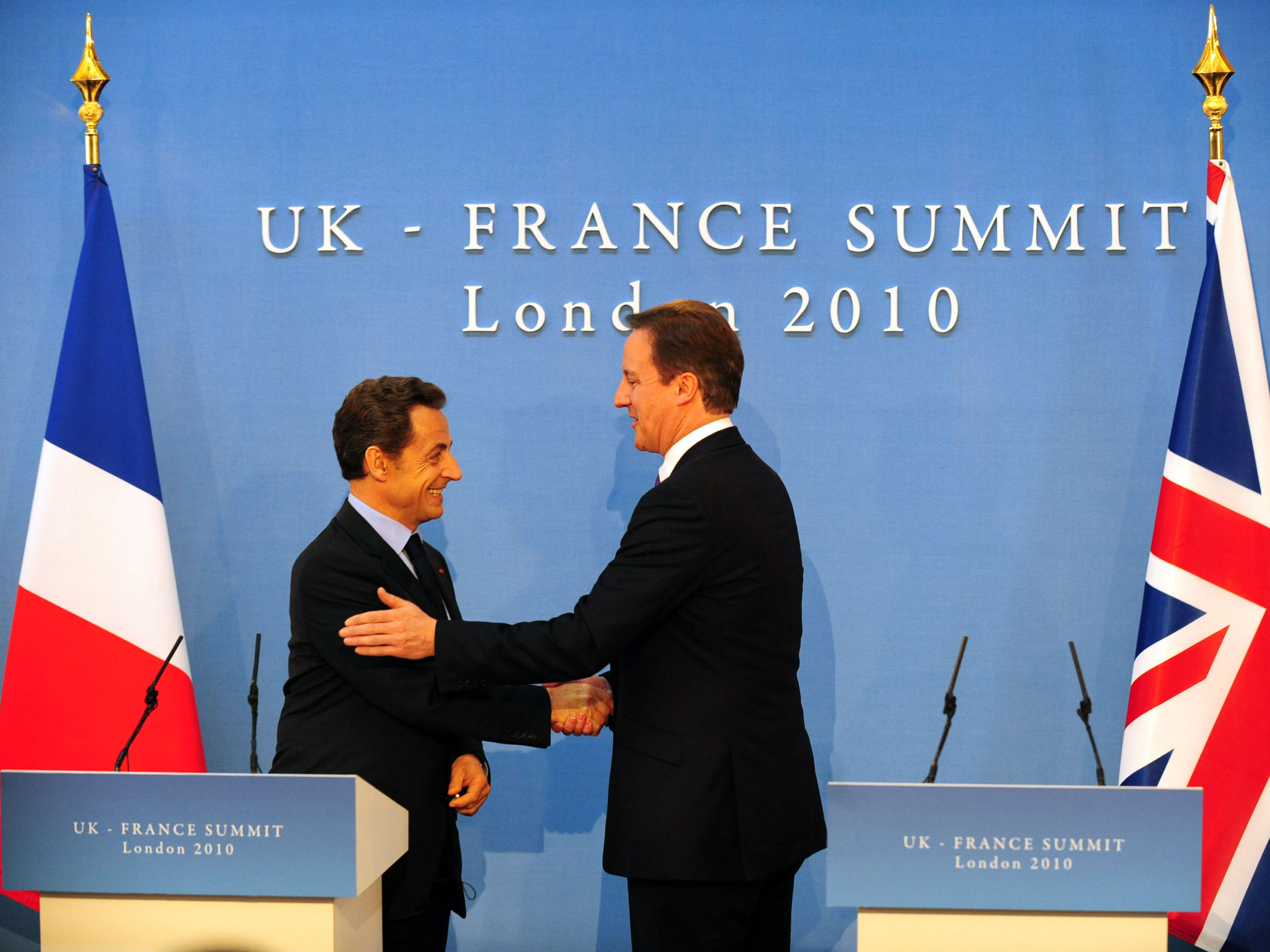
Sarkozy and Cameron address the media after signing the Defence and Security Co-operation Treaty.

The Lancaster House Treaties (French: Traités de Londres, lit. 'Treaties of London') of 2010 are two treaties between the United Kingdom and France for defence and security cooperation. They were signed at 10 Downing Street on 2 November 2010 by British prime minister David Cameron and French President Nicolas Sarkozy. The two treaties collectively are sometimes referred to as the Lancaster House Agreement.

The two treaties were 'modernised' on 10 July 2025 on the occasion of their fifteeneth anniversary at the 37th Franco-British Summit, held in London, by President Emmanuel Macron and Prime Minister Keir Starmer. This was done to ensure the treaties matched both the changes in warfare and technology, as well as the European security situation following the 2022 Russian invasion of Ukraine.

== Downing Street Declaration ==
The 2 November 2010 Downing Street declaration by President Sarkozy and Prime Minister Cameron. The elements of this declaration are as follows.

- Defence and Security Cooperation Treaty: The purpose of this is to develop co-operation between British and French armed forces, the sharing and pooling of materials and equipment including through mutual interdependence, the building of joint facilities, mutual access to each other's defence markets, and industrial and technological co-operation.
- Nuclear Stockpile Stewardship: Collaboration on the technology associated with nuclear stockpile stewardship in support of both countries' independent nuclear deterrent capabilities, including a new joint facility at Valduc in France that will model performance of nuclear warheads and materials to ensure long-term viability, security and safety – this will be supported by a joint Technology Development Centre at Aldermaston in the UK.
- Operational Matters: It was also decided to sign a letter of intent, creating a new framework for exchanges between UK and French armed forces on operational matters.
- Industry and Armaments: It was decided to direct the UK-France High Level Working Group to strengthen its work on industrial and armament cooperation.

== Operations and training ==
=== Combined Joint Expeditionary Force ===
It was decided to develop a Combined Joint Expeditionary Force (CJEF) suitable for a wide range of scenarios, up to and including high intensity operations. It will involve all three armed Services: there will be a land component composed of formations at national brigade level, maritime and air components with their associated Headquarters, and logistics and support functions. It will not involve standing forces but will be available at notice for bilateral, NATO, European Union, United Nations or other operations. It will begin with combined air and land exercises during 2011 and will develop the concept before the next UK-France Summit and progress towards full capability in subsequent years. The Force is intended to stimulate greater interoperability and coherence in military doctrine, training and equipment requirements.

=== Aircraft carriers ===
The UK had earlier announced its decision to install catapults and arresting gear on its new aircraft carriers (then under construction) which French aircraft would be capable of using, creating opportunities for UK and French aircraft to operate off carriers from both countries. Building primarily on maritime task group co-operation around the French carrier Charles de Gaulle, the UK and France would have aimed to have, by the early 2020s, the ability to deploy a UK-French integrated carrier strike group incorporating assets owned by both countries. This was to ensure that the Royal Navy and the French Navy would work in the closest co-ordination. The decision to install the catapults and arresting gear was later reversed.

== Equipment and capabilities ==
They agreed cooperation in the following areas.

=== A400M support and training ===
The two governments are committed to develop a joint support plan for future A400Ms ordered by the two countries. The aim is to reduce costs, improve aircraft availability and develop future cooperation in the fields of maintenance, logistics and training. In 2014, the Defense Equipment and Support (DE&S) and the Direction Générale de l’Armement (DGA), through OCCAR (Organisation Conjointe de Coopération en matière d'Armement / Organisation for Joint Armament Co-operation), awarded Airbus with a Maintenance, Repair and Overhaul (MRO) contract.

=== Submarine technologies and systems ===
The two countries plan to develop jointly some of the equipment and technologies for the next generation of nuclear submarines.

=== Maritime mine countermeasures ===
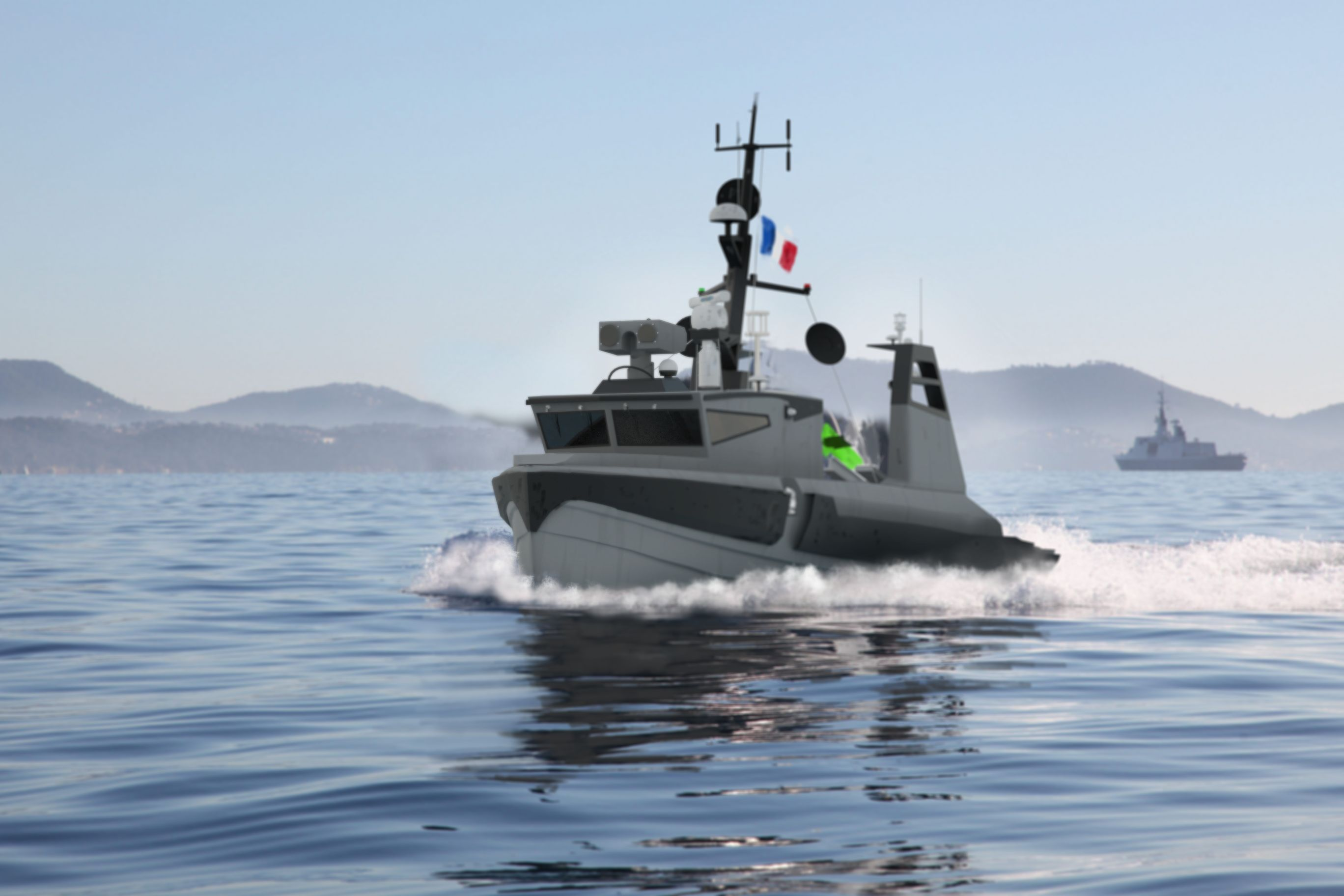
Computer-generated image of a MMCM (Maritime Mine Counter Measures) minesweeping drone.

The Franco-British mine warfare program, called MMCM (Maritime Mine Counter Measures), was notified in March 2015 by the DE&S and the DGA. It associates BAE Systems and Thales as well as their subcontractors, including ECA, ASV, Saab and Kongsberg. “It will provide a demonstration of systems and equipment to defeat sea-mines using remotely-operated, unmanned marine vehicles and sensors."

The contract provides for the delivery of a system to each of the navies in April 2020.

=== Satellite communications ===
The aim of this collaboration is to complete a joint concept study in 2011 for the next satellites to enter into service between 2018 and 2022.

=== Air to air refuelling and passenger air transport ===
The British government will investigate the potential to use spare capacity that may be available in the UK's Future Strategic Tanker Aircraft (FSTA) programme to meet the needs of France for air to air refuelling and military air transport.

=== Unmanned air systems ===
The two countries pledge to work together to develop a new generation of Medium Altitude Long Endurance (MALE) surveillance drones.

In 2011, BAE Systems and Dassault Aviation signed an MoU aimed at developing a MALE drone called Telemos. The industrial sharing defined by the two manufacturers gave BAE the project management on the aircraft and its integration while Dassault was responsible for the systems. This project was abandoned in 2013.

On 16 February 2012, France and the United Kingdom signed a letter of intent relating to the joint study of military drones, thus launching the FCAS-DP project (future combat air system - demonstration program) which should make it possible to develop a combat drone or UCAV (unmanned combat aerial vehicle). The manufacturers involved are BAE and Dassault as aircraft manufacturers, Rolls-Royce and Snecma for the engine and Selex and Thales for sensors and communications. A new step was taken in 2014 with the signing of a declaration of intent to launch a feasibility phase lasting 24 months. At the end of the latter, the British finally decided not to follow up on this project.

=== A 10-year strategic plan for the British and French Complex Weapons sector ===
London and Paris pledged to support the establishment of a "single European industrial prime contractor" to streamline the missile sector. The two countries agreed to "mutual dependence" while preserving their respective strategic autonomy. The aim was to reduce development costs and optimise investments: the approach aimed at reducing costs by around 30% at the European missile company MBDA.

In March 2017, the French and British defence procurement ministers signed an agreement to launch a three-year concept phase for the development of a new long-range missile intended for the Navy and Air Force of each country. The two nations pledged to contribute a total of 100 million euros to complete the study as well as to pool their technologies and test facilities. Called FC/ASW (Future Cruise/Anti-Ship Weapon), the programme should enable the replacement of the Harpoon, Exocet, Storm Shadow and SCALP missiles.

In September 2015, the two nation's defence ministers signed an agreement to implement Centers of Excellence in the missile sector. These technical centers were designed to limit technological redundancies by distributing technical skills and expertise between the two parties. The technologies developed in this context are then integrated into the various MBDA programmes. This makes it possible to rationalise development costs thanks to industrial integration and to guarantee the sustainability of industrial capabilities on both sides of the Channel while linking the two nations through "progressive and controlled interdependence".

The agreement was ratified by the French and British parliaments in October 2016 and provides for the opening of eight Centers of Excellence.

=== Research and technology ===
- To continue with their significant R&T co-operation, devoting an annual budget of €50m each to shared research and development, with the aim of increasing this where possible.
- To focus on a set of 10 priority areas that will include time critical research support to satellite communications, unmanned systems, naval systems and complex weapons. including new areas of critical industrial importance such as sensors, electronic warfare technologies, and materials, as well as novel areas such as simulation and a jointly funded PhD programme.

=== Cyber security ===
France and the UK agreed a framework which will govern their enhanced co-operation in this area, leading to strengthened individual and common resilience.

=== Data exchange ===
The two governments are committed to facilitating the sharing of classified data relating to technologies developed jointly as well as certain operations at the operational level. These exchanges must not, however, be against national security.

=== Lancaster House 2.0 ===
At the UK-France Summit of July 2025, the two governments announced an update framework for bilateral defense corporation, informally referred to as "Lancaster house 2.0". The new agreement builds on the original Lancaster House Treaties of 2010 and introduces several structural changes. The most notable is the creation of the Combined Joint Force (CJF) which replaces the formed Combined Joint Expeditionary Force (CJEF) the CJF is designed to enhance operational flexibility, interoperability and rapid deployment capabilities of both armed forces. In addition of the CJF, to framework expand Franco-British collaboration to new domains such as space and cyber defense, while also reinforcing industrial cooperation in the development of complex weapon system.

== Counter-terrorism ==
To develop co-operation in the following areas:

- The early detection of terrorist activities and terrorist recruitment.
- The sharing of information on changes in the national threat level.
- The prevention of terrorism through nuclear, radiological, biological, chemical and explosive devices, including through the Cyclamen programme for screening traffic passing through the Channel Tunnel.
- The protection of our populations and critical infrastructure.
- The security of commercial aviation.
- Support in building the capacity of countries outside Europe for the fight against terrorism.

== International security ==
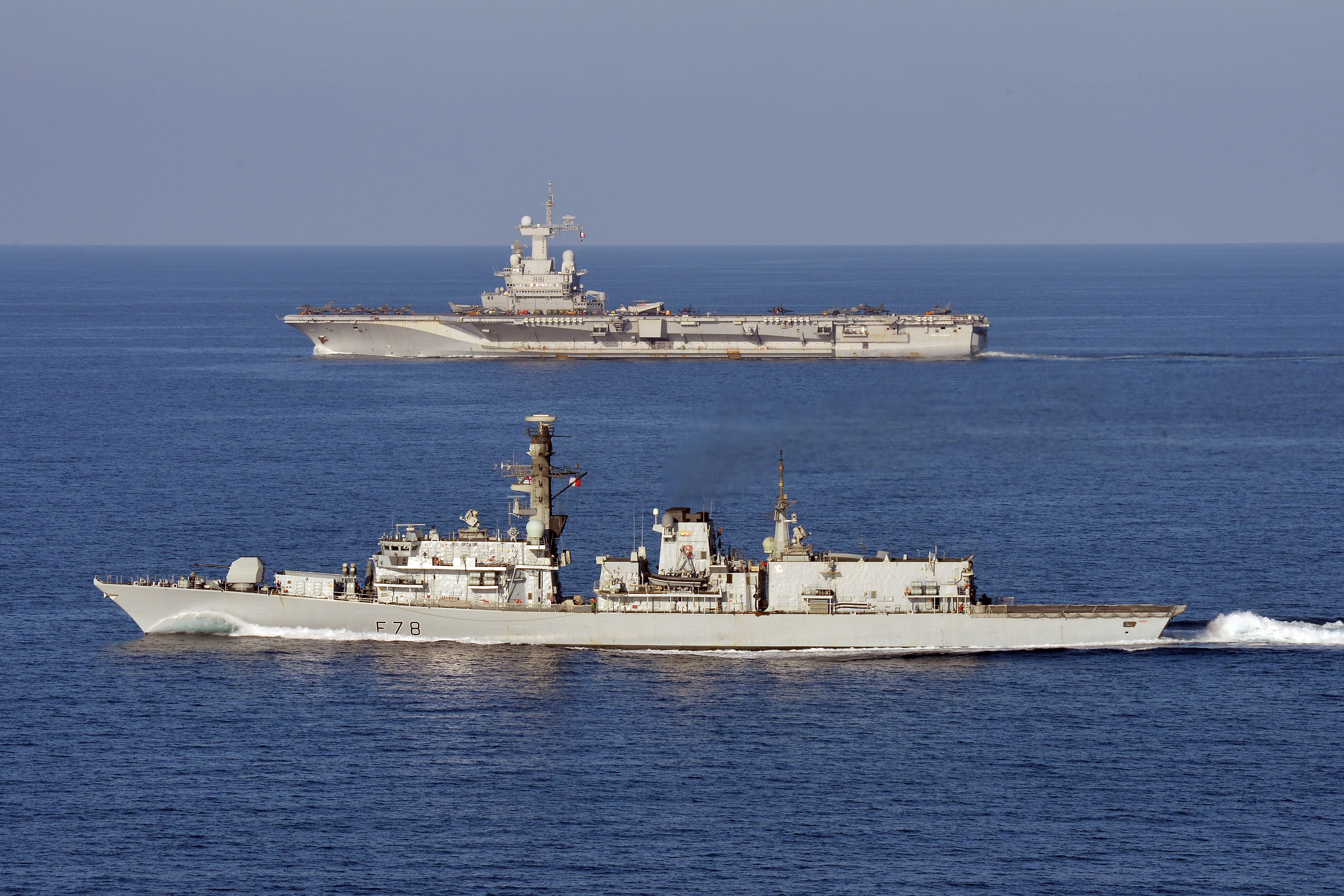
HMS Kent (foreground) collaborating with the French carrier Charles de Gaulle off Djibouti

France and UK agreed that they would pursue closer co-operation across the board between NATO and the EU, and a lasting partnership between NATO and Russia based on practical co-operation and reciprocity.

== 34th Franco-British Summit ==
A follow-up meeting occurred on 3 March 2016, with further pledges on counter terrorism, military defence, civil nuclear work and migration.

== 37th Franco-British Summit and fifteenth anniversary modernisation ==
The 37th Franco-British Summit, held in London over 8-10 July 2025, saw a further refresh of the Treaties. For the fifteenth anniversary of the original signing French President Emmanuel Macron and British Prime Minister Keir Starmer released a declaration on modernising the treaties to 'reboot, modernise and build upon our bilateral defence and security relationship, including under the Lancaster House Treaties, in order to effect a generational shift in both our bilateral cooperation and our joint contribution to the defence of Europe'.

The modernisation consisted of, a strengthened nuclear coordination agreement, the rebranding of the Combined Expeditionary Force (CJEF) as the Combined Joint Force (CJF), a new 'entente industrielle' focused on complex weapons collaboration, new cooperation in every domain including Space and Cyber, as well as enhanced communication and personnel exchange.

== Relationship to European Union Defence Policy ==
Several lines of the treaties allude to the European Union's Common Security and Defence Policy. Through the treaties, the parties agree that they are "reaffirming their commitment to supporting the role of the EU's Common Security and Defence Policy". The parties agree to deploy together in theatres agreed under the auspices of EU Common Defence and Security Policy. The parties also agree that the treaties "ensure their support for action in the European Union under the Common Security and Defence Policy". However the treaties are bilateral between the UK and France and do not have a formal link with the European Union's Common Security and Defence Policy. Although the treaties mention close defence industrial cooperation, they do not directly mention the European Defence Agency or EU defence industrial programmes and directives which are included under the auspices of the EU's Common Security and Defence Policy because many of these were not initiated until after the treaties were signed. For example, the treaties do not make reference to the Lisbon Treaty’s Permanent Structured Cooperation programme which was not instituted until 2017.

== See also ==
- Entente frugale
- Eurocorps
- Franco-German Brigade
- NATO
