= Entente =

Entente, meaning a diplomatic "understanding", may refer to a number of agreements:

== History ==
- Entente (alliance), a type of treaty or military alliance where the signatories promise to consult each other or to cooperate with each other in case of a crisis or military action
- Entente Cordiale (1904) between France and the United Kingdom
- Anglo-Russian Entente (1907) between the United Kingdom and Russia
- Triple Entente, an informal understanding between the Russian Empire, the French Third Republic and the United Kingdom of Great Britain and Ireland, built upon the Franco-Russian Alliance (1894), the Entente Cordiale (1904), and the Anglo-Russian Entente (1907)
  - Allies of World War I, sometimes referred to as "The Entente", "The Entente Powers", or "The Entente Forces"
- Little Entente (1920–1938), between Czechoslovakia, Romania, and the Kingdom of Yugoslavia
- Balkan Entente (1934–1938), between Greece, Turkey, Romania and Yugoslavia
- Baltic Entente (1934–1939), between Lithuania, Latvia, and Estonia
- Conseil de l'Entente (1959), between Côte d'Ivoire, Burkina Faso, Benin, Niger, and (in 1966) Togo
- Entente frugale (beginning 2010), cooperation between the British and French governments

== Other ==
- Entente Florale Europe, an international horticultural competition
- International Entente Against the Third International, an international anticommunist organisation founded in 1924
- International Entente of Radical and Similar Democratic Parties, a political international existed in 1923–1938
- The Entente: Battlefields WW1, a 2004 video game

== See also ==
- Détente
- L'Entente (disambiguation)
