= Talaria =

Symbol of the Roman god Mercury

A 19th-century engraving of talaria.

The Talaria of Mercury (Latin: tālāria) or The Winged Sandals of Hermes (Ancient Greek: πτηνοπέδῑλος, ptēnopédilos or πτερόεντα πέδιλα, pteróenta pédila) are winged sandals, a symbol of the Greek messenger god Hermes (Roman equivalent Mercury). They were said to be made by the god Hephaestus of imperishable gold and they flew the god as swift as any bird.

== Etymology ==
The Latin noun tālāria is the neuter plural of the adjective tālāris, meaning 'of the ankle'. It is unclear how the Romans came to use tālāria to refer to winged sandals; they may have done so because the sandals' wings were attached at the ankles.

== Attestations ==
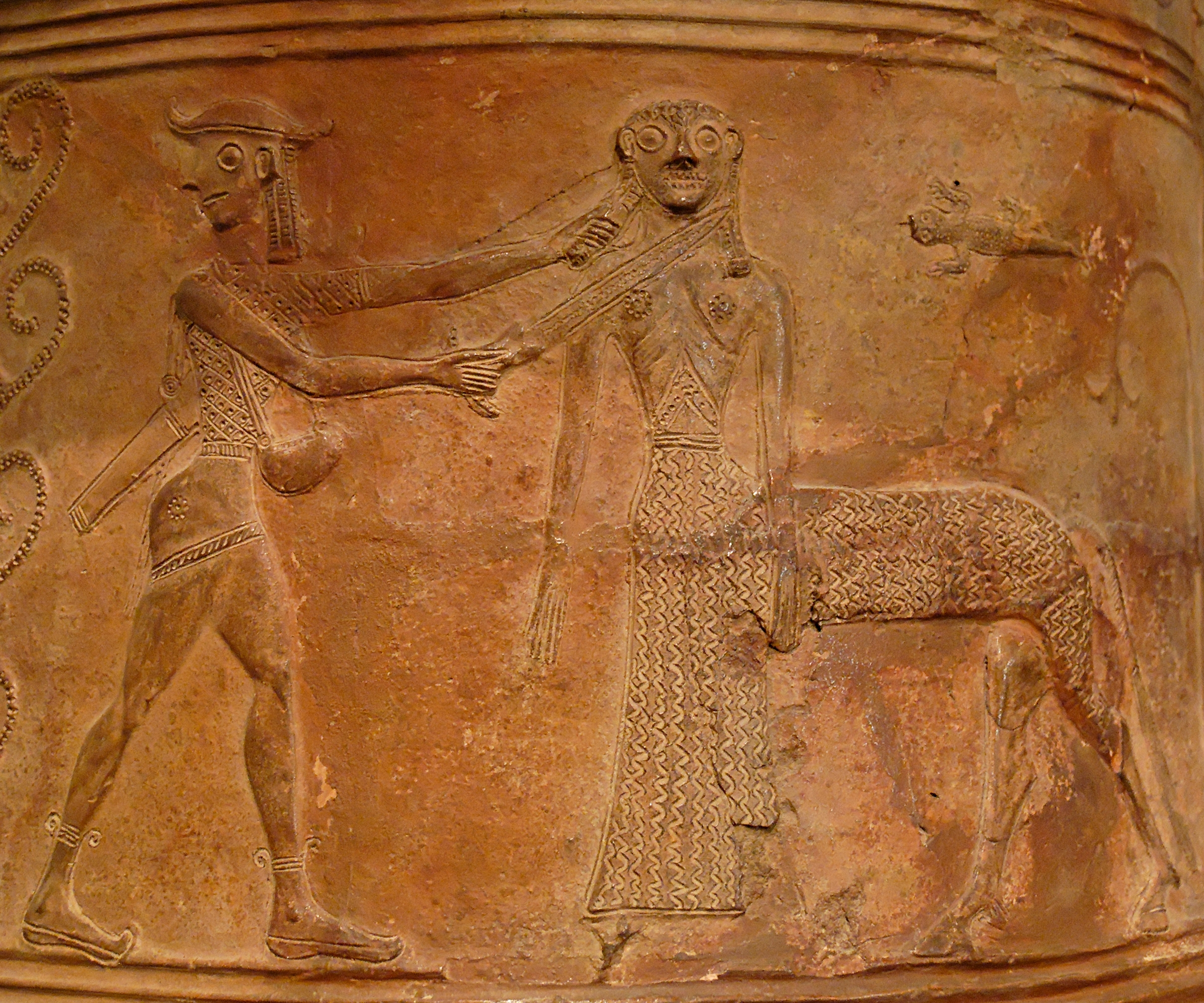
One of the oldest known representations: Perseus, wearing the talaria and carrying the kibisis over his shoulder, turns his head to kill Medusa on this Orientalizing relief pithos, c. 660 BC, Louvre.

In ancient Greek literature, the sandals of Hermes are first of all mentioned by Homer (ἀμβρόσια χρύσεια; ambrósia khrýseia, "immortal/divine and of gold"), though not described as "winged".

The description of the sandals being winged first appear in the poem Shield of Heracles (c. 600 – 550 BC), which speaks of πτερόεντα πέδιλα (pteróenta pédila), literally "winged sandals". The Homeric hymn to Hermes from a somewhat later date (520 BC) does not explicitly state the sandals were winged, though they allowed him to leave no footprints while committing his theft of Apollo's cattle.

According to one estimation, it was around 5th century BC when the winged sandals came to be regarded as common (though not indispensable) accoutrements of the god Hermes. One later instance which refers to the sandals being winged is the Orphic Hymn XXVIII to Hermes (c. 2nd/3rd century AD).

Perseus wears Hermes' sandals to help him slay Medusa. According to Aeschylus, Hermes gives them to him directly. In a better-attested version, Perseus must retrieve them from the Graeae, along with the cap of invisibility and the kibisis (sack).

On early Greek vase paintings, Hermes is shown wearing boots with a curved piece attached to the top edge of each one. This feature seems to be a pull strap for the boots rather than a simple or crude depiction of a wing.

During the Hellenistic and Roman periods, Hermes was sometimes depicted with wings fastened directly to his bare ankles.

=== Latin sources ===
The term talaria has been employed by Ovid in the 1st century, and prior to him, in perhaps eight instances by various Latin authors (Cicero, Virgil, etc.). The term is usually construed as "winged sandals", and applied almost exclusively to the footwear worn by the god Hermes/Mercury or the hero Perseus.

==== Medieval interpretation ====
In the case of the talaria worn by the swift runner Atalanta (Ovid, Metamorphoses X.591) some translators in the past steered away from recognizing them as footwear, and chose to regard them as "long robes, reaching to the ankle", starting with Planudes in the 14th century. This interpretation was also endorsed in the 17th century by Nicolaas Heinsius's gloss, and persisted in the 19th century with Lewis and Short's dictionary entry for this particular passage. But there are "insuperable" reasons against this "robes" interpretation, for Ovid clearly states in the foregoing passages that Atalanta had disrobed (Note: Latin: posito velamine) to engage in the foot-race. (Note: However, the reading Atalanta as racing naked (as Anderson insists) is rejected in favor of a more "modest interpretation" by certain translators (F. Bernini 1943, T. Morino 1946), who perceive Atalanta as still clothed (in talaraia), which were seen to have "moved" (Italian: mossa) or were "tossed aside" (Italian: gettata via by her fast-moving feet.)

Also in the medieval Irish versions of the Aeneid (Imtheachta Aeniasa) and the Destruction of Troy (Togail Troí), Mercury wears a "bird covering" or "feather mantle" (Old Irish: encennach, énchendach), which clearly derives from Mercury's talaria, such as described by Virgil. (Note: Whitley Stokes (1881) pointed to the parallel to the fjaðrhamr (feather cloak) of Old Norse texts.)

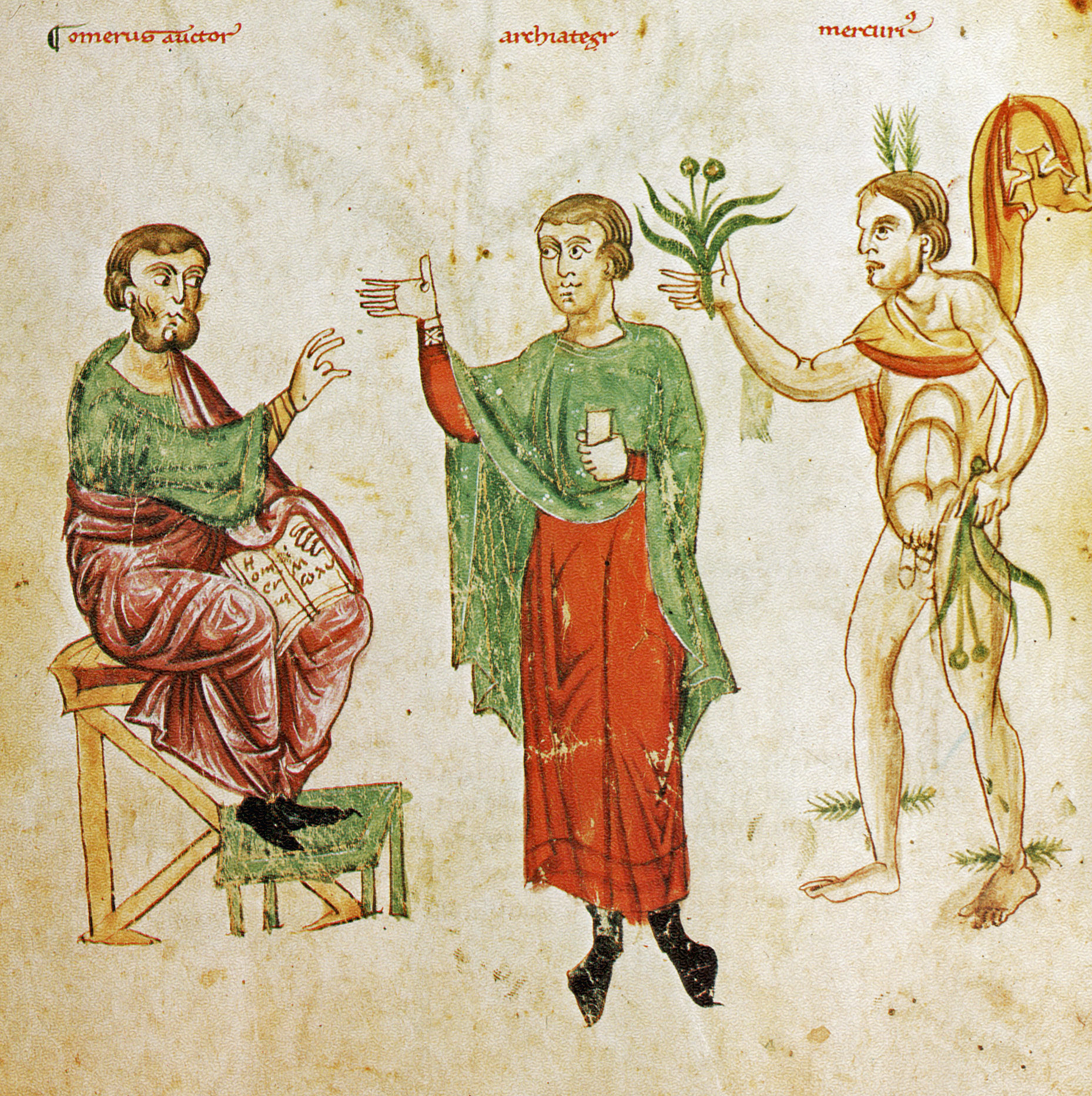
In this 13th century illumination, Mercury (on the right) is mostly naked and has feather-like wings on his head and legs.

Sometimes, it has been interpreted that Hermes feet are winged, rather that the wings being part of his sandals.

== See also ==
- EADS Talarion an unmanned air vehicle named after talaria.
- Hermes also wears a winged petasos, a traveler hat. In other representations he wears a winged helmet.
- Caduceus, the staff of Hermes
- Namor the Sub-Mariner, a comic book character depicted with wings on his ankles.
