= Entente Cordiale =

1904 agreements between the UK and France

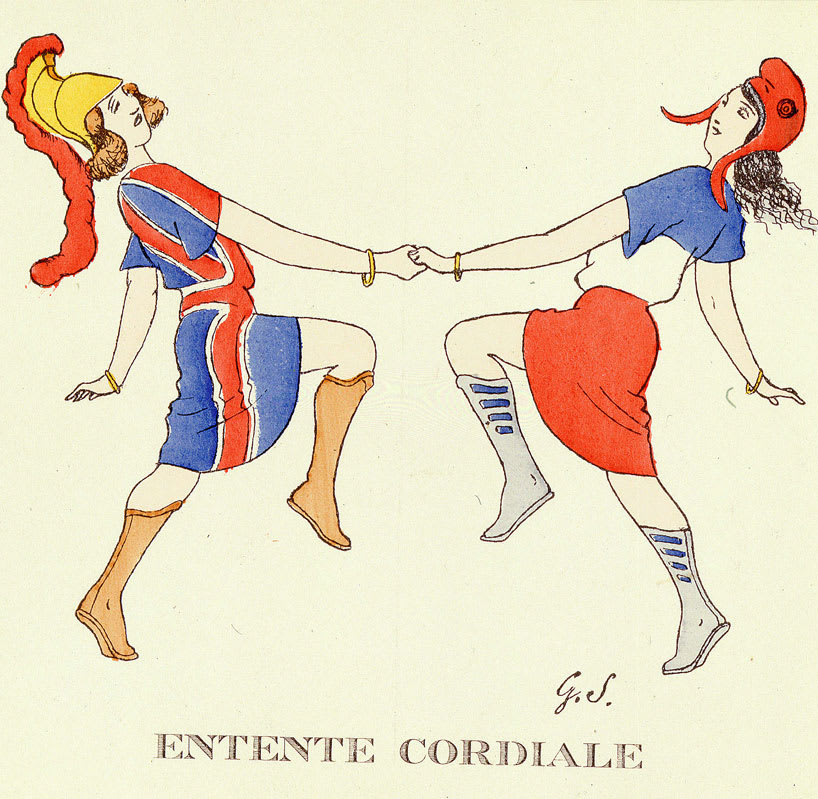
- A 1904 French postcard showing Britannia and Marianne dancing together, symbolizing the newborn cooperation between the two countries
- Signed: 8 April 1904
- Signatories: French Republic; United Kingdom of Great Britain and Ireland
- Languages: English and French

The Entente Cordiale (French pronunciation: [ɑ̃tɑ̃t kɔʁdjal]; lit. 'Cordial Agreement') comprised a series of agreements signed on 8 April 1904 between the United Kingdom and France which saw a significant improvement in Anglo-French relations.

== Background ==
The French term Entente Cordiale (usually translated as 'cordial agreement' or 'cordial understanding') comes from a letter written in 1843 by the British Foreign Secretary Lord Aberdeen to his brother, in which he mentioned "a cordial, good understanding" between the two nations. This was translated into French as Entente Cordiale and used by Louis Philippe I in the French Chamber of Peers that year. When used today the term almost always denotes the second Entente Cordiale, that is to say, the written and partly secret agreement signed in London between the two powers on 8 April 1904.

The agreement was a change for both countries. France had been isolated from the other European powers, in part because of the destruction of the Napoleonic Wars, threat of liberalism and perceived recklessness in the Franco-Prussian War of 1870–71. German Chancellor Otto von Bismarck also managed to estrange France from potential allies, taking advantage of fears France might seek revenge for its defeat in the Franco-Prussian War, reverse its territorial losses and continue to press for the conquest of the Saar and territories in the Ruhr. Britain was maintaining a policy of "splendid isolation" on the European continent, ceasing to be concerned with the balance of power and intervening in continental affairs only when it was considered necessary to protect British interests. The situation for Britain and France changed in the last decade of the 19th century.

The change had its roots in a British loss of confidence after the Second Boer War and a growing fear of the strength of Germany. As early as March 1881, the French statesman Léon Gambetta and the Prince of Wales, Albert Edward, met at the Château de Breteuil to discuss an alliance against Germany.

The Scramble for Africa prevented the countries from coming to terms. A colonial dispute in 1898 between France and Britain came to boiling point in the Sudan with the Fashoda Incident, in which both countries sought to gain control of the Upper Nile river basin. France, however, recognised that she was at a severe disadvantage with Britain and backed down, suffering a diplomatic humiliation. Théophile Delcassé, the newly appointed French foreign minister, nevertheless was keen to gain Britain's friendship in case of any future conflict with Germany.

On the initiative of Colonial Secretary Joseph Chamberlain, there were three rounds of British-German talks between 1898 and 1901. The British decided not to join the Triple Alliance, broke off the negotiations with Berlin, and revived the idea of a British-French alliance.

When the Russo-Japanese War was about to erupt, France and Britain found themselves on the verge of being dragged into the conflict on the side of their respective allies. France was firmly allied with Russia, while the British had recently signed the Anglo-Japanese Alliance. In order to avoid going to war, both powers "shucked off their ancient rivalry" and resolved their differences in Africa, the Americas, Asia, and the Pacific. Toward this end, French foreign minister Théophile Delcassé, and Lord Lansdowne, the British Foreign Secretary, negotiated an agreement on colonial matters, and Lord Lansdowne and Paul Cambon, the French Ambassador to the Court of St James's, signed the resulting convention on 8 April 1904.

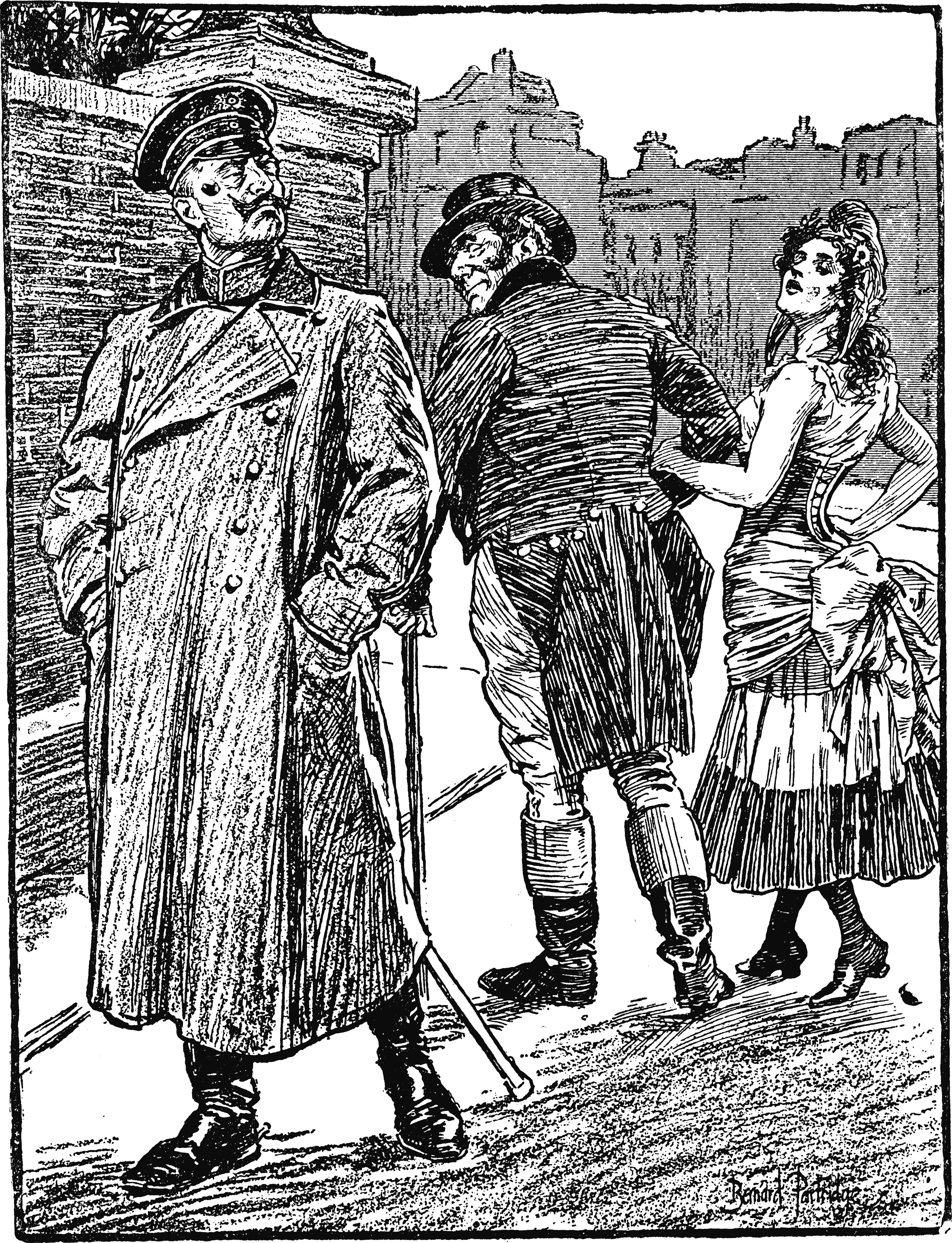
A cartoon on the Entente Cordiale from Punch, with John Bull stalking off with the harlot Marianne (in what is supposed to be a Tricolour dress) and turning his back on the Kaiser, who pretends not to care. The tip of the scabbard of a cavalry sabre protrudes from beneath the Kaiser's army overcoat, implying a potential resort to force.

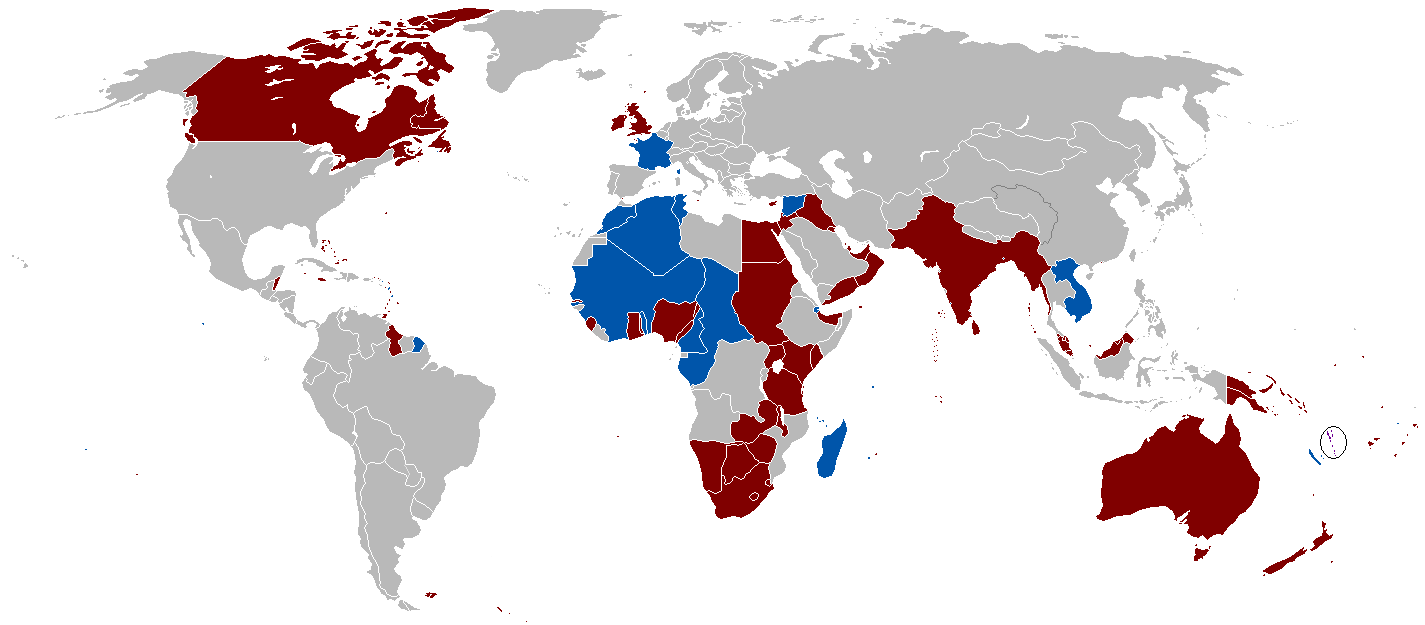
The British and French colonial empires reached their peaks after World War I, a reflection of the power of this agreement.

== Documents signed ==
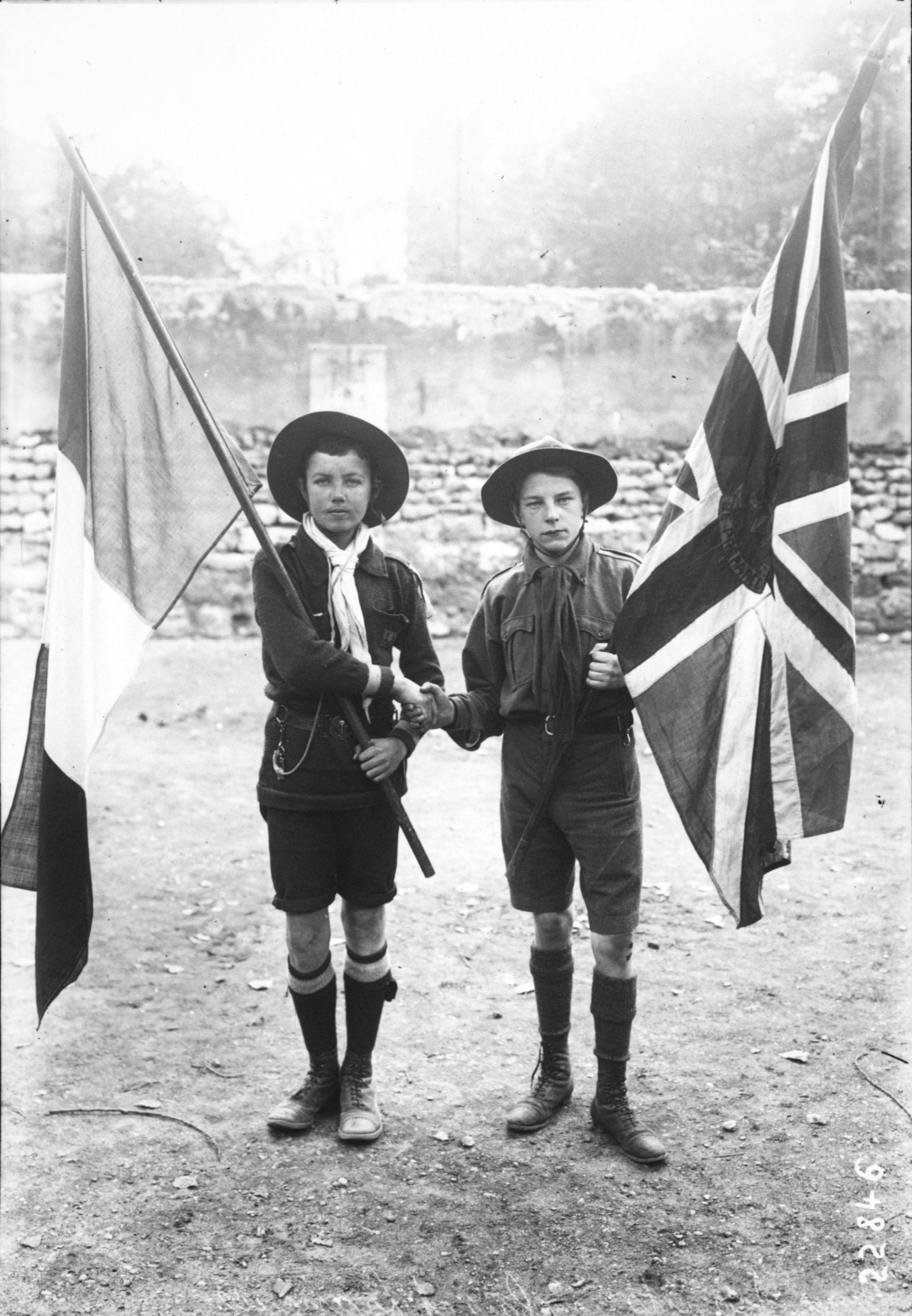
French and British scouts, with their respective national flags, shaking hands. 1912

The Entente was composed of three documents:

- The first and most important document was the Declaration respecting Egypt and Morocco. In return for the French promising not to "obstruct" British actions in Egypt, the British promised to allow the French to "preserve order ... and provide assistance" in Morocco. Free passage through the Suez Canal was guaranteed, finally putting the Convention of Constantinople into force, and the erection of fortifications on part of the Moroccan coast forbidden. The treaty contained a secret annex dealing with the possibility of "changed circumstances" in the administration of either of the two countries.
- The second document dealt with Newfoundland and portions of West and Central Africa. The French gave up their rights (stemming from the Treaty of Utrecht) over the western coast of Newfoundland, known as the French Shore, although they retained the right to fish the coast. In return, the British gave the French the town of Yarbutenda (near the modern border between Senegal and the Gambia) and the Iles de Los (part of modern Guinea). An additional provision dealt with the border between French and British possessions east of the River Niger (present-day Niger and Nigeria).
- The final declaration concerned Siam (Thailand), Madagascar, and the New Hebrides (Vanuatu). In Siam, the British recognised a proposed French sphere of influence to the east of the Menam (Chao Phraya) River basin; in turn, the French recognised a proposed British influence over the territory to the west of the Menam basin. Both parties eventually disclaimed any idea of annexing Siamese territory. The British withdrew their objection to the French introducing a tariff in Madagascar. The parties came to an agreement which would "put an end to the difficulties arising from the lack of jurisdiction over the natives of the New Hebrides".

On the surface, the agreement dealt with issues strictly related to fishing and colonial boundaries. Egypt was recognized as part of Britain's sphere of influence, and Morocco as part of France's. The Entente was not a formal alliance and did not involve close collaboration, nor was it intended to be directed against Germany. However, it paved the way for a stronger relationship between France and Britain in the face of German aggression. It should not be mistaken for the official Anglo-French military alliance, which was only established after the outbreak of World War I in 1914. The main colonial agreement was the recognition that Egypt was fully in the British sphere of influence and likewise Morocco in France's, with the proviso that France's eventual dispositions for Morocco include reasonable allowance for Spain's interests there. At the same time, Britain ceded the Los Islands (off French Guinea) to France, defined the frontier of Nigeria in France's favour, and agreed to French control of the upper Gambia valley; while France renounced its exclusive right to certain fisheries off Newfoundland. Furthermore, French and British proposed zones of influence in Siam (Thailand), which was eventually decided not to be colonised, were outlined, with the eastern territories, adjacent to French Indochina, becoming a proposed French zone, and the western, adjacent to Burmese Tenasserim, a proposed British zone. Arrangements were also made to allay the rivalry between British and French colonists in the New Hebrides.

In long-term perspective, the Entente Cordiale marked the end of almost a thousand years of intermittent conflict between the two states and their predecessors, and replaced the modus vivendi that had existed since the end of the Napoleonic Wars in 1815 with a more formal agreement. The Entente Cordiale represented the culmination of the policy of Théophile Delcassé (France's foreign minister from 1898 to 1905), who believed that a Franco-British understanding would give France some security in Western Europe against any German system of alliances (see Triple Alliance (1882)). Credit for the success of the negotiation of the Entente Cordiale belongs chiefly to Paul Cambon (France's ambassador in London from 1898 to 1920) and to the British Foreign Secretary, Lord Lansdowne. In signing the Entente Cordiale, both powers reduced the virtual isolation into which they each had withdrawn. Britain had no major-power ally apart from Japan (1902). France had only the Franco-Russian Alliance. The agreement threatened Germany, whose policy had long relied on Franco-British antagonism. A German attempt to check the French in Morocco in 1905 (the Tangier Incident, or First Moroccan Crisis), and thus to upset the Entente, served only to strengthen it. Military discussions between the French and the British general staffs were initiated. Franco-British solidarity was confirmed at the Algeciras Conference (1906) and reconfirmed in the Second Moroccan Crisis (1911).

== Aftermath ==
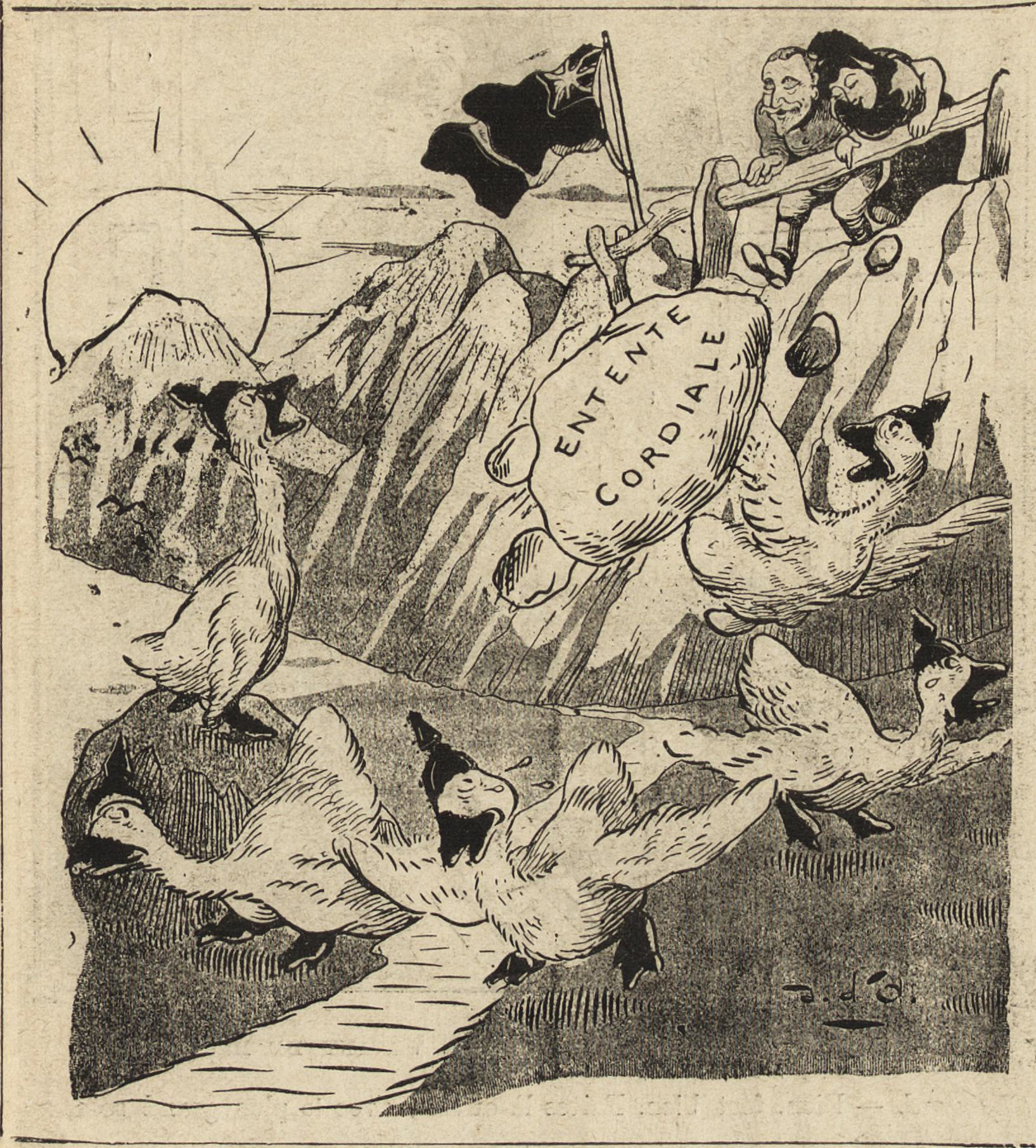
A 1906 French caricature by John Grand-Carteret (1850–1927) depicting King Edward VII of Great Britain and a figure representing France hurling rocks at German ducks — a satirical take on the Entente Cordiale.

It is unclear what exactly the Entente meant to the British Foreign Office. For example, in early 1911, following French press reports contrasting the virility of the Triple Alliance with the moribund state of the Entente, Eyre Crowe minuted: "The fundamental fact of course is that the Entente is not an alliance. For purposes of ultimate emergencies it may be found to have no substance at all. For the Entente is nothing more than a frame of mind, a view of general policy which is shared by the governments of two countries, but which may be, or become, so vague as to lose all content."

Such commentary however proved spurious, for the Triple Alliance collapsed as a result of Italy remaining neutral at the outbreak of World War I, while the Entente endured.

== Commemoration ==
The 100th anniversary of the Entente Cordiale in 2004 was marked by a number of official and unofficial events, including a state visit to France in April by Queen Elizabeth II, and a return visit by President Jacques Chirac in November. British troops (the band of the Royal Marines, the Household Cavalry Mounted Regiment, the Grenadier Guards and the King's Troop, Royal Horse Artillery) also led the Bastille Day parade in Paris for the first time, with the Red Arrows flying overhead.

At both London Waterloo International and Paris Gare du Nord, the flags of United Kingdom and of France were depicted, connected with the words 'Entente cordiale' superimposed on posters. Some French political leaders had complained about the name "Waterloo" for the destination of trains from Paris, because the London terminus is named after the 1815 battle in which a British-led alliance defeated Napoleon's army, and in 1998 French politician Florent Longuepée wrote to British Prime Minister Tony Blair demanding, without success, that the name be changed. However, in November 2007 St Pancras International became the new London terminus for the Eurostar service.

In April 2024, to commemorate the 120th anniversary of the Entente Cordiale, France's Gendarmerie's Garde Républicaine took part in the Changing of the Guard at Buckingham Palace.

=== Entente Cordiale Scholarships ===
The name "Entente Cordiale" is used for the Entente Cordiale Scholarships scheme, a selective Franco-British scholarship scheme which was announced on 30 October 1995 by British Prime Minister John Major and French President Jacques Chirac at an Anglo-French summit in London. It provides funding for British and French students to study for one academic year on the other side of the Channel. The scheme is administered by the French embassy in London for British students, and by the British Council in France and the British embassy in Paris for French students. Funding is provided by the private sector and foundations. The scheme aims to foster mutual understanding and to promote exchanges between the British and French leaders of tomorrow. The programme was initiated by Sir Christopher Mallaby, British ambassador to France between 1993 and 1996.

== See also ==
- Anglo-French Supreme War Council
- France–United Kingdom relations
- Auld Alliance
- British military history
- Causes of World War I
- Diplomatic history of World War I
- Diplomatic history of World War II
- Entente (disambiguation)
- Entente frugale
- Foreign relations of France
- Franco-British Council
- Franco-British Union
- French entry into World War I
- History of the foreign relations of the United Kingdom
- International relations of the Great Powers (1814–1919)

== Sources ==
- Taylor, A. J. P. (1971) [1954]. The struggle for mastery in Europe, 1848-1918. Oxford: Clarendon Press. ISBN 978-0-19-822101-2 – via Internet Archive.
