= BAE Systems/Dassault Telemos =

Unmanned military aircraft

Telemos

General information
- Type: Unmanned Aerial Vehicle (UAV)
- National origin: United Kingdom / France
- Manufacturer: BAE Systems / Dassault
- Status: Cancelled
- Number built: 1

The BAE Systems/Dassault Telemos was an unmanned military aircraft being jointly developed by BAE Systems and Dassault.

== Development ==
The BAE Systems Mantis, which first flew in 2009, was being used as the basis of development. However, flying large UAVs in British airspace was a challenge.

A mockup of Telemos was unveiled at the Paris Air Show at Le Bourget in 2011; by this time BAE and Dassault were cooperating closely, with BAE in the lead role. There was not yet a formal joint requirement for the UAV from the French and British armed forces, but requirements were firming up, including round-the-clock ISTAR capability. Any acquisition would be influenced by EU competition law.

More agreements were planned at the Farnborough Airshow in 2012.

Telemos was expected to be a competitor with the EADS Talarion and American UAVs for a future order by the South Korean government. It could also have been a candidate for the Royal Air Force's "Scavenger" project.

There was an exclusive agreement between BAE Systems and Dassault; they would not cooperate with other partners to develop UAVs. Lacking serious rivals in the UK, this made the BAE/Dassault partnership much more likely to get contracts from the British government. The Telemos was likely to compete with the Talarion for various future European deals.

The Anglo-French Telemos programme was abandoned in July 2012, as the new French socialist government considered cooperating instead with other European partners on the EADS Talarion programme.

== Design ==
Both turboprops and turbofans were considered for the initial design; the mockup shown at Le Bourget had turboprops, which would allow longer endurance at the cost of slower climbing.

== See also ==
- Entente frugale

Aircraft of comparable role, configuration, and era

- Northrop Grumman RQ-4 Global Hawk
- EADS Talarion
- General Atomics MQ-1 Predator
