= EADS Talarion =

Military plane

Talarion
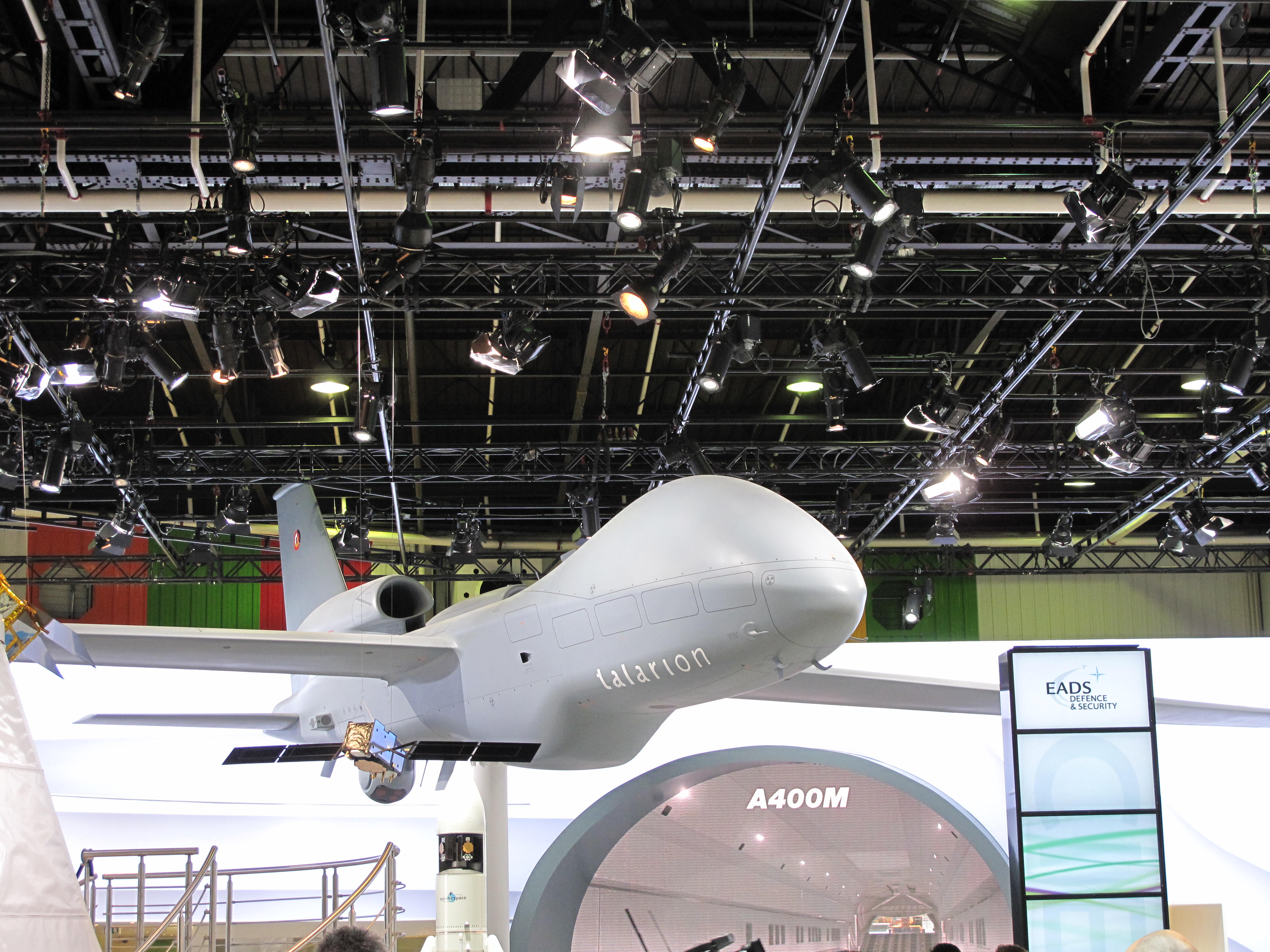
- A mock-up of the EADS Talarion at the Paris Airshow in 2009

General information
- Type: MALE UAV
- Manufacturer: EADS and TAI

History
- Introduction date: 2018 (planned)
- First flight: 2015 (planned)

The EADS Talarion was a twinjet Medium-altitude long-endurance unmanned aerial vehicle (MALE UAV), designed by EADS, to meet future European military needs for aerial reconnaissance, military intelligence, and aerial surveillance. In 2010, EADS had run a preliminary design review. However, in 2015, the Talarion project was discontinued. The source of the name is the Talaria—the winged sandals of the Greek Messenger god Hermes.

== Design and development ==
The development of the Talarion was revealed with a mockup displayed at the 2009 Paris Airshow. This vehicle is a twin jet engined UAV with a wingspan of approximately 28 m. Avionics will be built by Saab.

French parliamentary estimates place Talarion's total programme costs at around EUR 2.9 billion, including around 12–15 systems of three UAVs each.

=== Partnership with Turkish Aerospace Industries ===
In May 2011, a group of Turkish suppliers, led by Turkish Aerospace Industries, joined the project by signing a memorandum of understanding (MoU) with EADS Cassidian for the Talarion UAV programme. Turkey (Turkish Aerospace Industries) has developed and successfully produced MALE UAVs of its own and has subsequently gained significant experience with the development of larger long endurance UAV platforms. A very similar Turkish project, the TAI Anka, made its debut at the 2010 Farnborough Airshow and was scheduled to enter service with the Turkish Air Force in early 2012, but was eventually introduced in 2013.

=== Partnership with Alenia ===
In December 2011, Cassidian and Alenia announced that they would cooperate on MALE UAVs—including the Talarion.

In February 2012, Cassidian announced plans to wind down the Talarion programme, after failing to secure financial backing from potential future buyers; the European market for UAVs now has stronger competition, and budgets are under pressure.

=== Customers ===
In 2010, EADS expressed frustration that the home nations—France, Germany, Spain, and the UK—were not committed to buying the Talarion. However, other countries' armed forces might also buy it; apart from an expected order from Turkey, the Talarion may also be a candidate in a Canadian competition to acquire unmanned surveillance systems, and in January 2013 it was suggested that the South Korean government might consider the Talarion, or the BAE Telemos (now cancelled), as an alternative to the RQ-4 Global Hawk.

The Telemos had also been considered likely to compete with for Talarion for various future European deals.

== Specifications ==
Data from Military Factory

General characteristics

- Crew: none
- Length: 10 m (32 ft 9.7 in)
- Wingspan: 28 m (91 ft 10.3 in)
- Height: 3.45 m (11 ft 3.8 in)
- Empty weight: 3,200 kg (7,055 lb)
- Gross weight: 10,000 kg (22,046 lb)

Performance

- Maximum speed: 630 km/h (391 mph, 340 kn)
- Range: 1,700 km (1,056 mi, 918 nmi)
- Service ceiling: 15,000 m (49,213 ft)

== See also ==
Aircraft of comparable role, configuration, and era

- Denel Dynamics Bateleur
- General Atomics MQ-1 Predator
- IAI Eitan
- Piaggio-Selex P.1HH Hammerhead
- TAI Anka
