= French West Africa =

Colonial federation from 1895 to 1958

French West Africa Afrique-Occidentale française (French)
- 1895–1958
- Flag
- Anthem: La Marseillaise
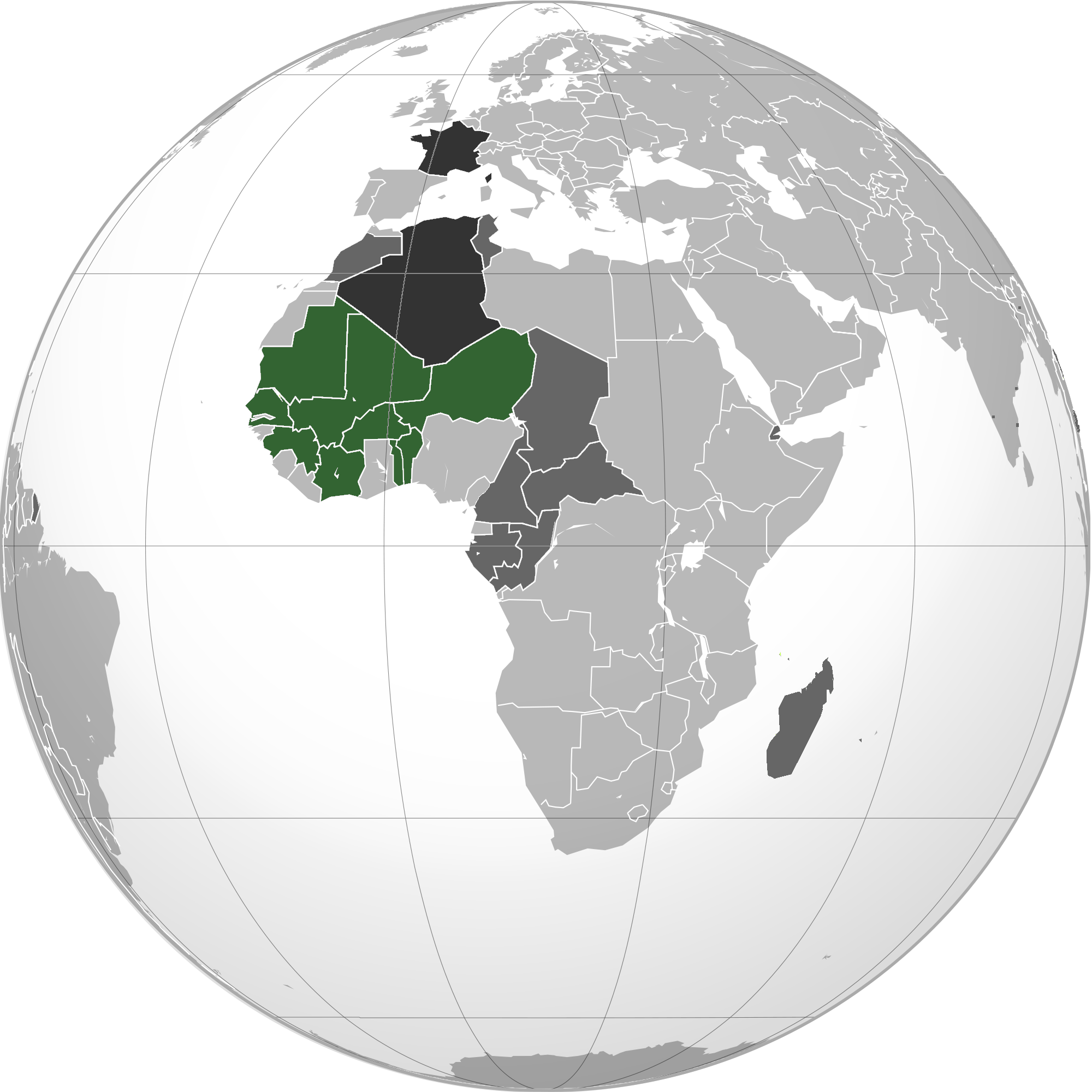
- French West Africa (green) after World War II
- Status: Federation of French colonies
- Capital: Saint Louis (1895–1902); Dakar (1902–1960)
- Common languages: French (official); Arabic; Fula; Songhay; Hausa; Mossi; Mandinka; Wolof; Bambara; Berber languages; Mande languages widely spoken
- Religion: Roman Catholicism, Islam, Animism
- Historical era: New Imperialism
  - Established: 27 October 1895
  - Fifth Republic: 5 October 1958

Area
  - Total: 4,689,000 km^{2} (1,810,000 sq mi)
- Currency: French West African franc
Preceded by
Senegambia and Niger
French Sudan
French Guinea
French Upper Volta
French Dahomey
French Togoland
French Senegal
Succeeded by
French Community
Republic of Dahomey
Guinea
Ivory Coast
Mali Federation
Mauritania
Niger
Republic of Upper Volta
Italian Libya

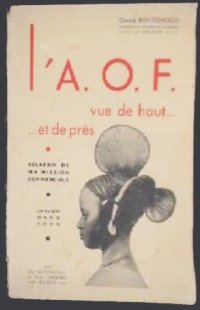
Afrique occidentale française Commercial Relations Report, showing the profile of a Fula woman, January–March 1938

French West Africa (French: Afrique-Occidentale française, AOF) was a federation of eight French colonial territories in West Africa: Mauritania, Senegal, French Sudan (now Mali), French Guinea (now Guinea), Ivory Coast, Upper Volta (now Burkina Faso), Dahomey (now Benin), and Niger. The federation existed from 1895 until 1958. Its capital was Saint-Louis in Senegal until 1902, and then Dakar until the federation's collapse in 1960.

With an area of 4,689,000 km^{2}, French West Africa was eight times the size of Metropolitan France. French Equatorial Africa had an additional area of 2,500,000 km^{2}.

== History ==
Map of the AOF colonies (dark purple) in 1935.

Until after World War II, most West Africans living in the colonies of France were not citizens of France. Rather, they were "French subjects," lacking rights before the law, property ownership rights, rights to travel, dissent, or vote. The exception was the Four Communes of Senegal: those areas had been towns of the tiny Senegal Colony in 1848 when, at the abolition of slavery by the French Second Republic, all residents of France were granted equal political rights. Anyone able to prove they were born in these towns was legally French. They could vote in parliamentary elections, which had been previously dominated by white and mixed-race residents of Senegal.

The Four Communes of Senegal were entitled to elect a deputy to represent them in the French parliament in 1848–1852, 1871–1876, and 1879–1940. In 1914, the first African, Blaise Diagne, was elected as the deputy for Senegal in the French Parliament. In 1916, Diagne pushed a law through the National Assembly (loi Blaise Diagne) granting full citizenship to all residents of the so-called Four Communes. In return, he promised to help recruit millions of Africans to fight in World War I. Thereafter, all black Africans of Dakar, Gorée, Saint-Louis, and Rufisque could vote to send a representative to the French National Assembly.

As the French pursued their part in the scramble for Africa in the 1880s and 1890s, they conquered large inland areas, and at first, ruled them as either a part of the Senegal colony or as independent entities. These conquered areas were usually governed by French Army officers, and dubbed "military territories". In the late 1890s, the French government began to rein in the territorial expansion of its "officers on the ground", and transferred all the territories west of Gabon to a single governor based in Senegal, reporting directly to the Minister of Overseas Affairs. The first governor-general of Senegal was named in 1895, and in 1904, the territories he oversaw were formally named French West Africa (AOF). Gabon would later become the seat of its own federation French Equatorial Africa (AEF), which was to border its western neighbor on the modern boundary between Niger and Chad.

France abolished slavery in French West Africa. This process was gradual. Slavery was formally illegal in all French land including their colonies from 1848, but this law only applied to French citizens in territories officially under French law, which meant that indigenous subjects without French citizenship were not obliged to obey. In French West Africa in 1903-1905, the French authorities started to enforce anti-slavery laws against indigenous slave owners in territories under French control due to pressure from French abolitionists: the laws against slave trade were enforced, and fugitive slaves were not returned to their owners.

In 1905, the French officially abolished slavery in most of French West Africa. From 1906 to 1911, as emancipation progressed, over a million slaves in French West Africa fled from their masters to earlier homes.

After the Fall of France in June 1940 and the two battles of Dakar against the Free French Forces in July and September 1940, authorities in West Africa declared allegiance to the Vichy regime, as did the colony of French Gabon in AEF. Gabon fell to Free France after the Battle of Gabon in November 1940, but West Africa remained under Vichy control until the Allied landings in North Africa in November 1942.

Following World War II, the French government began a process of extending limited political rights in its colonies. In 1945 the French Provisional Government allocated ten seats to French West Africa in the new Constituent Assembly called to write a new French Constitution. Of these five would be elected by citizens (which only in the Four Communes could an African hope to win) and five by African subjects. The elections brought to prominence a new generation of French-educated Africans. On 21 October 1945 six Africans were elected, the Four Communes citizens chose Lamine Guèye, Senegal/Mauritania Léopold Sédar Senghor, Ivory Coast/Upper Volta Félix Houphouët-Boigny, Dahomey/Togo Sourou-Migan Apithy, Soudan-Niger Fily Dabo Sissoko, and Guinea Yacine Diallo. They were all re-elected to the 2nd Constituent Assembly on 2 June 1946.

In 1946, the Loi Lamine Guèye granted some limited citizenship rights to natives of the African colonies. The French Empire was renamed the French Union on 27 October 1946, when the new constitution of the Fourth Republic was established. In late 1946 under this new constitution, each territory was for the first time (excepting the Four Communes) able to elect local representatives, albeit on a limited franchise, to newly established General Councils. These elected bodies had only limited consultative powers, although they did approve local budgets. The Loi Cadre of 23 June 1956 brought universal suffrage to elections held after that date in all French African colonies. The first elections under universal suffrage in French West Africa were the municipal elections of late 1956. On 31 March 1957, under universal suffrage, territorial Assembly elections were held in each of the eight colonies (Togo as a UN trust Territory was at this stage on a different trajectory). The leaders of the winning parties were appointed to the newly instituted positions of Vice-Presidents of the respective Governing Councils — French Colonial Governors remained as Presidents.

The Constitution of the French Fifth Republic of 1958 again changed the structure of the colonies from the French Union to the French Community. Each territory was to become a "Protectorate", with the consultative assembly named a National Assembly. The Governor appointed by the French was renamed the "High Commissioner", and made head of state of each territory. The Assembly would name an African as Head of Government with advisory powers to the Head of State. Legally, the federation ceased to exist after the 1958 French constitutional referendum to approve this French Community. All the colonies except Guinea voted to remain in the new structure. Guineans voted overwhelmingly for independence. In 1960, a further revision of the French constitution, compelled by the failure of the French Indochina War and the tensions in Algeria, allowed members of the French Community to unilaterally change their own constitutions. Senegal and former French Sudan became the Mali Federation (1960–61), while Ivory Coast, Niger, Upper Volta and Dahomey subsequently formed the short-lived Sahel-Benin Union, later the Conseil de l'Entente.

== Territorial changes ==
The administrative structure of French colonial possessions in West Africa, while more homogeneous than neighboring British possessions, was marked by variety and flux. Throughout the history of the AOF, individual colonies and military territories were reorganized numerous times, as was the Government General in Dakar. French Upper Volta was formed and parceled out to neighboring colonies twice. The future states of Mauritania and Niger remained out of the federation until the 1920s and 1940s respectively. They were Military Territories, directly controlled by the French Army. World War II, and the passing of the Loi Cadre (Overseas Reform Act of 1956), both radically restructured the administration of the colonies. French Togoland, seized by France from Germany in World War I, was for most of this period not nominally a colony but a Mandate territory.

== Federal structure ==
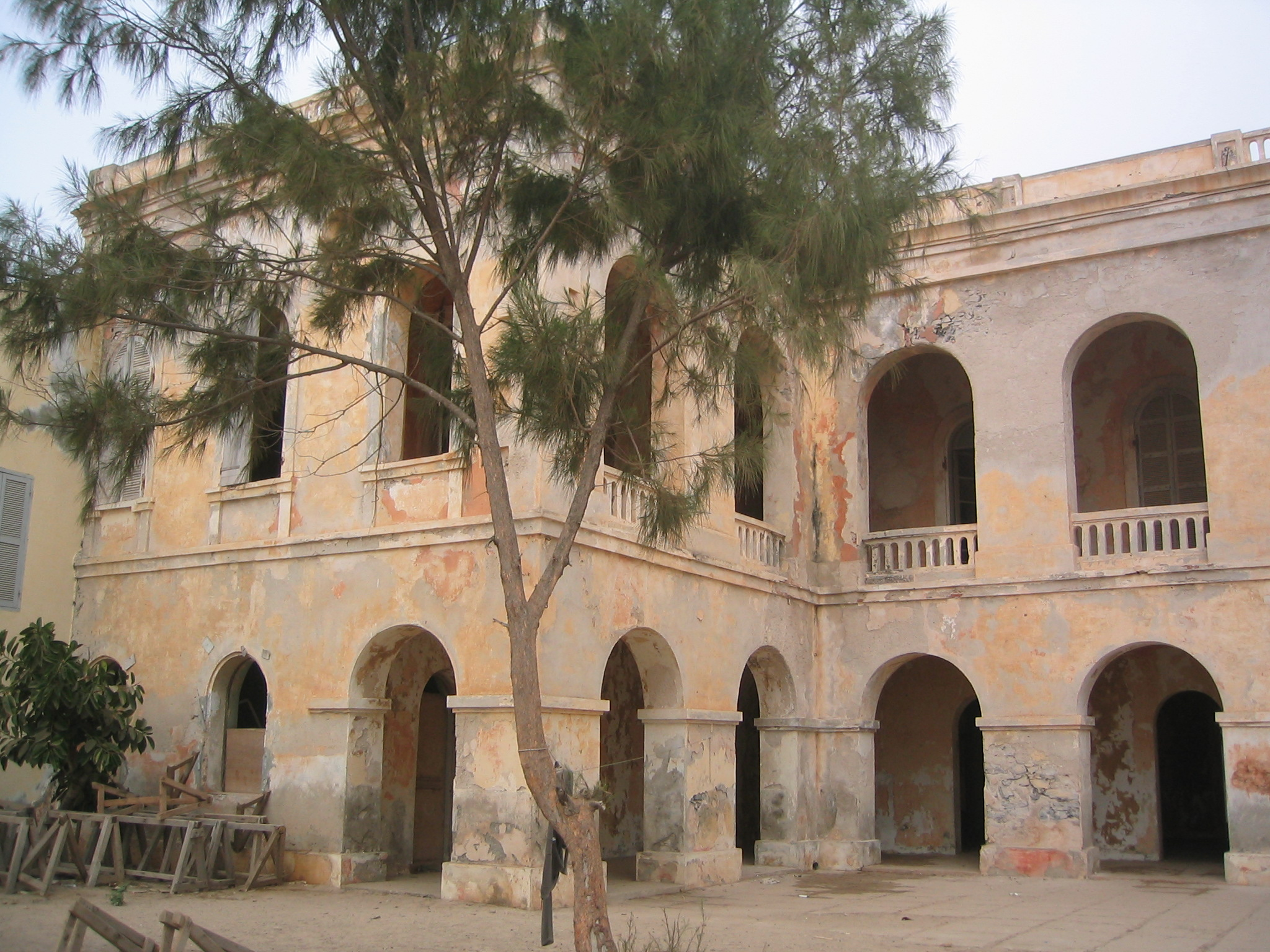
The former Governor's palace on Gorée Island, Dakar, Senegal

In theory, the Governors-General of the AOF reported directly to the Minister of Colonies in Paris, while individual colonies and territories reported only to Dakar. Originally created in 1895 as a union of Senegal, French Sudan, French Guinea and Ivory Coast only, the federation was placed on a permanent footing in 1904. A governor-general was based first in Saint-Louis, then (from 1902) in Dakar (both in Senegal, the oldest French settlement). The AOF subsequently expanded to neighbouring French-ruled territories: Dahomey was added in 1904, after having been put under colonial tutelage in 1892; Mauritania in 1920, and when the territory of Upper Volta was divided from French Sudan by colonial decree in 1921, it automatically also entered the AOF. Between 1934 and 1937, the League of Nations Mandate territory of French Togoland was subsumed into Dahomey, and between its seizure from Germany in World War I and independence it was administered through the AOF. In 1904, both Mauritania and Niger were classed "Military Territories": ruled by the AOF in conjunction with officers of the French Colonial Forces.

== Colonial administration ==
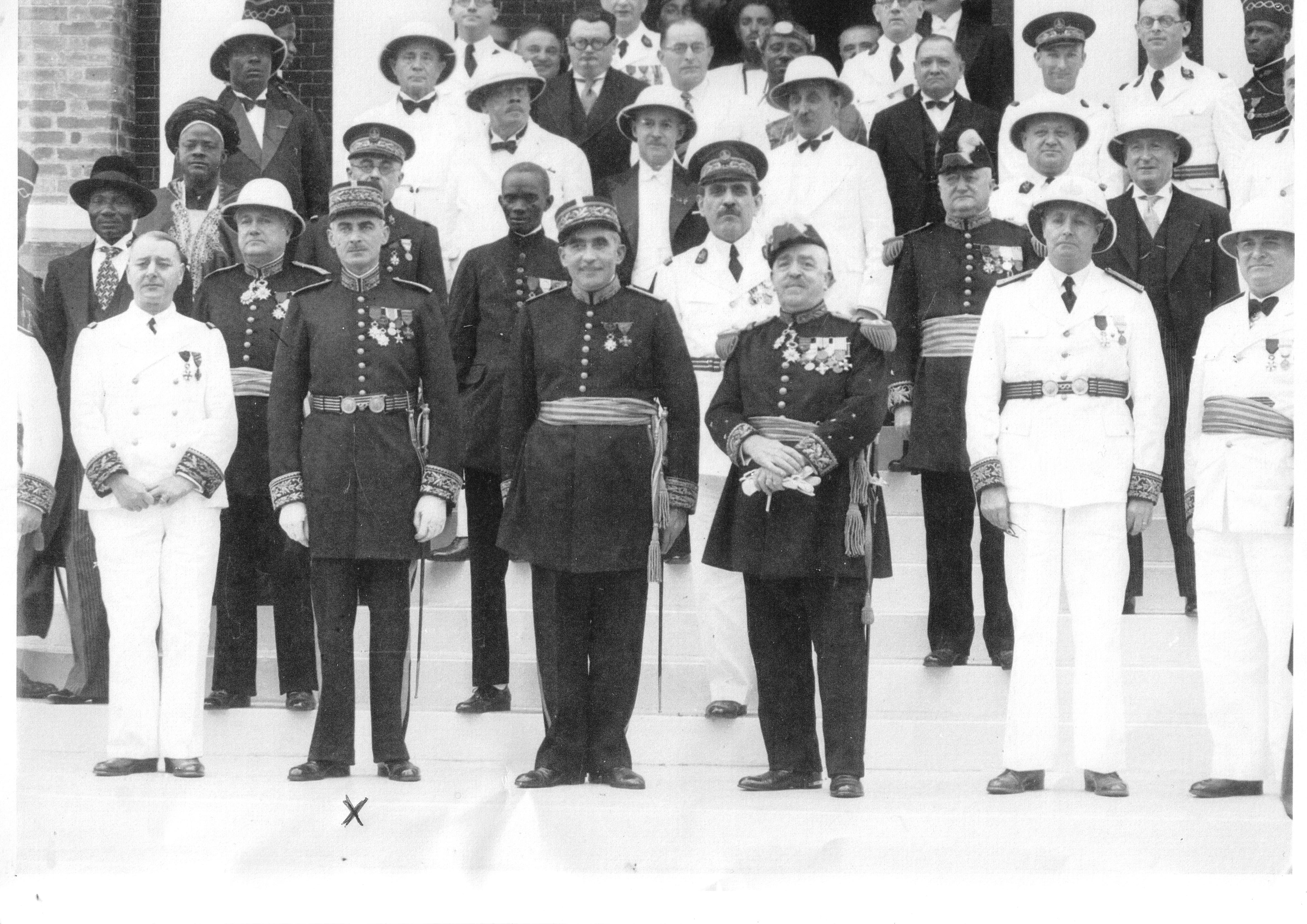
A gathering of former governors of Senegal in Paris, 1950s

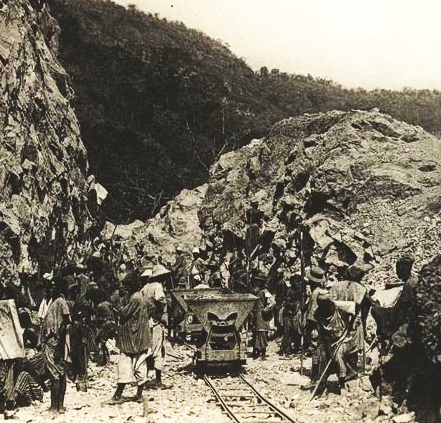
Native Africans forced into labor for the construct of the Guinée railway, 1904

Each colony of French West Africa was administered by a Lieutenant Governor, responsible to the Governor General in Dakar. Only the Governor-General received orders from Paris, via the Minister of Colonies. The Minister, with the approval of the French Chamber of Deputies (French National Assembly after 1946), chose Lieutenants Governor and Governors-General.

=== Grand Council of French West Africa ===
Beginning in 1946, a Grand Council of French West Africa was created in Dakar. Two representatives from each colony, usually the Lieutenant Governor and a representative of the French population there, were seated. This council had only consultative powers over the office of the Governor General. The functioning of such bodies rested upon the Indigénat legal code of 1885.

== Local administration ==
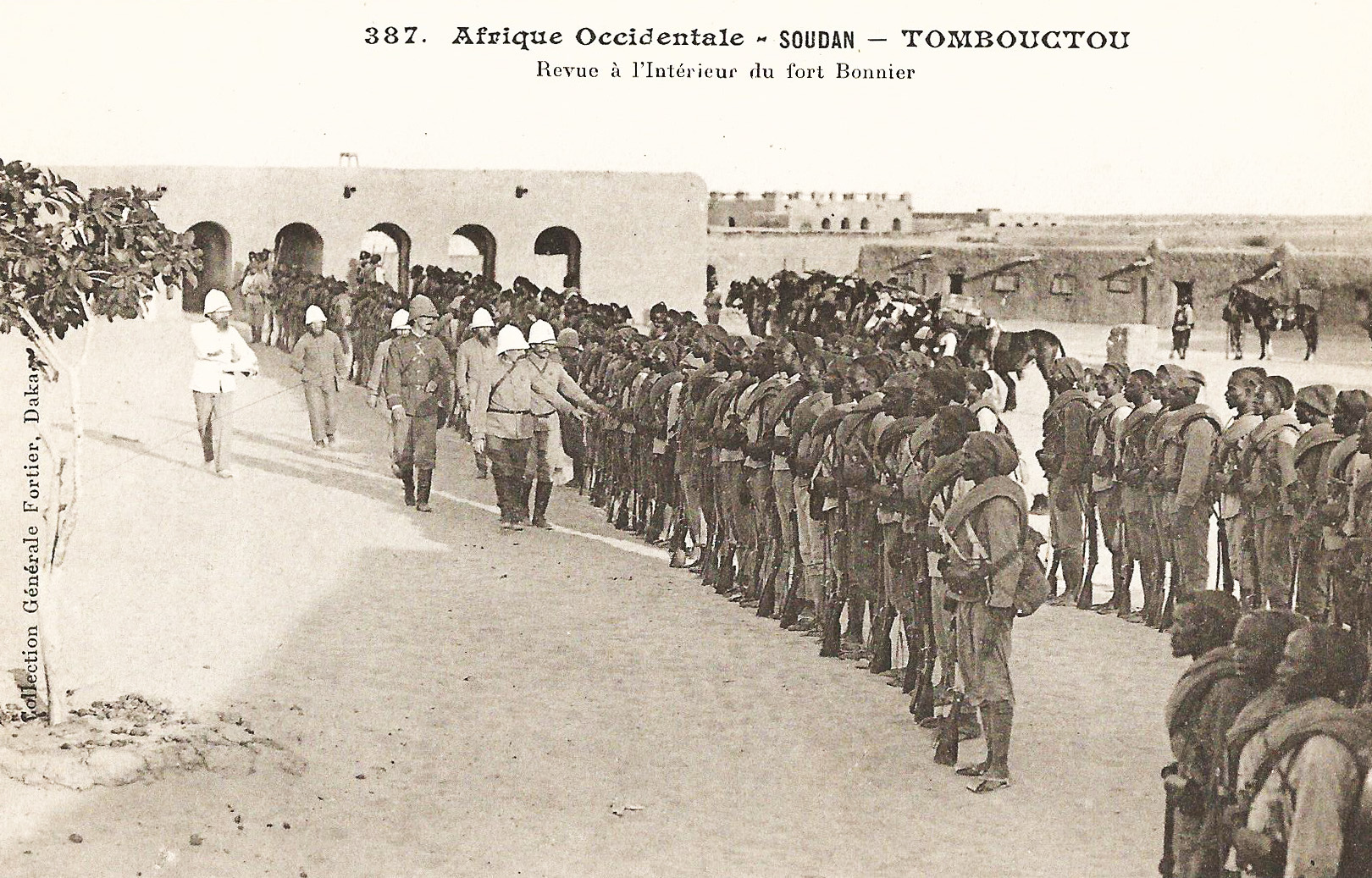
Eugène Bonnier, commander in chief of French Sudan

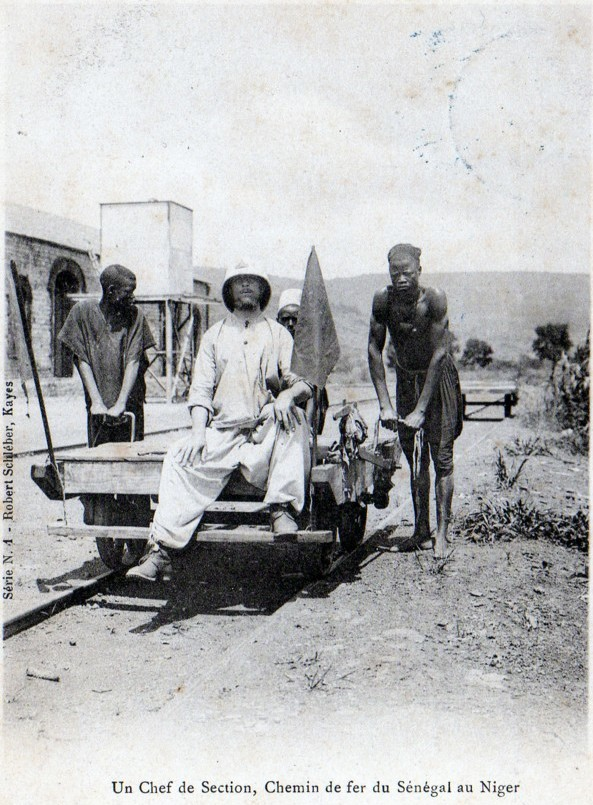
A "Section Chief" in the building of the Dakar–Niger Railway, pushed by African workers, Kayes, Mali, 1904

Despite this state of flux, and with the exception of the Senegalese Communes, the administrative structure of French rule at the lower levels remained constant, based upon the Cercle system. This was the smallest unit of French political administration in French colonial Africa that was headed by a European officer. They might range in size, but French Sudan (modern Mali) consisted of less than a dozen Cercles for most of its existence. Thus, a Cercle Commander might be the absolute authority over hundreds of thousands of Africans.

=== Cercles ===
A Cercle consisted of several cantons, each of which in turn consisted of several villages, and was almost universal in France's African colonies from 1895 to 1946.

The "Cercle Commander" ("commandant de cercle") was subject to the authority of a District Commander, and the government of the colony above him, but was independent of the Military structure (outside Military areas, e.g.: modern Niger and Mauritania prior to the Second World War). Below the "Cercle Commander" were a series of African "Chefs de canton" and "Chefs du Village": "chiefs" appointed by the French and subject to removal by the Europeans. As well, the "Cercle Commander" made use of a large number of servants, employees, and African officers such as the "Gardes-de-cercle" police, any military units seconded to them by government authorities, and sub-administrators such as the Precepteur du marché trade inspectors, etc.

Because of administrative practice and geographic isolation, Cercle Commanders had a tremendous amount of power over the lives of the Africans around them. The Cercle Commanders also had tremendous power over the economic and political life of their territories. Legally, all Africans outside the Four Communes of Senegal were "subjects" under the Indigénat legal code of 1885. This code gave summary powers to French administrators, including the rights to arrest, try, punish and imprison subjects. It also gave French local authorities the right to requisition forced labour, usually limited to able-bodied men for a few weeks a year, but in practice having few restrictions. These "tools" included the Civilizing mission ideology common in the period following the First World War. Every new Cercle Commander might well bring with him vast projects for development and the restructuring of the people's lives he governed.

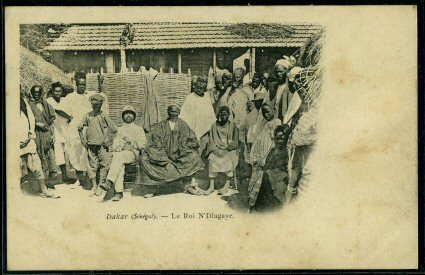
King N'Diagaye, a local chief near Dakar Senegal, receiving a French Administrator c. 1910

=== Chiefs ===
The other official office particular to the local administration of French West Africa was the "Chief". These were Africans appointed by French officials for their loyalty to France, regardless of their rights to local power. These chiefs were assigned created territories based on the scale of a French Canton, as well as on the small scale tribal structures the French found in the coastal areas of the Rivières du Sud colony in the 1880s, modern Guinea. The Canton, then, was much smaller than, and qualitatively different from, the pre-colonial states of the Sahel (such as the Toucouleur Empire) which the French would later conquer.

They were styled "Chefs de canton", "Chefs du Village", or occasionally taking the title of precolonial states assimilated by the French structure whole. This last was uncommon, but became more prevalent in the later colonial territories conquered, as fewer administrators were available to rule over larger, less populated territories with strong pre-colonial state structures.

Where these larger polities resisted the French, they were often broken into small chiefdoms. Larger polities which presented a segment of the elite who would work with the French were maintained under new leadership. The Sultan of Agadez, the Sultan of Damagaram, and the Djermakoy of Dosso are examples of these large scale "Chefs de canton". But even these rulers were replaced by individuals handpicked by French authorities.

Regardless of source, chiefs were given the right to arm small numbers of guards and made responsible for the collection of taxes, the recruitment of forced labour, and the enforcement of "customary law". In general, Canton Chiefs served at the behest of their Cercle Commander and were left to see to their own affairs as long as calm was maintained and Administrative orders were carried out.

== Geography ==
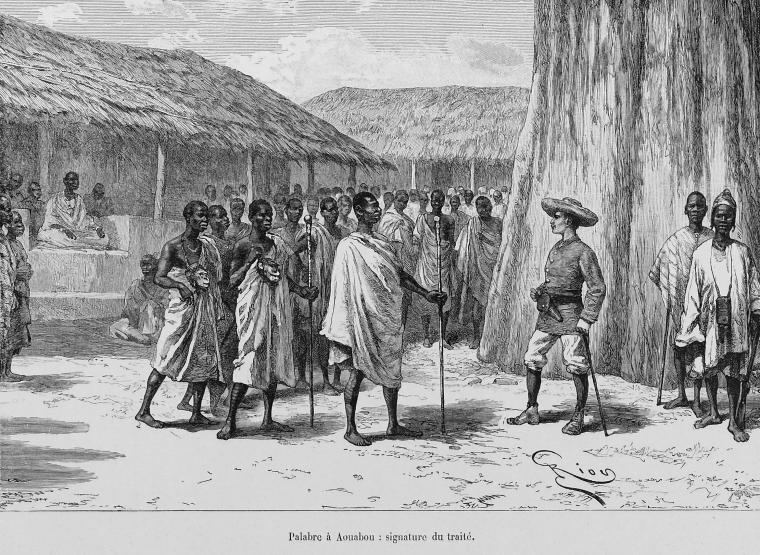
Louis-Gustave Binger signing treaty with Famienkro leaders, 1892, in present-day Ivory Coast

With an area of some 4,689,000 square kilometres (1,810,000 sq mi) (mostly the desert or semi-desert interior of Mauritania, Sudan and Niger) extending from Africa's westernmost point to the depths of the Sahara, the Federation contained more than ten million inhabitants at its creation, and some 25 million at its dissolution. The AOF included all of the Senegal River valley, most of the Niger River valley, and most of the West African Sahel region. It also included tropical forests in Ivory Coast and Guinea, the Fouta Djallon highlands, and the Aïr Mountains of modern Niger.

=== Territories ===
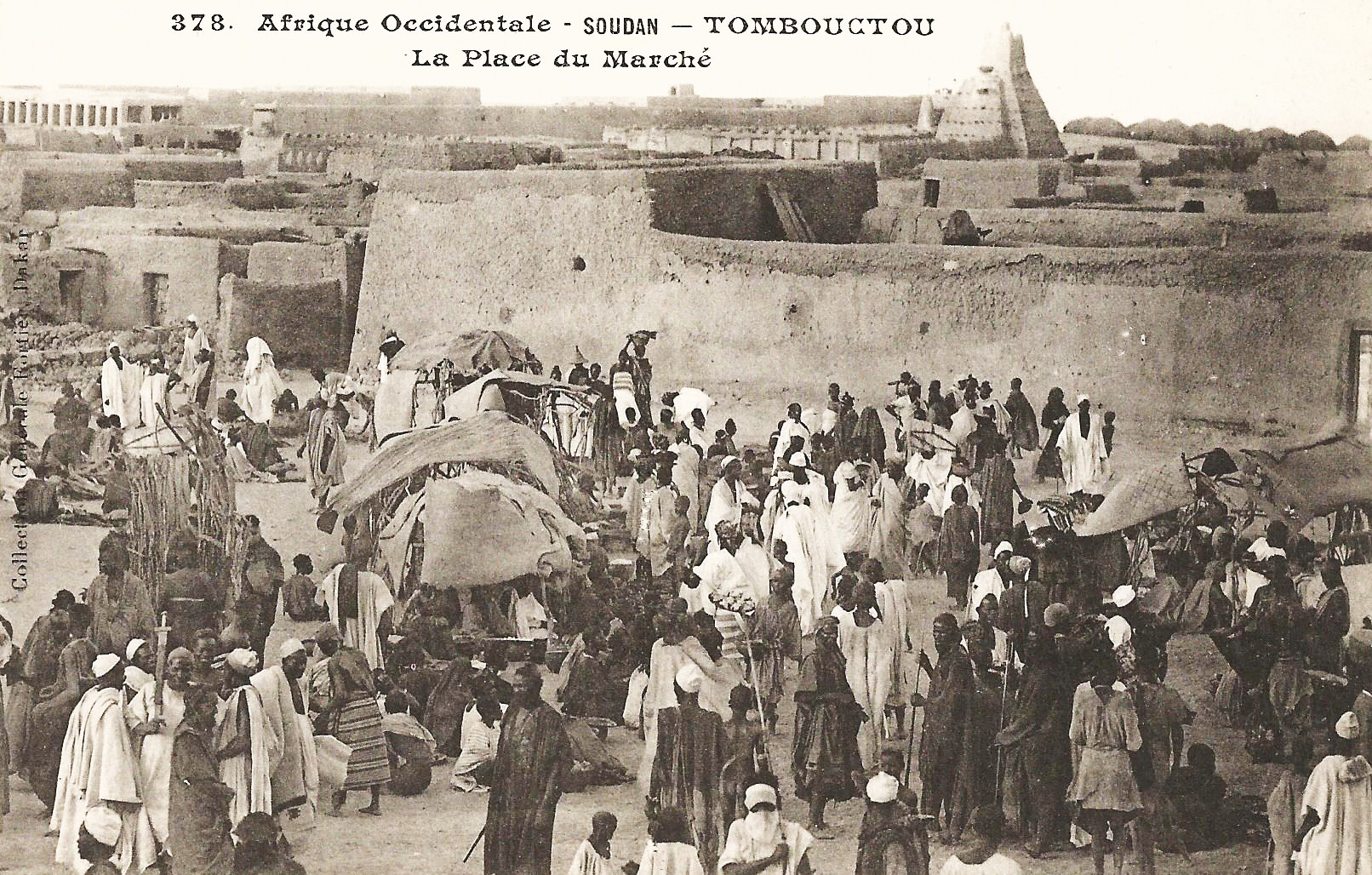
Timbuktu in French Sudan

- Ivory Coast
- Dahomey (currently Benin)
- French Sudan (currently Mali)
- Guinea
- Mauritania
- Niger
- Senegal
- Upper Volta (currently Burkina Faso)
- French Togoland (currently Togo)
- Enclaves of Forcados and Badjibo (in modern Nigeria)

== Postage stamps ==
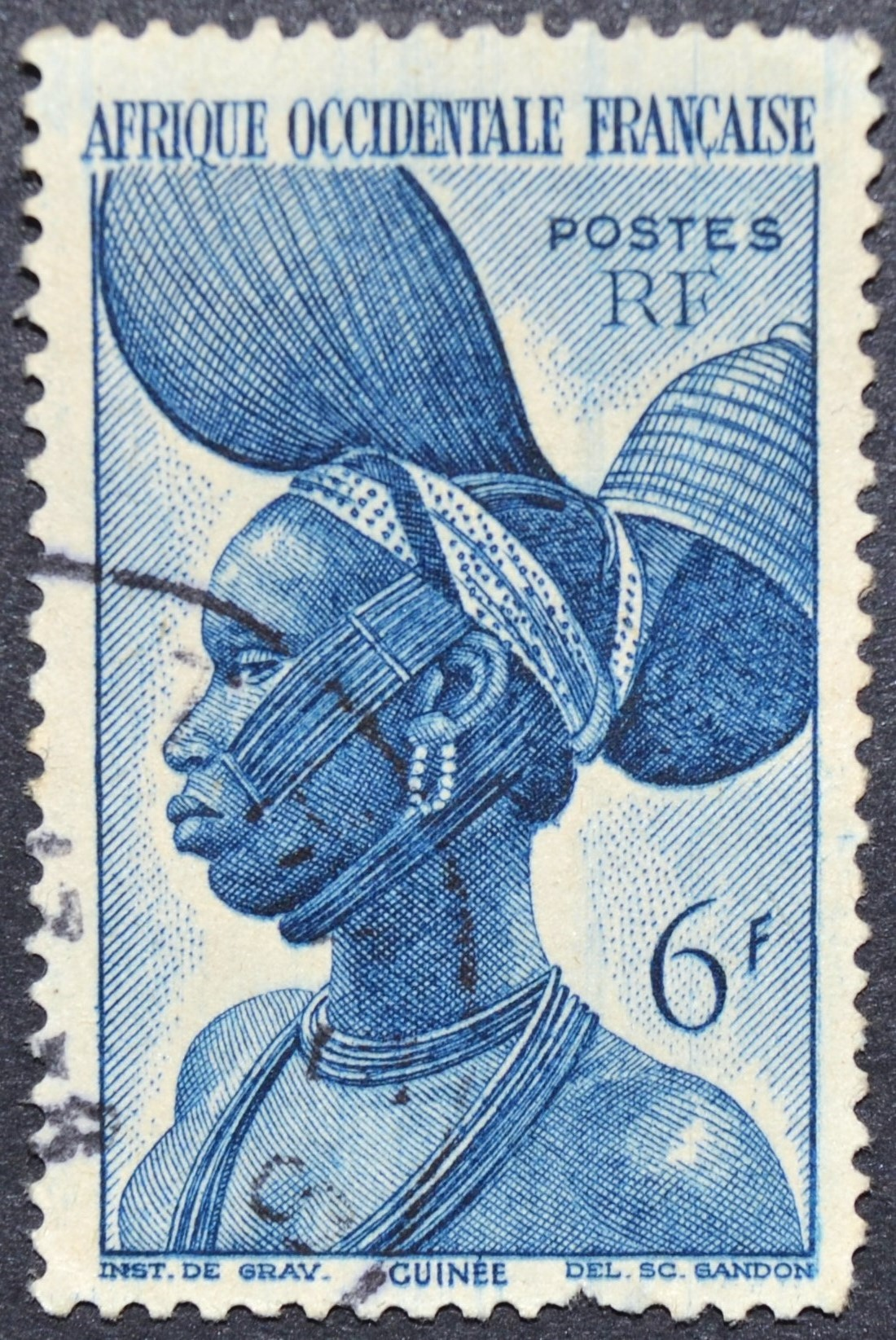
1947 series

The French colonial territories in the federation issued their own postage stamps until 1943. In many cases the stamps were inscribed with the name of the federation "Afrique Occidentale Française" as well as the colony's own name.

In 1943 and 1944, stamps of Senegal and Mauritania were overprinted with new values and valid throughout French West Africa.

The first issues printed specifically for the federation were the Eboue common design type and a definitive series depicting colonial soldiers, both in 1945. A series of 1947 featured 19 scenes and people of the various colonies, then during the 1950s there were about 30 various commemoratives. The last issue inscribed "Afrique occidentale française" and "RF" was the Human Rights issue of December 1958.

It was followed by a Stamp Day issue on 21 March 1959, which omitted the federation's name and was inscribed "CF" along with "Dakar-Abidjan" for use in Ivory Coast and Senegal.

== See also ==
- French people in Senegal
- Senegalese people in France
