= Conseil de l'Entente =

West African regional co-operation forum

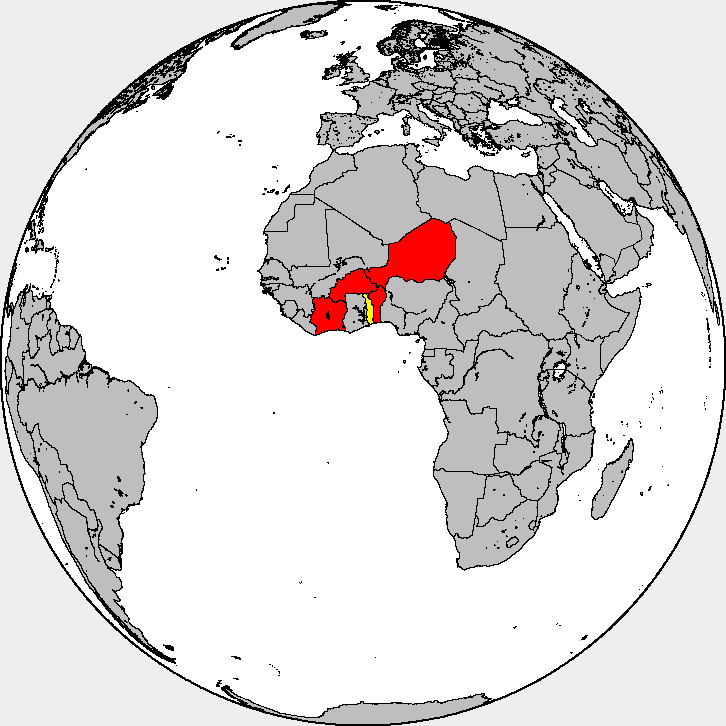
- Countries in the Conseil de l'Entente
- Secretariat: Abidjan
- Membership: Côte d'Ivoire, Niger, Upper Volta (now Burkina Faso), Dahomey (now Benin), Togo

Establishment
  - Establishment: May 1959

Logo

The Conseil de l'Entente ("Council of Accord" or "Council of Understanding") is a West African regional co-operation forum established in May 1959 by Côte d'Ivoire, Niger, Upper Volta (now Burkina Faso) and Dahomey (now Benin), and joined in 1966 by Togo.

The body grew out of the short-lived Sahel-Benin Union, which was itself created by the four original Council members as a partial successor to the dissolved French regional colonial federation of French West Africa.

Since 1966, the Council has possessed a permanent administrative Secretariat based in Abidjan, the largest city of Côte d'Ivore. A Mutual Aid and Loan Guarantee Fund exists to assist poorer members from a common pool.

== See also ==
- Entente
- Trade bloc
- International organizations
