= L'Entente =

L'Entente may refer to:

- Entente Bagneaux-Fontainebleau-Nemours, also known as l'Entente, a former football club
- L'Entente SSG, an active football club

== See also ==
- Entente (disambiguation)
