= BAE Systems Mantis =

British demonstrator programme for Unmanned Combat Air Vehicle (UCAV) technology

Mantis
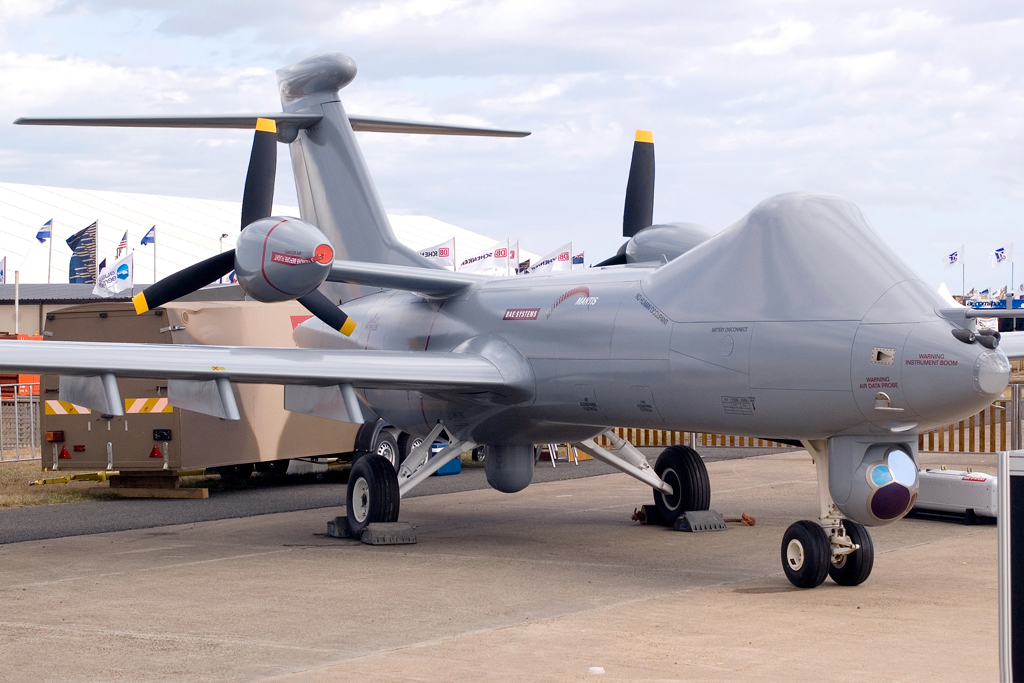
- Mock up at Farnborough Airshow 2008

General information
- Type: UAV demonstrator
- Manufacturer: BAE Systems Military Air & Information
- Status: Test programme active
- Primary user: United Kingdom

History
- Manufactured: 1
- First flight: 21 October 2009

The BAE Systems Mantis Unmanned Autonomous System Advanced Concept Technology Demonstrator is a British demonstrator programme for Unmanned Combat Air Vehicle (UCAV) technology. The Mantis is a twin-engine, turboprop-powered UCAV with a wingspan of approximately 22 m, broadly comparable to the MQ-9 Reaper. Other partners involved in Phase 1 of the Mantis programme include the Ministry of Defence (United Kingdom), Rolls-Royce, QinetiQ, GE Aviation, L-3 Wescam, Meggitt and Lola.

== Design and development ==
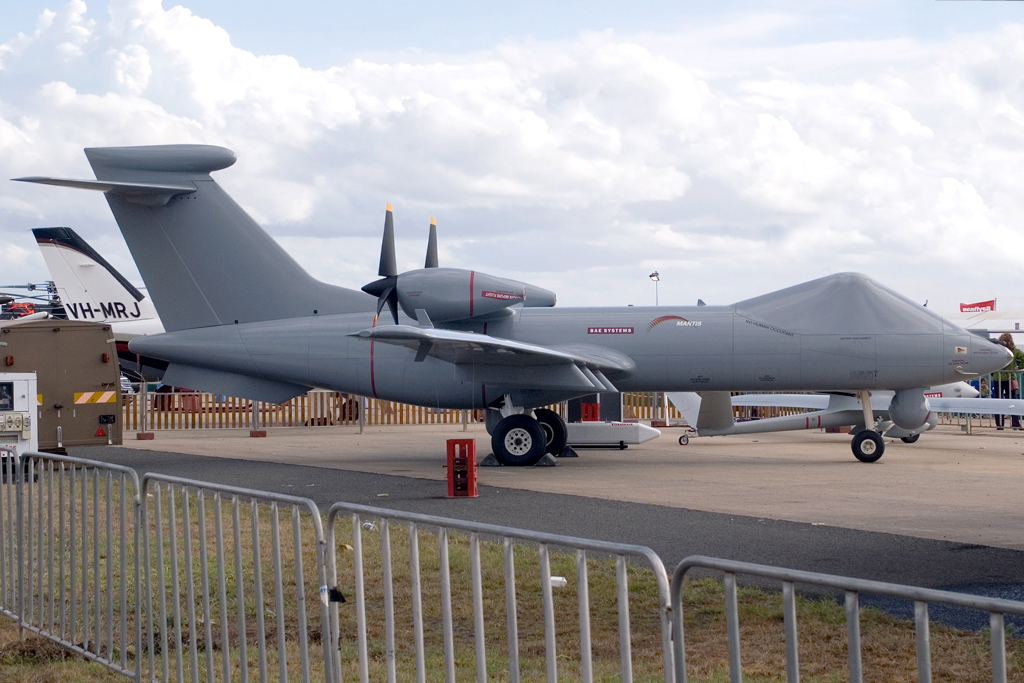
side view

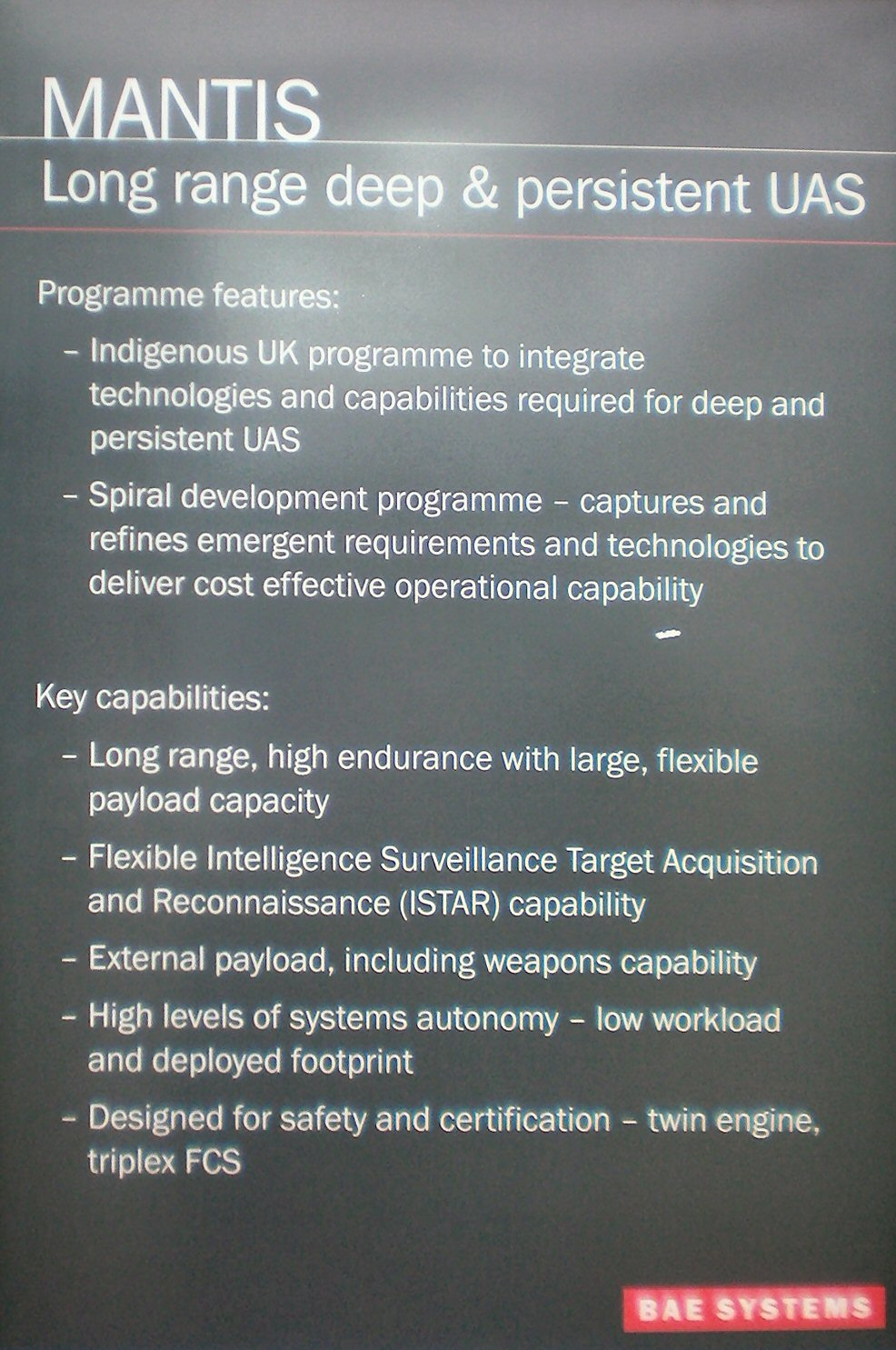
Description board for Mantis at Farnborough Airshow 2008

Development of the Mantis started in late 2007, with a mockup being revealed at the 2008 Farnborough International Air Show. The Phase 1 Mantis vehicle is powered by two Rolls-Royce Model 250 turboprop engines, although this is likely to change in later variants. The Mantis is intended to have at least 24-hour operational endurance and is an autonomous vehicle, able to pilot itself and plot its own course, communicating with personnel on the ground regarding its observations.

Phase 1 is intended to demonstrate BAE Systems' rapid prototyping capabilities and will focus on the evaluation of autonomous control systems. Later phases may evaluate civilian applications, armed variants and sensor packages.

The large dome on the front, reminiscent of a pilot's canopy, actually contains an upward facing satellite communications system.

The prototype first flew on 21 October 2009 at the Woomera Test Range in South Australia.

In 2013 the Mantis was flight tested in the United Kingdom. It was used as the basis for the BAE/Dassault Telemos, the development of which was discontinued.

== Specifications ==
Data from FlightGlobal, Rolls-Royce

General characteristics

- Crew: none (UAV)
- Length: 19.8 m (65 ft 0 in)
- Empty weight: 1,000 kg (2,205 lb)
- Max takeoff weight: 9,000 kg (19,842 lb)
- Powerplant: 2 × Rolls-Royce M250B-17 turboprop, 280 kW (380 shp) each

Performance

- Maximum speed: 560 km/h (350 mph, 300 kn)
- Cruise speed: 370 km/h (230 mph, 200 kn)
- Endurance: 30 hours

Armament

- Hardpoints: Six

Avionics

- L-3 Wescam MX-20
- BAE Systems Imagery Collection and Exploitation (ICE) system

== See also ==
- Unmanned aerial vehicle

Related development

- BAE Systems Corax
- BAE Systems HERTI
- BAE Systems Taranis
- BAE Systems GA22
- BAE Systems/Dassault Telemos

Related lists

- List of unmanned aerial vehicles
