= Sahel-Benin Union =

Former union of former French colonies

Coordinates: 13°N 1°E

Sahel-Benin Union Union Sahel-Bénin (French)
- 1958 or 1959 ?–1959
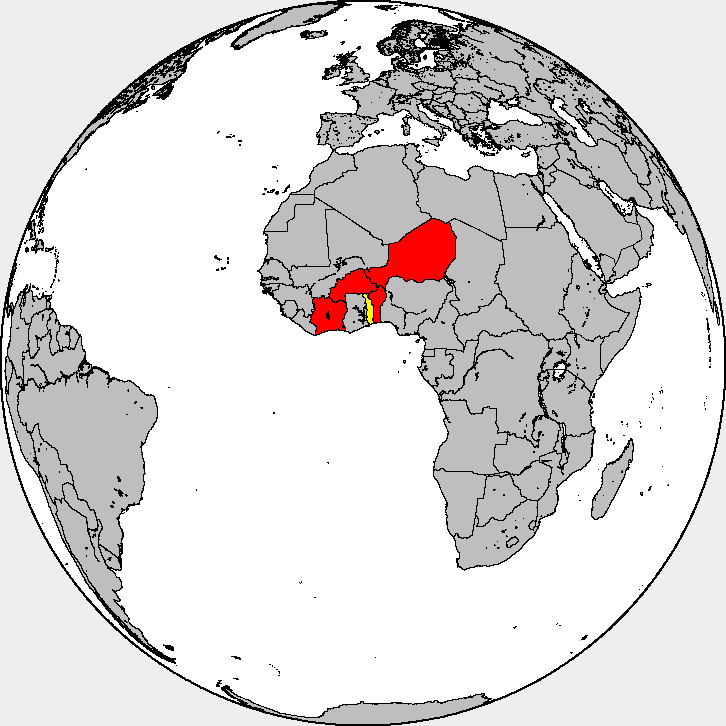
- Members of the Union in red
- Status: Union of Republics
- Common languages: French
- History
  - Proclamation: 1958 or 1959 ?
  - Dissolution and creation of the Conseil de l'Entente: May 1959
- Currency: CFA Franc
Preceded by
French West Africa
Succeeded by
Conseil de l'Entente
Ivory Coast
Niger
Republic of Upper Volta
Republic of Dahomey

Sahel-Benin Union was a short-lived union of four former French colonies of French West Africa, that were the four Republics of Upper Volta (Burkina Faso), Niger, Dahomey (Benin) and Ivory Coast.

This union "was the grouping that worked in the most efficient way for the cause of African unity. This union [...] was provided with modest but functional institutions; a Council seating with the Chiefs of States, the ministers of common affairs and the presidents of the National Assemblies [Assemblées Nationales]. A customs union was set up as well as sinking fund. A political, economic and military coordination developed.". Nevertheless, it lasted only for a short time and was replaced by May 1959 far more modestly by the Conseil de l'Entente.

== See also ==
- Conseil de l'Entente
- French West Africa
- Economy of Africa
- Economic community
- International organization
- Mali Federation
