= Entente frugale =

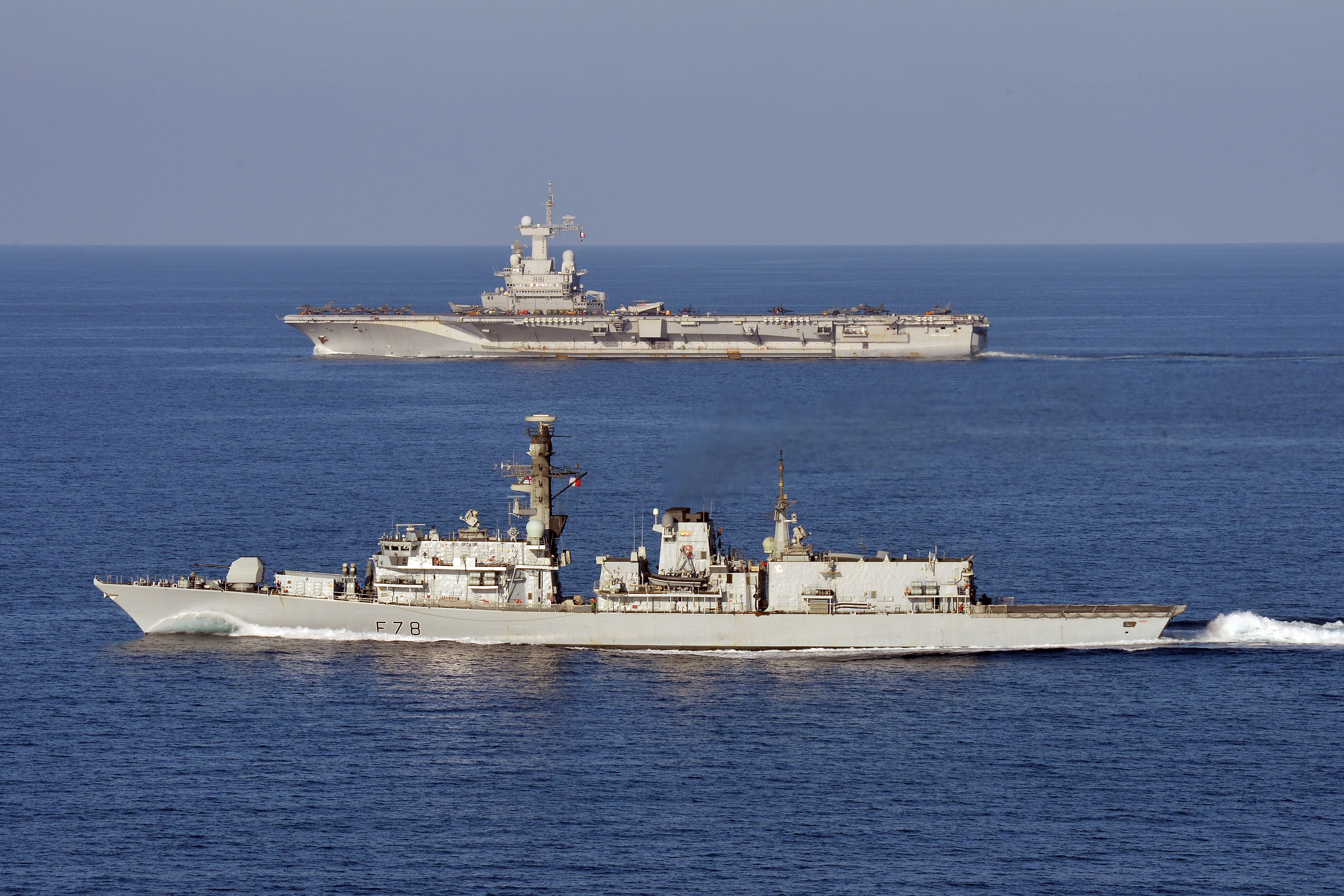
HMS Kent (foreground) escorts the French aircraft carrier Charles de Gaulle

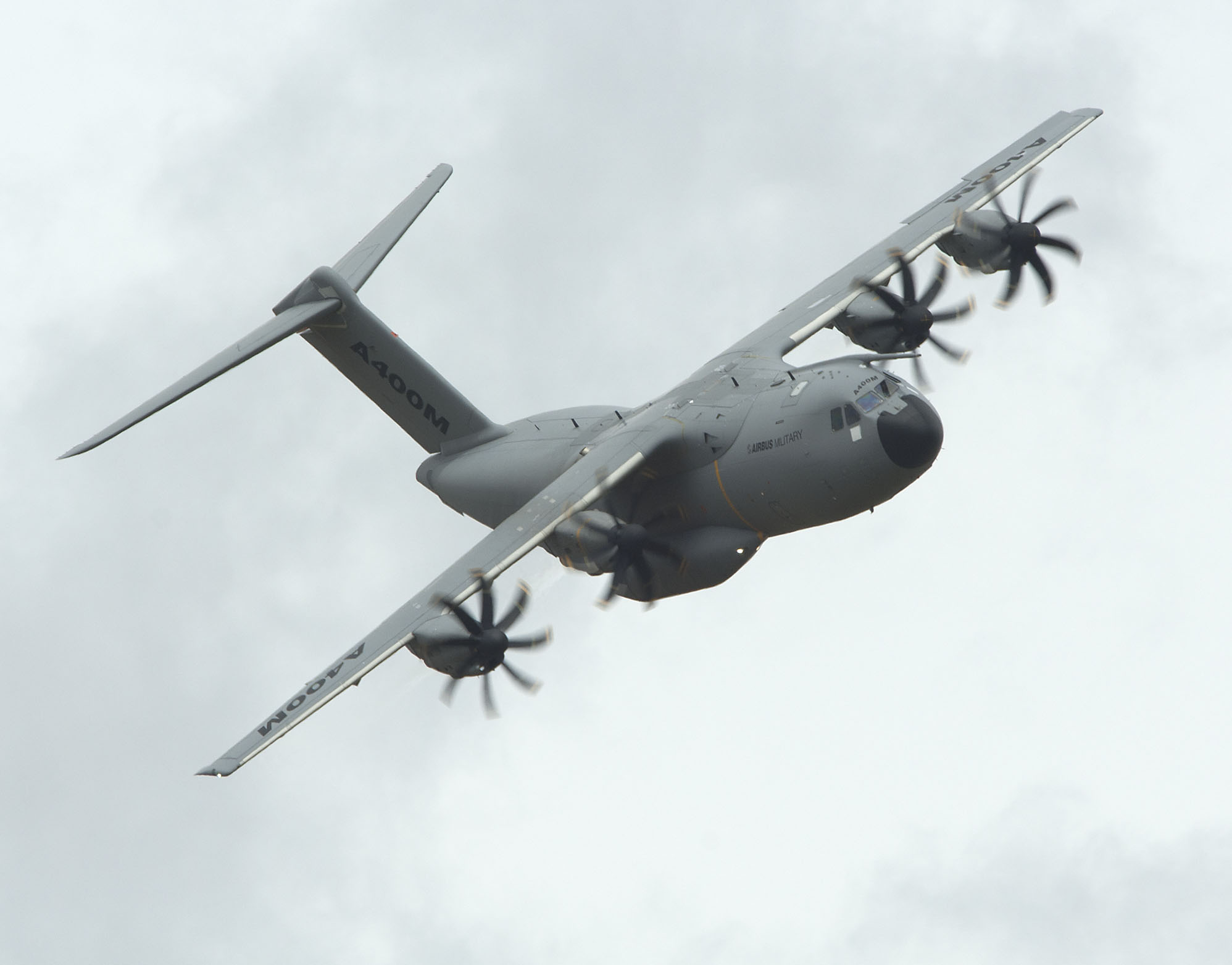
Shared support of the British and French Airbus A400M aircraft fleets has been proposed.

Entente frugale (English: lit. Frugal alliance) is the cooperation between the British and French governments, particularly in military procurement, which is driven by cost constraints, which was announced in November 2010 as part of the Lancaster House Treaties.

The name is a wry reference to the Entente Cordiale of 1904.

Together, France and the United Kingdom accounted for half of all military spending in the European Union in 2010 and two thirds of research and development.

== Proposed activities ==
- Combined Joint Expeditionary Force, with land, sea, and air components
- Cooperation on the Future Strategic Tanker Aircraft: The French armed forces may pay to use an Airbus A330 MRTT if there is spare capacity.
- Possible cooperation in Afghanistan
- Cooperation on aircraft carriers: Interoperability improvements, so warplanes from either country (F-35B Joint Strike Fighters and French navy's Dassault Rafales) could use each other's aircraft carriers.
- Joint development of new technologies for nuclear submarines
- Shared support for A400M fleets, including training
- Sharing of military communications satellites
- Cyber security
- Mine countermeasures
- Coordination of nuclear tests, and cooperation between AWE Aldermaston and CEA Valduc.
- Unmanned air vehicles, including the BAE/Dassault Telemos

== See also ==
- British Armed Forces
- French Armed Forces
