= UK-France Summit =

Bilateral summit

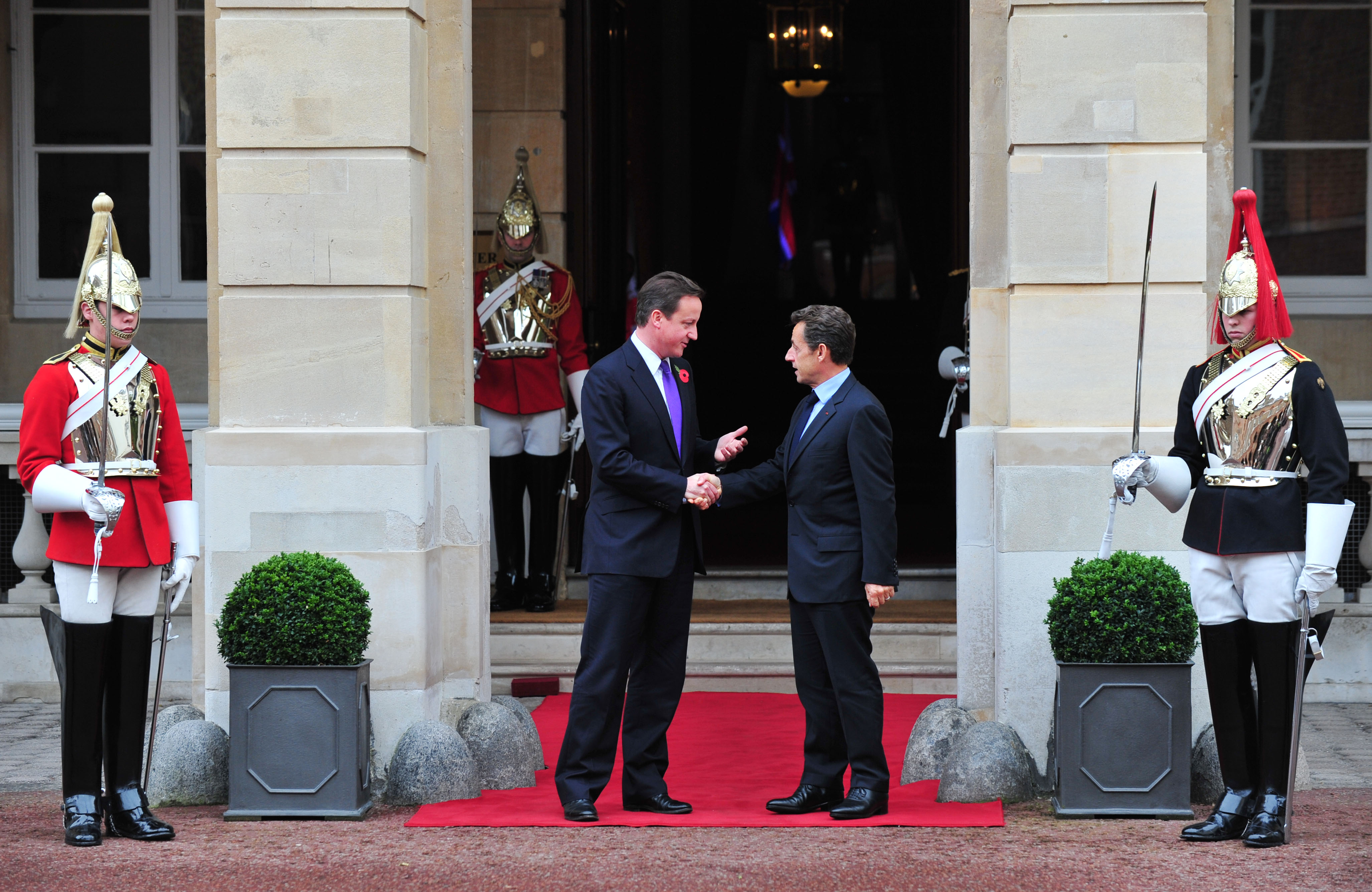
Prime Minister David Cameron greets French President Nicolas Sarkozy at Lancaster House, London, for the UK-France Summit, 2010

A UK-France Summit (in French: sommet franco-britannique or consultation franco-britannique) is a bilateral summit between France, represented by its president, and the United Kingdom, represented by its prime minister. Such summits have been held more or less annually since 1976, punctuating relations between the two countries.

== History ==
=== 2025 ===
During the UK-France Summit of July 2025, French firms committed over £1 billion in investments across the UK.

The declaration of the 37th Franco-British Summit emphasized closer cooperation between France and the United Kingdom, particularly on defence and support for Ukraine. Both countries also announced stronger collaboration on security, nuclear policy, artificial intelligence, and efforts to combat illegal migration. In addition, they called for a ceasefire in Gaza and reaffirmed their support for a two-state solution.

=== 2026 ===
In 2026, no summit is scheduled.
