= Aerospace industry in the United Kingdom =

The aerospace industry of the United Kingdom is the second-largest national aerospace industry in the world (after the United States) and the largest in Europe by turnover with a global market share of 17% in 2019. In 2020, the industry employed 116,000 people.

Domestic companies with a large presence in the British aerospace industry include BAE Systems (one of the world's largest defence contractors, with significant aerospace activities), Airbus (through its Airbus UK subsidiary), Britten-Norman, GKN, Hybrid Air Vehicles, Meggitt PLC, QinetiQ, Rolls-Royce (one of the world's leading aero engine manufacturers), Senior plc, MBDA UK and Ultra Electronics. Major foreign-owned companies with a notable footprint in the UK include Boeing (through its Boeing UK subsidiary), Lockheed Martin (through its Lockheed Martin UK subsidiary), GE Aviation (through the British facilities of its GE Aviation Systems subsidiary), Safran (through the British facilities of its Safran Landing Systems subsidiary), Thales Group (through its Thales UK subsidiary), Leonardo (through its Leonardo UK subsidiary) and Spirit AeroSystems (through its British facilities).

Current and future crewed aircraft in which the British aerospace industry has a major role include the AgustaWestland AW101, AW159, Airbus A220, A320 family, A330, A340, A350, A380, A400M, BAE Hawk, Boeing 767, 777, 787, Bombardier CRJ700, Learjet 85, Britten-Norman Defender, Britten-Norman Islander, Eurofighter Typhoon, Hawker 800, Lockheed Martin C-130J Super Hercules, Lockheed Martin F-35 Lightning II and BAE Systems Tempest. Current and future unmanned aerial vehicles in which the British aerospace industry has a major role include Airbus Zephyr, BAE Taranis, HAV 304 Airlander 10 and Watchkeeper WK450. Major engine families designed and manufactured in the United Kingdom include the Eurojet EJ200, TP400-D6, Rolls-Royce LiftSystem, Rolls-Royce Trent and Rolls-Royce UltraFan.

The British aerospace industry has made many important contributions to the history of aircraft and was solely, or jointly, responsible for the development and production of the first aircraft with an enclosed cabin (the Avro Type F), the first jet aircraft to enter service for the Allies in World War II (the Gloster Meteor), the first commercial jet airliner to enter service (the de Havilland Comet), the first aircraft capable of supercruise (the English Electric Lightning), the first supersonic commercial jet airliner to enter service (the Aérospatiale-BAC Concorde), the first fixed-wing V/STOL combat aircraft to enter service (the Hawker Siddeley Harrier), the first twin-engined widebody commercial jet airliner (the Airbus A300), the first digital fly-by-wire commercial aircraft (the Airbus A320), and the largest commercial aircraft to enter service to date (the Airbus A380).

2010 saw the establishment of the Aerospace Growth Partnership (AGP), a strategic partnership between the UK Government, industry and other key stakeholders, established to secure the future of the UK aerospace industry in the face of an ever changing, and increasingly competitive global landscape.

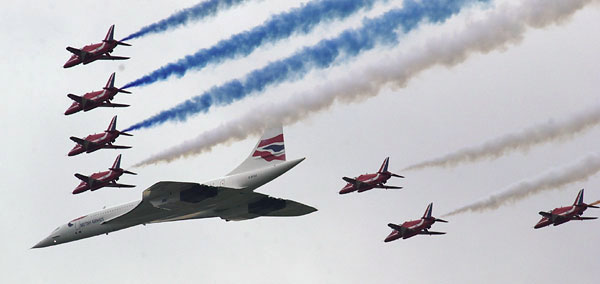
A parade flight comprising an Aérospatiale-BAC Concorde and BAE Hawks of the Red Arrows aerobatics display team for the Queen's Golden Jubilee

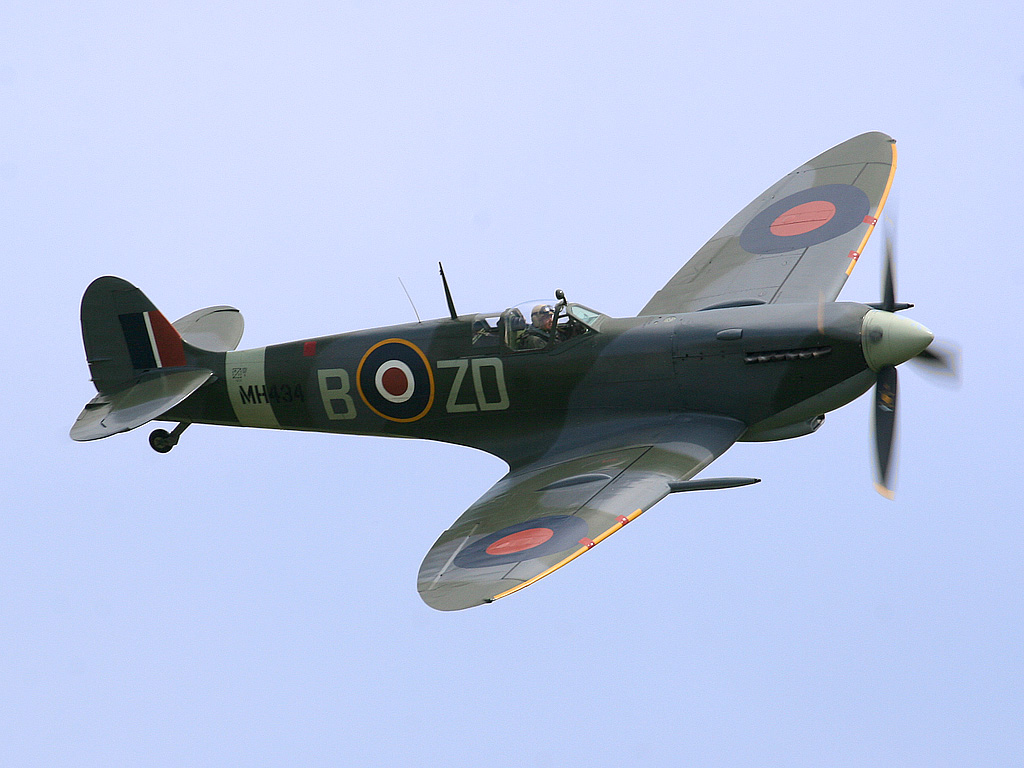
A Supermarine Spitfire, of which 20,351 were produced between 1938 and 1948

== General statistics ==
UK aerospace industry in 2013
Turnover (£ Bn.)	No. of enterprises	Economic contribution (£ Bn.)	% of economic output
24.7	634	9.44	0.9%

As of 2021, about a quarter of large communications satellites manufacture takes place in Britain.

== History ==
=== The early interest in aeroplanes ===
The desire by private individuals, often amateur gentlemen, to fly as a hobby provided the initial stimulus to the UK aviation industry. By October 1913, there were over 80 private airworthy aeroplanes, more than the airworthy planes in the recently formed Royal Flying Corps. Before the First World War, there were no regular air services and commercial aviation only really started in 1919 after the development of suitably sized aircraft during the First World War.

Whilst it was the military market that really was the source of aviation development, in the years leading up to 1914 it was, in the UK, rather sporadic. In 1909, development on behalf of the Government was stopped as being too costly. In April 1911 Britain had only 6 military aeroplanes, 2 of which were obsolete. The French War Department owned 208. However, by the start of WW1, the Naval Wing of the R.F.C. had 93 and the Military Wing had 179.

=== Pre-1900 ===
- 1862: First flight of an observation balloon in Aldershot, Hampshire
- 1875: First flight of the Aerial Steamer, a tethered aeroplane
- 1879: First flight of the British Army's first balloon, the Pioneer
- 1890: British Army Balloon Factory is established
- 1893: First experimentation by British Army of a man-lifting kite
- 1896: First flight of Frost Airship Glider

=== 1900 to 1909 ===
- 1907: First flight of British Army Dirigible No 1
- 1908: First flight of British Army Aeroplane No 1
- 1909: First flight of De Havilland Biplane No. 1 and the Short No.1 biplane

=== 1910–1914 ===
As a new technology, there was a great deal of interest from a variety of sources but often it was individuals just enthused by aviation. Between 1909 and 1914 there were about 200 active constructors, although many of them only made one or two planes. But even the production of the larger firms was not very substantial, British and Colonial Aeroplane Company, one of the largest produced just over 200 planes between 1910 and 1914.

Most of the aviation pioneers, such as Geoffrey de Havilland, Thomas Sopwith, Richard Fairey, Robert Blackburn, Frederick Handley Page, A.V. Roe and the Short Brothers had a training in engineering and their companies were usually privately financed. There were several large engineering companies who also got involved, such as Vickers in 1911, Armstrong Whitworth in 1912 British and Colonial Aeroplane Company in 1910 and Aircraft Manufacturing Company in 1912.

Along with these companies there was the early development of seaplanes, particularly near Southampton, by companies such as S. E. Saunders (originally boat builders) and Pemberton-Billing (later Supermarine). Finally, there were several French subsidiary companies who built aero-engines.

=== 1914–1918 ===
Unsurprisingly the run up to and onset of the First World War led to a massive increase in the number of companies engaged in aircraft production. Between 1912 and 1916 aircraft production was moved on to a mass production basis. But it was only by 1917 that production problems and procedures were sorted out such that there was a steady flow of aircraft, engines and spares.

By October 1918 there were 1,529 companies involved in the manufacture of aircraft. As well as aviation companies making aeroplanes there were other engineering companies also involved in making aircraft and engines (usually under licence). Companies such as shipbuilders Harland and Wolff in Belfast, engineering manufacturer, G & J Weir in Glasgow. The motor industry obviously had a capability to manufacture aeroplanes and, in particular, engines. Austin Motor Company, Daimler Company, D. Napier & Son, Sunbeam Motor Car Company and ABC Motors were all part of the wartime aviation industry. In addition there were also a large number of sub-contractors, making such things as propellers, electrical equipment, instrumentation and canvas.

However, once the War was over, the vast majority returned to their pre-war activities. The aircraft being produced in 1918 were essentially enhanced versions of the 1914 aircraft. The development of the aviation industry between 1914 and 1918 was more one of production and logistics than scientific or technical.

=== 1918–1924 ===
On 2 January 1918 the Air Ministry was founded and on 1 April 1918 the Royal Air Force was established, independent of the Army and Royal Navy. Both organisations were to fashion the nature of the aviation industry in the UK.

The first task for the government at the end of the war was to dispose of their stocks of aircraft and to deal with those on order. The Ministry of Munitions set up a Disposal Board and sold the entire surplus stock to a private company, Aircraft Disposals Company, with Frederick Handley Page as one of the key personnel.

As soon as the war was finished and the government demand for aircraft ceased some of the remaining aircraft companies tried to diversify into other activities but with limited success or simply closed down. For instance, Airco looked at car manufacture and was bought by the Daimler Company parent company Birmingham Small Arms whilst Martinsyde and Sopwith briefly tried motor cycles. By 1920 the British aerospace industry consisted of 28 aeroplane constructors and a dozen aero engine designers. However, much of their work was of a trivial nature and engine orders were so low that Rolls-Royce nearly left the aviation sector.

The aviation industry was left with the core of pre-war producers and a few companies whose interest in aviation had been aroused. This latter category included companies such as the Norwich engineering firm Boulton & Paul, Westland Aircraft, the wartime offshoot of engine manufacturers Petters Ltd and Gloucestershire, later, Gloster Aircraft Company formed from Cheltenham-based luxury liner outfitters H.H. Martyn & Co..

Nonetheless, there was still determination to stay particularly from the enthusiastic pioneers such de Havilland and Sopwith. As soon as Airco and Sopwith Aviation Company were declared bankrupt,(due to the Treasury demanding payment for excess profits) within months Tommy Sopwith and Geoffrey de Havilland both established new companies, H.G. Hawker Engineering later Hawker Aircraft and De Havilland Aircraft Company.

==== Civil aviation ====
The Government established a Civil Aerial Transport Committee (that included H. G. Wells and Tommy Sopwith) that reported in December 1918. Their key recommendation was that steps should be taken to foster civil aviation in order, in part, to maintain a manufacturing base that could supply the country's military needs. However, Government policy for civil aviation was, initially, according to the then Secretary of State for Air, Winston Churchill, on 11 March 1920 in the House of Commons to let it "fly by itself……any attempt to support it artificially by floods of State money will not ever produce a really sound commercial aviation service which the public will use, and will impose a burden of an almost indefinite amount upon the Exchequer".

Air transport companies were established in 1919–20, several of which were subsidiaries of aircraft manufacturers, such as Handley-Page, Airco and Blackburn Aircraft. A number of the companies failed or found themselves in difficulty, due to high operating cost, low demand that was also seasonal, high fares and heavily subsidised French competition and so it was decided in April 1922 to offer support and by October subsidies were given to individual airlines operating set routes.

Matters were improved when aircraft specifically designed for commercial operation were introduced. The DH.34 and Handley Page W.8 lowered the operating costs for airlines, making them more economically viable.

Eventually, however, the state did involve itself in civil aviation and on the advice of the Hambling Committee, creating Imperial Airways in 1924 from the four main air transport companies. However, the Air Ministry did not actively engage with the development of commercial aircraft, despite the recommendation of the 1918 Civil Aerial Transport Committee and was later criticised by the 1938 Cadman Report for this.

==== Airports ====
In order for civil aviation to expand, airports, close to major towns and cities and ancillary support such as weather forecasting and wireless telegraphy would be crucial. This idea was first laid out by Frank Pick in his dissenting memorandum in the 1918 Report of the Civil Aerial Transport Committee.

The Air Ministry focused mainly on the military aspects of its remit, and held to the notion that state involvement was unnecessary because airports should be left to the private sector and municipal authorities.

The Department for Civil Aviation had been created within the Air Ministry in 1919 with Sir Frederick Sykes at its head. He outlined a plan for civil aviation and included a structure for the creation of airports. However, the post was downgraded and in April 1922, he resigned. Sir Sefton Brancker took over and he too understood that airports would be a key to the development of civil aviation and enthusiastically lobbied and encouraged provincial towns and cities to organise the planning.

Brancker's campaign could claim its first practical results in 1929 when Nottingham, Blackpool and Hull each opened a licensed aerodrome. Manchester, Bristol and Plymouth followed suit in 1930.

Sir Sefton Brancker died in the R101 crash in 1930 and his successor, Francis Shelmerdine, was not so enthusiastic and cited financial difficulties as one of the reasons for the slowdown in the impetus.

Nonetheless by1939, in England and Wales a total of 38 municipal aerodromes had been established. In addition, there were three in Scotland and one each in Belfast and Jersey.

The Air Ministry and the Ministry of Health were jointly responsible for approving aerodromes. The Air Ministry dealt with aviation matters, concentrating on the safety aspects of the positioning of buildings, the quality of the airfield and especially possible hazards surrounding the aerodrome.

In 1936, transport engineer Henry Maybury chaired the committee for the Development of Civil Aviation in the United Kingdom. His report in 1937 came closest in its reasoning to a national master-plan, with its proposed 'system of airports', linked to a planned pattern of regulated internal services.

The failure in the early 1920s to establish the network of 'key aerodromes', or even a barely adequate aviation infrastructure in comparison to the contemporary achievements in Germany and France, was a contributory factor to the progressive weakening in relative international terms of Britain as a civil aviation power during the inter-war period. For instance, in 1927 German aviation carried almost eight times more passengers than British carriers. However, the municipal airports movement after 1929 began to repair this deficiency.

==== Military aviation ====
The Air Ministry worked in the early years on the basis that there would be no war in Europe in the immediate future and that the main requirement for aircraft would be policing the colonies. Such activity would not require sophisticated aeroplanes to be developed.

Nonetheless, the Government needed to ensure that the aircraft industry did not shrink to a size dangerous for national defence and that there would be sufficient aircraft and aero engine companies to sustain the United Kingdom's military requirements for the variety of types of aircraft and engines.

Consequently, there came into being an arrangement with Society of British Aircraft Constructors that contracts could be shared around a limited number of companies, this became known as The Ring.

The Air Ministry would draw up a specification which would be given to 'approved firms' who would then submit tenders for prototypes. The Air Ministry would select several prototypes and finally a choice for production would be made.

The work was spread out over about 18 aviation companies. The winning company for a tender would not necessarily be given the complete construction work, which on occasions would be spread out to other companies to ensure that they, the other companies, were able to stay in business.

=== 1925–1939 ===
==== Civil aviation ====
There was a particular success in this period with the growth of privately owned light aircraft. In 1924 the Air Ministry initiated a policy of financial assistance to light aeroplane clubs. Despite Air Ministry support, what really made the difference was the launch of the De Havilland Gipsy Moth in 1924; an immensely popular aircraft ideally suited to flying clubs and popularised by famous aviators such as Amy Johnson, Jean Batten, and Sir Francis Chichester.

However, for airliners in this period the UK lagged behind European countries. In 1931 Belgium operator Sabena was the only other European airline company using British aircraft. The aeroplanes of German manufacturer Junkers and Dutch company Fokker were dominant and after 1930 American passenger aircraft took a leading part. In 1938 Neville Chamberlain flew a British Airways Ltd Lockheed 10 Electra for his meeting with Adolf Hitler.

The reasons for this were not difficult to find. Imperial Airways largely ignored European routes preferring to focus on imperial markets in Africa and India. Imperial Airways' Handley Page aircraft were comfortable and safe but slow. There was no competition on these routes, so there was little incentive to spend money on developing new, faster and more efficient aircraft.

==== Flying boats ====
However, the lack of suitable landing airfields in many Empire counties in the inter War period did lead to Imperial Airways commissioning Short Brothers in 1935 to build 28 flying boat aircraft for passengers and freight (particularly airmail). The Second World War effectively stopped the further development of the flying boat as after the War there were plenty of suitable land aircraft, notably the Douglas DC-3, and airfields for flying boats to be redundant.

==== Research and Development ====
The aviation industry was to benefit significantly from aeronautical research carried out in the late 1920s and the 1930s. The academic centres were University of Cambridge, where they had established a chair in aeronautical engineering in 1919, and, indeed, most of the leading British aeronautical engineers were Cambridge graduates, and Imperial College London. For instance, Sir Frank Whittle the inventor and developer of the jet engine and W.E.W. Petter the designer of the Westland Lysander and, after World War Two, the English Electric Canberra, and Folland Gnat, both studied mechanical sciences at Cambridge University.

John Siddeley, 1st Baron Kenilworth, the aero engine producer, gave Cambridge University £10,000 for aeronautical research and the arm dealer Basil Zaharoff endowed a chair of aviation at Imperial College.

Much work was also done at the Royal Aircraft Establishment in Farnborough, Hampshire, the research and development organisation under the auspices of the Air Ministry. Research work was, for instance, carried out in wind tunnels, and other projects such as research on electrical heating systems for guns, reliable navigation lamps, better engine magnetos and ignition systems.

- 1910: Avro company formed
- 1910: First flight of British Army Airship Beta
- 1910: First flight of Bristol Boxkite
- 1910: First flight of Short S.27
- 1910: Bristol Aeroplane Company formed as British and Colonial Aircraft Company
- 1911: Vickers forms aviation department and begins producing aircraft
- 1911: First flight of Admiralty Airship No 1
- 1912: Royal Flying Corps is formed
- 1912: First take off from a moving ship
- 1912: First flight of Royal Aircraft Factory B.E.2
- 1912: First flight of Short S.41

=== 1939 to 1945 ===
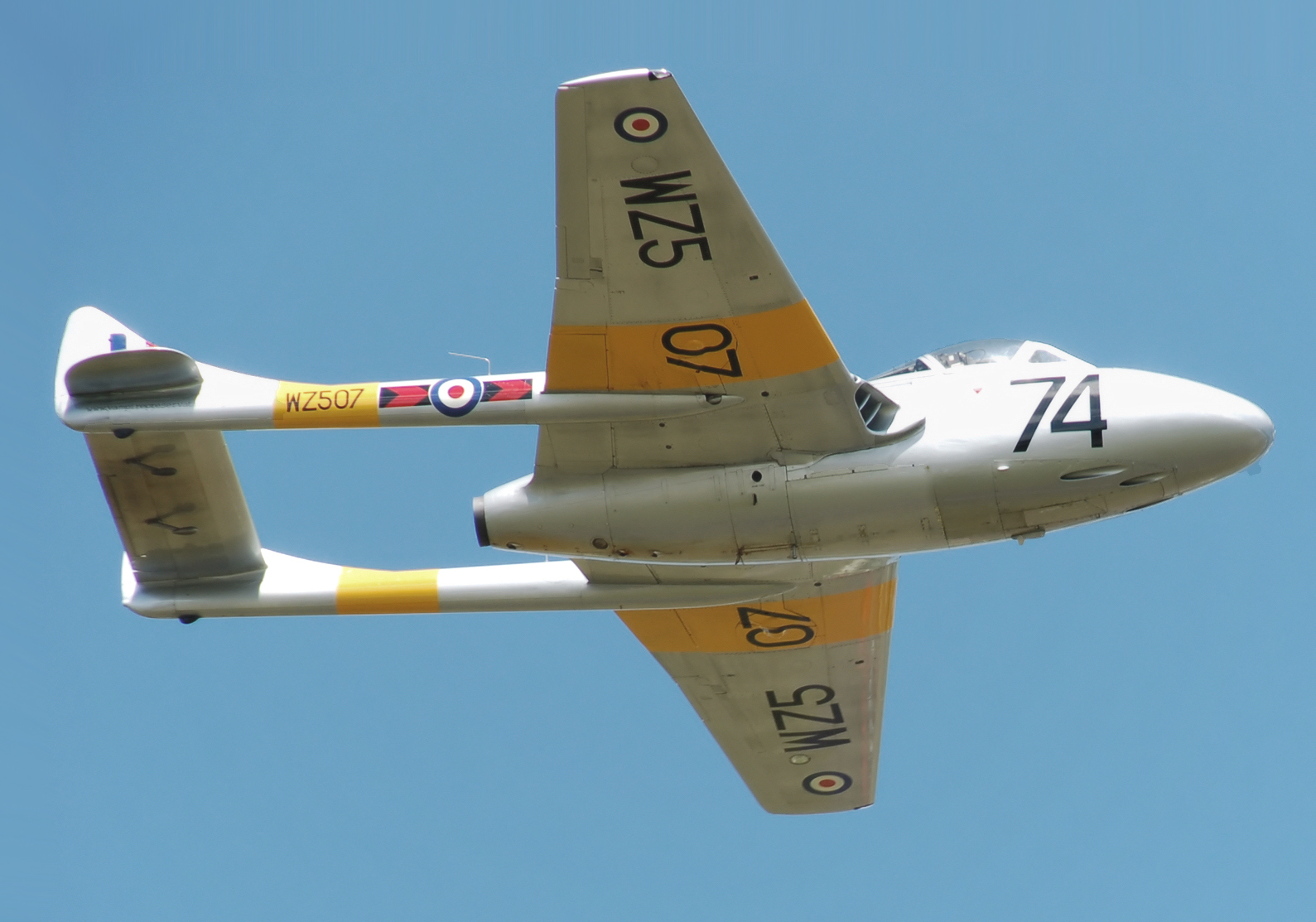
de Havilland Vampire

- 1943: First flight of De Havilland Vampire
- 1944: First flight of Avro Lincoln

=== 1945 to 1949 ===
- 1946: First flight of Westland Wyvern
- 1947: First flight of De Havilland Venom
- 1948: First flight of Supermarine Swift
- 1949: First flight of Avro Shackleton
- 1949: First flight of Vickers Varsity
- 1949: First Flight of Avro 707
- 1949: First Flight of De Havilland Comet

=== 1950 to 1959 ===
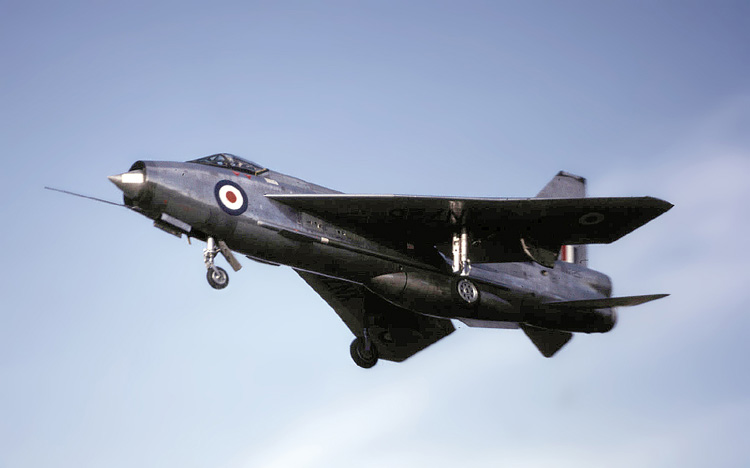
English Electric Lightning

- 1950: First flight of Hawker Hunter
- 1950: First flight of Hawker P.1072
- 1950: First flight of Boulton Paul P.111
- 1950: First flight of Percival Provost
- 1951: First flight of Gloster Javelin
- 1951: First flight of De Havilland Sea Vixen
- 1951: First flight of Vickers Valiant
- 1951: First flight of Handley Page HP.88
- 1952: First flight of Short SB5
- 1952: First flight of Avro Vulcan
- 1952: First flight of Handley Page Victor
- 1954: First flight of Fairey Delta 2
- 1954: First flight of English Electric Lightning
- 1954: First flight of BAC Jet Provost
- 1955: First flight of Folland Gnat
- 1957: First flight of Saunders-Roe SR.53
- 1958: First flight of Blackburn Buccaneer

=== 1960 to 1969 ===
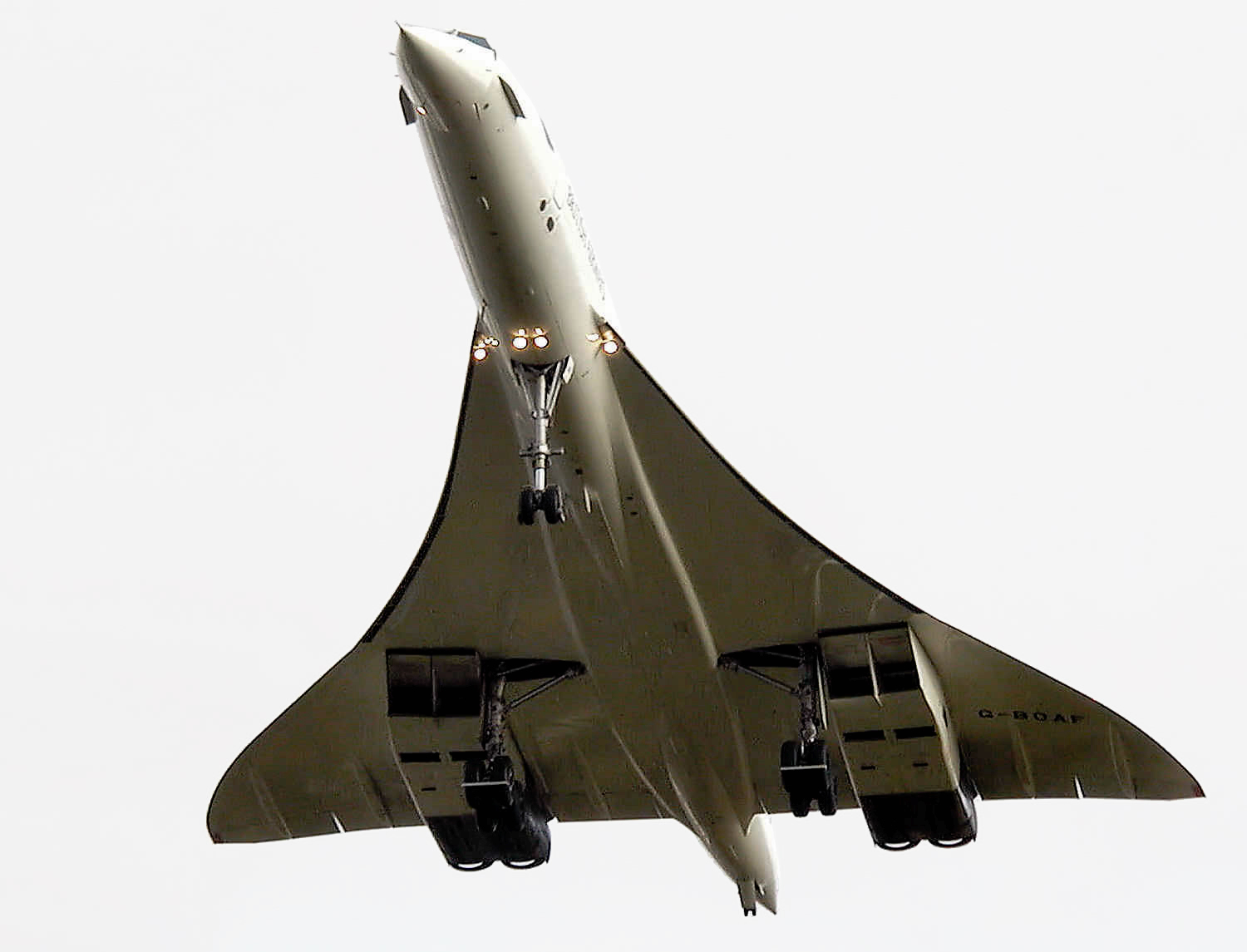
Aérospatiale-BAC Concorde

- 1960: First flight of Hawker Siddeley P.1127
- 1962: First flight of Bristol 188
- 1962: First flight of Hawker Siddeley Trident
- 1964: First flight of Hawker Siddeley Kestrel
- 1964: First flight of BAC TSR-2
- 1965: First flight of Britten-Norman Islander
- 1967: First flight of Hawker Siddeley Harrier
- 1967: First flight of BAC Strikemaster
- 1967: First flight of Hawker Siddeley Nimrod
- 1967: First flight of Handley Page Jetstream
- 1968: First flight of SEPECAT Jaguar
- 1969: First flight of Aérospatiale/BAC Concorde
- 1969: First flight of Scottish Aviation Bulldog

=== 1970 to 1979 ===
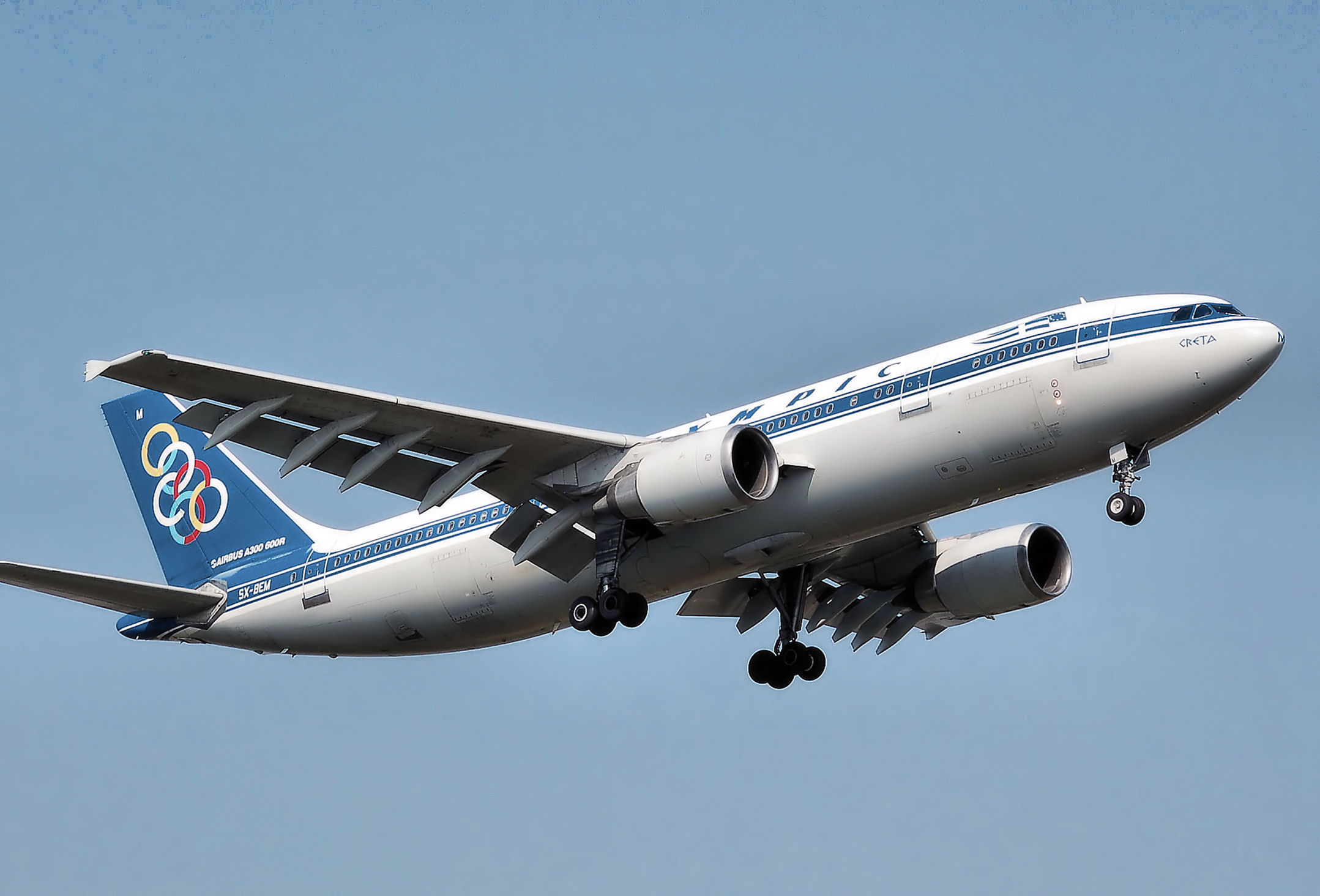
Airbus A300

- 1970: First flight of Britten-Norman Defender
- 1971: First flight of Britten-Norman Trislander
- 1971: First flight of Westland Lynx
- 1972: First flight of Airbus A300 (wings designed and built in the UK)
- 1974: First flight of Panavia Tornado
- 1974: First flight of BAE Hawk
- 1979: First flight of Panavia Tornado ADV
- 1979: First flight of Westland 30

=== 1980 to 1989 ===
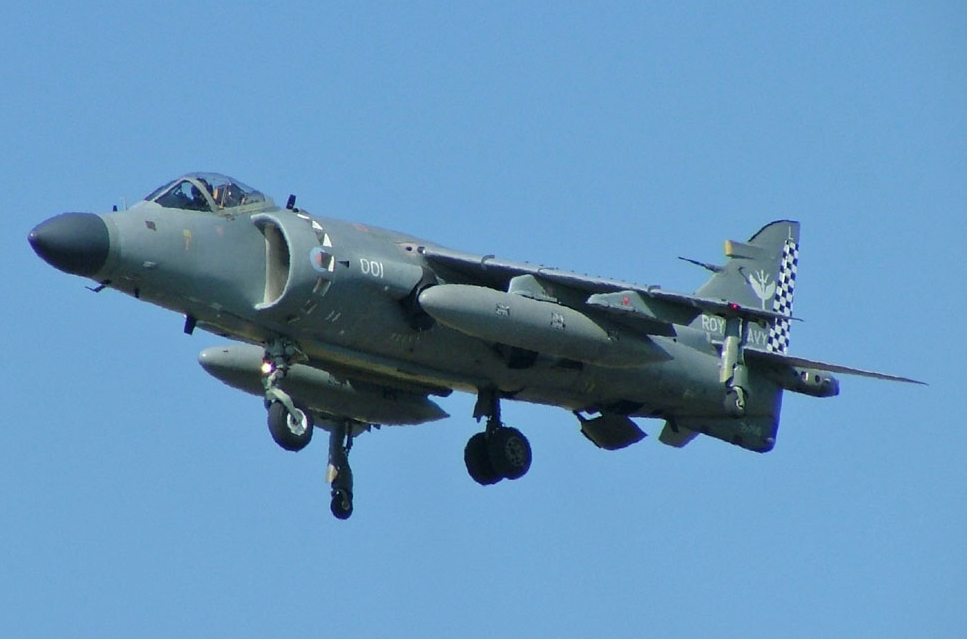
BAE Sea Harrier FA2

- 1981: First flight of BAe 146 (the UK's last commercial jetliner)
- 1982: First flight of Airbus A310 (wings designed and built in the UK)
- 1986: First flight of British Aerospace EAP
- 1986: First flight of British Aerospace Hawk 200
- 1986: First flight of British Aerospace ATP
- 1987: First flight of EH101
- 1987: First flight of Airbus A320 (wings designed and built in the UK)
- 1988: First flight of BAE Sea Harrier FA2

=== 1990 to 1999 ===
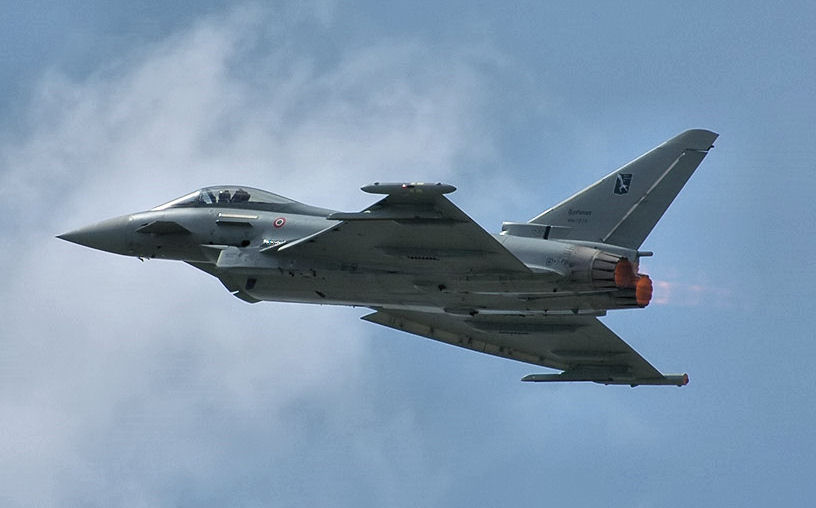
Eurofighter Typhoon

- 1991: First flight of Airbus A340 (wings designed and built in the UK)
- 1992: First flight of Airbus A330 (wings designed and built in the UK)
- 1993: Beginning of development of BAE Replica
- 1994: First flight of Eurofighter Typhoon
- 1996: First flight of Bombardier Global 5000 (forward fuselage, nacelles and HTP manufactured in Belfast)
- 1996: British Aerospace teams with Lockheed Martin and Northrop Grumman to develop Joint Strike Fighter (JSF) (now the F-35 Lightning II)
- 1999: British Aerospace merges with Marconi Electronic Systems to form BAE Systems
- 1999: First flight of Bombardier CRJ700 (centre fuselage and nacelles manufactured in Belfast)

=== 2000 to 2009 ===
- 2001: First flight of Bombardier Challenger 300 (centre fuselage manufactured in Belfast)
- 2002: Beginning of UAV development at BAE Systems
- 2004: First flight of BAE HERTI
- 2004: First flight of Nimrod MRA4
- 2005: First flight of Airbus A380 (wings designed and built in the UK)
- 2006: Introduction of Bombardier Challenger 605 (centre fuselage manufactured in Belfast)
- 2007: First flight of US101
- 2008: First flight of Bombardier CRJ1000 (centre fuselage and nacelles manufactured in Belfast)
- 2008: Delivery of first Bombardier Q400NextGen (fuselage manufactured in Belfast)
- 2009: First flight of AgustaWestland AW159
- 2009: First flight of BAE Systems Mantis
- 2009: First flight of Airbus A400M (wings designed and built in the UK)

=== 2010 to 2019 ===
- 2012: First flight of Hybrid Air Vehicles HAV 304/Airlander 10
- 2013: First flight of BAE Taranis
- 2018: First flight of Airbus Zephyr S

=== 2020 to present ===
- 2020: First flight of BAE Systems PHASA-35
- 2021: First flight of Rolls-Royce ACCEL
- 2023: First flight of Vertical Aerospace VX4
- 2026: First flight of Leonardo Proteus

== Current major projects ==
=== Crewed civil fixed-wing aircraft ===
- Airbus A350, A330 and the Airbus A320 family have their wings and fuel systems built in the UK. The A350 has so far achieved 564 firm orders and has its wings developed in Filton and assembled in Broughton. Rolls-Royce is currently the only engine supplier to the A350 with the Trent XWB.
- Spirit AeroSystems facilities in Northern Ireland manufacture the composite wings and mid-fuselage for the Airbus A220 (formerly the Bombardier C-Series), alongside parts for Bombardier Aviation business jets (including the centre fuselage of the Challenger 350, centre fuselage and engine nacelles of the Challenger 650, the forward fuselage, engine nacelles, and horizontal stabiliser for the Global 5500 and Global 6500, and the composite horizontal stabiliser for the Global 7500

=== Crewed military fixed-wing aircraft ===
- Eurofighter Typhoon, the British aerospace industry has a 37.5% share in the production of the Eurofighter Typhoon and a 33% share in the development of the aircraft. The main participants are BAE Systems and Rolls-Royce. The UK had 40,000 jobs involved in the construction of the Eurofighter Typhoon, across 400 suppliers. Comparatively, the next largest contributor to the Eurofighter Typhoon, Germany, had 25,000 jobs involved and 400 suppliers.
- BAE Hawk is one of the best-selling advanced jet trainers in the world and has generated billions of pounds in exports for the British aerospace industry. BAE Systems and Rolls-Royce are the two main participants and, so far, over 900 Hawks have been sold worldwide.
- F-35 Lightning II, the UK aerospace industry has a workshare of about 20% in the aircraft and has two companies in "Team JSF", BAE Systems and Rolls-Royce. BAE Systems designed and produces the aft fuselage, fuel system, horizontal and vertical stabilizers among other things. Rolls-Royce provides the Liftfan for all F35Bs.
- Airbus A400M has a workshare roughly equivalent to its share of procurement, which equates to about 14%. Due to traditional Airbus roles, Airbus UK developed the wings for the A400M and outsourced some of the manufacturing; however, the final assembly takes place in Filton.
- Saab JAS 39 Gripen, over 30% of the content within Gripen is manufactured in the UK, according to Saab. The carrier-based concept, the "Sea Gripen", was also designed in the UK.
- TAI TFX, BAE Systems was chosen to provide technical assistance on the design of the Turkish fifth-generation fighter. A memorandum of understanding (MoU) was also signed between EuroJet (of which Rolls-Royce is the largest shareholder) and Turkey's ASELSAN on the development of the aircraft's propulsion.
- Aeralis Advanced Jet Trainer, the first variant in a family of modular light jet aircraft which can be reconfigured to cover roles such as basic jet trainer, operational trainer, aerobatics/display and light combat.
- The Global Combat Air Programme (GCAP) is developing a sixth-generation fighter in cooperation with Japan and Italy. A technology demonstrator, named BAE Systems Tempest is currently in development.

=== Civil and military UAVs and UCAVs ===
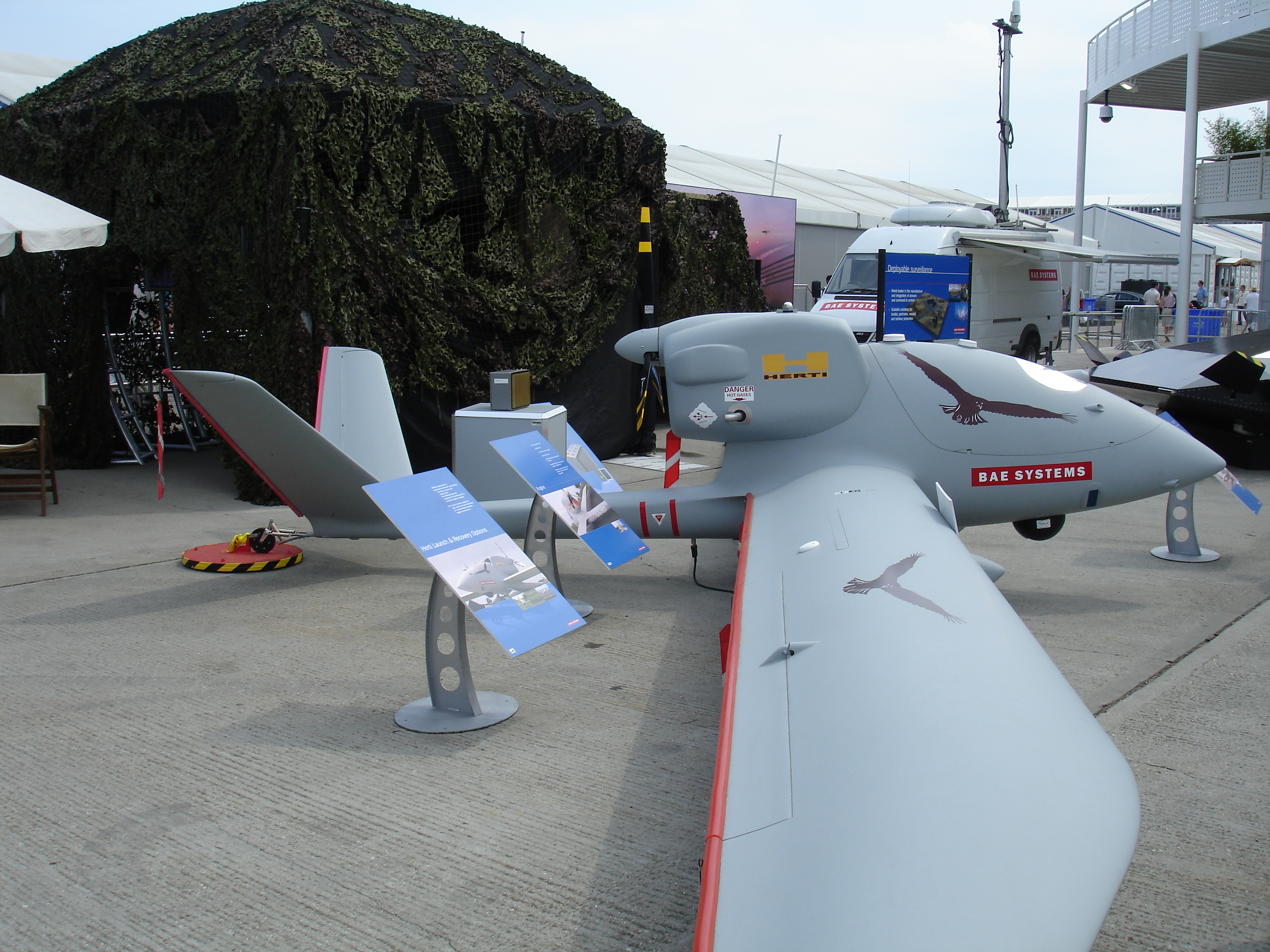
BAE Systems HERTI

- BAE HERTI, developed by BAE Systems. It first flew in 2004 and was successfully deployed to Afghanistan on trials in 2007. An armed version, named BAE Fury, was revealed in 2008.
- BAE Mantis, a MALE UAV technology demonstrator, developed by BAE Systems, which first flew in 2009. It was hailed as the world's first fully autonomous drone by BAE Systems. Technology from it was to be used in an Anglo-French MALE UAV named Telemos, however, France effectively abandoned Telemos in 2012 after it joined a collaboration with Germany and Italy instead. The Royal Air Force has since selected the Certifiable Predator B from the US-based General Atomics to fulfill its future MALE UAV requirements.
- BAE Taranis, a UCAV technology demonstrator developed by BAE Systems in partnership with Rolls-Royce, QinetiQ and GE Aviation Systems. Technology derived from it is to be used in the development of an Anglo-French Future Combat Air System that will equip the air forces of the UK and France by 2030.
- Future Combat Air System, an Anglo-French UCAV currently in development. It will use technology derived from BAE Taranis and Dassault nEUROn. It is expected to enter service by 2030.
- Hybrid Air Vehicles HAV 304 Airlander 10, a hybrid airship developed by Hybrid Air Vehicles based in Bedfordshire. It is currently the world's-largest aircraft.
- QinetiQ Zephyr, a HALE UAV developed by QinetiQ. In July 2010, it made the world's longest recorded flight of an unrefuelled UAV with a flight that lasted 336 hours, 22 minutes and 8 seconds.
- Selex ES has developed a range of small battlefield UAVs, such as the Falco and ASIO. Most of these have been developed in collaboration with Italian companies.
- Thales Watchkeeper WK450, an ISTAR UAV developed by Thales UK in partnership with Elbit Systems of Israel. It is based on the Hermes 450. The British Army plans to operate a fleet of 54 Watchkeeper UAVs. France has expressed interest in buying the system and an armed version has also been pitched to Poland.
- BAE Systems PHASA-35, a High-altitude long endurance (HALE) UAV. The aircraft made a first flight in February 2020.
- Spirit Mosquito, a technology demonstrator for the RAF's Lightweight Affordable Novel Combat Aircraft (LANCA) programme which aims to deliver an autonomous UCAV capable of fighting alongside crewed fighter aircraft.
- Vixen, a Royal Navy programme which aims to deliver a carrier-borne UAV for use in roles including airborne early warning and control, surveillance, electronic warfare, aerial refuelling and strike.
- Malloy Aeronautics develops a family of heavy lift vertical take-off and landing (VTOL) UAVs.
- Leonardo Proteus, an uncrewed rotorcraft in development for the Royal Navy by Leonardo Helicopters in Yeovil, England.

=== Helicopters ===
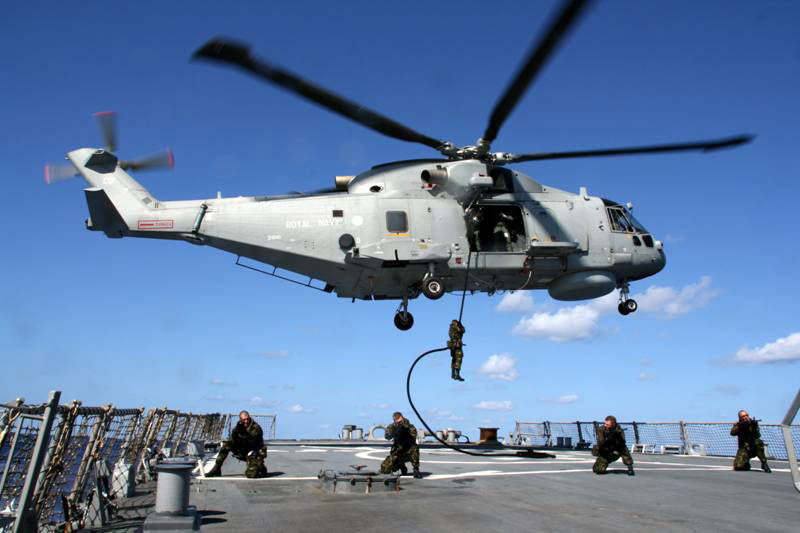
AgustaWestland AW101

- AgustaWestland AW101, a medium-lift helicopter developed for both military and civil applications. It was designed by Westland Helicopters in collaboration with Italy's Agusta. It made its first flight in 1987. It is manufactured in Yeovil, England, originally by AgustaWestland, a joint company formed by GKN of the UK and Finmecannica of Italy in 2000. However, GKN sold its 50% share of AgustaWestland to Finmecannica in 2004, giving Finmecannica total ownership of the company. AgustaWestland became Leonardo Helicopters when AgustaWestland was merged into Finmecannica in 2016, and Finmecannica was renamed Leonardo in 2017. As of August 2016, the AW101 has been exported to 11 countries.
- AgustaWestland AW159 Wildcat, a significantly improved version of the Super Lynx. It is manufactured by Leonardo Helicopters in Yeovil, England. It first flew in 2009 and entered operational service in 2014 with the British Army. It has been exported to South Korea and the Philippines.
- AgustaWestland AW149, a medium-lift multi-role military helicopter. An AW149 production line is planned to be opened at Yeovil if Leonardo Helicopters' bid in the New Medium Helicopter programme is successful.

=== Engines ===
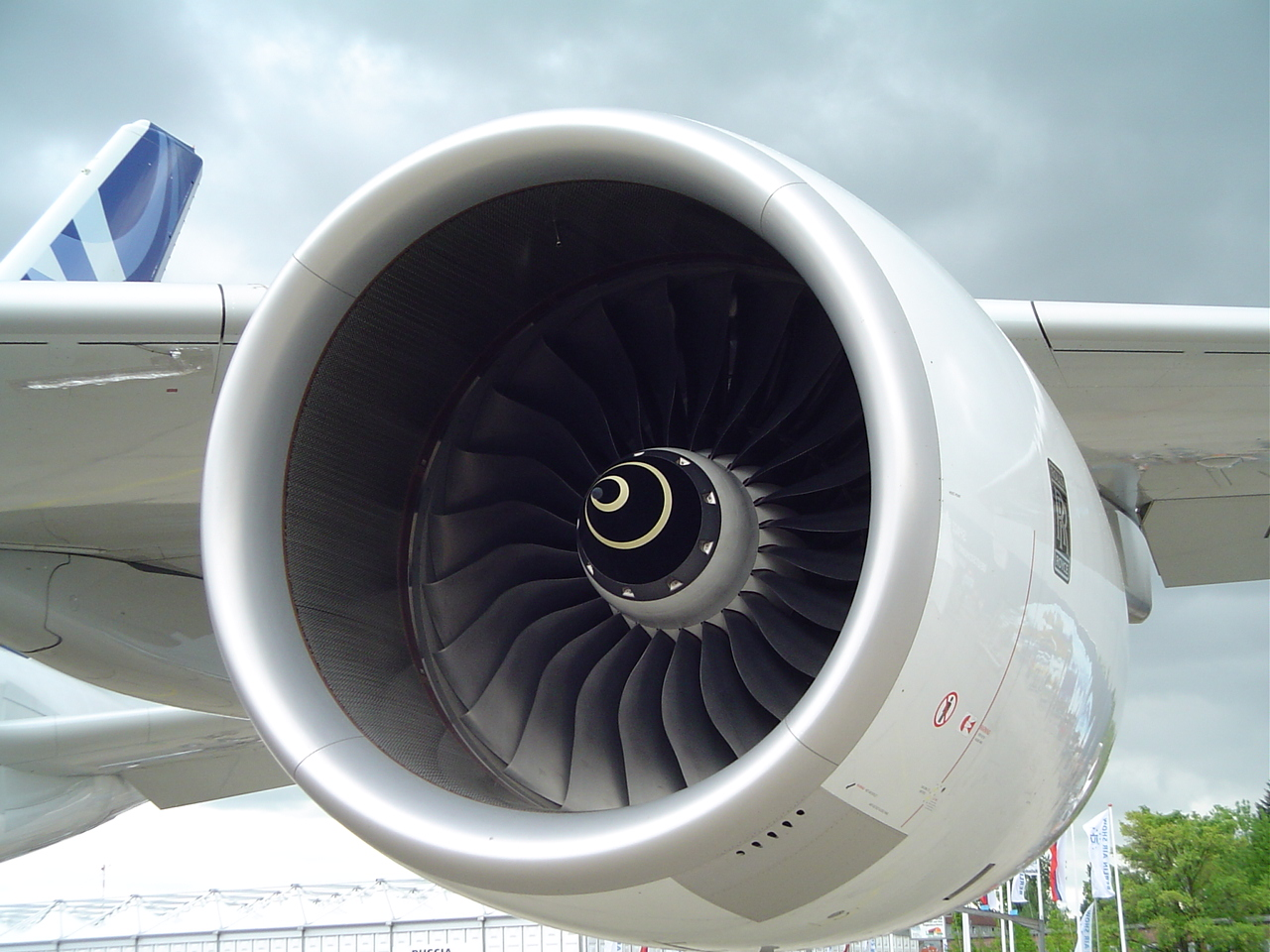
Rolls-Royce Trent 900

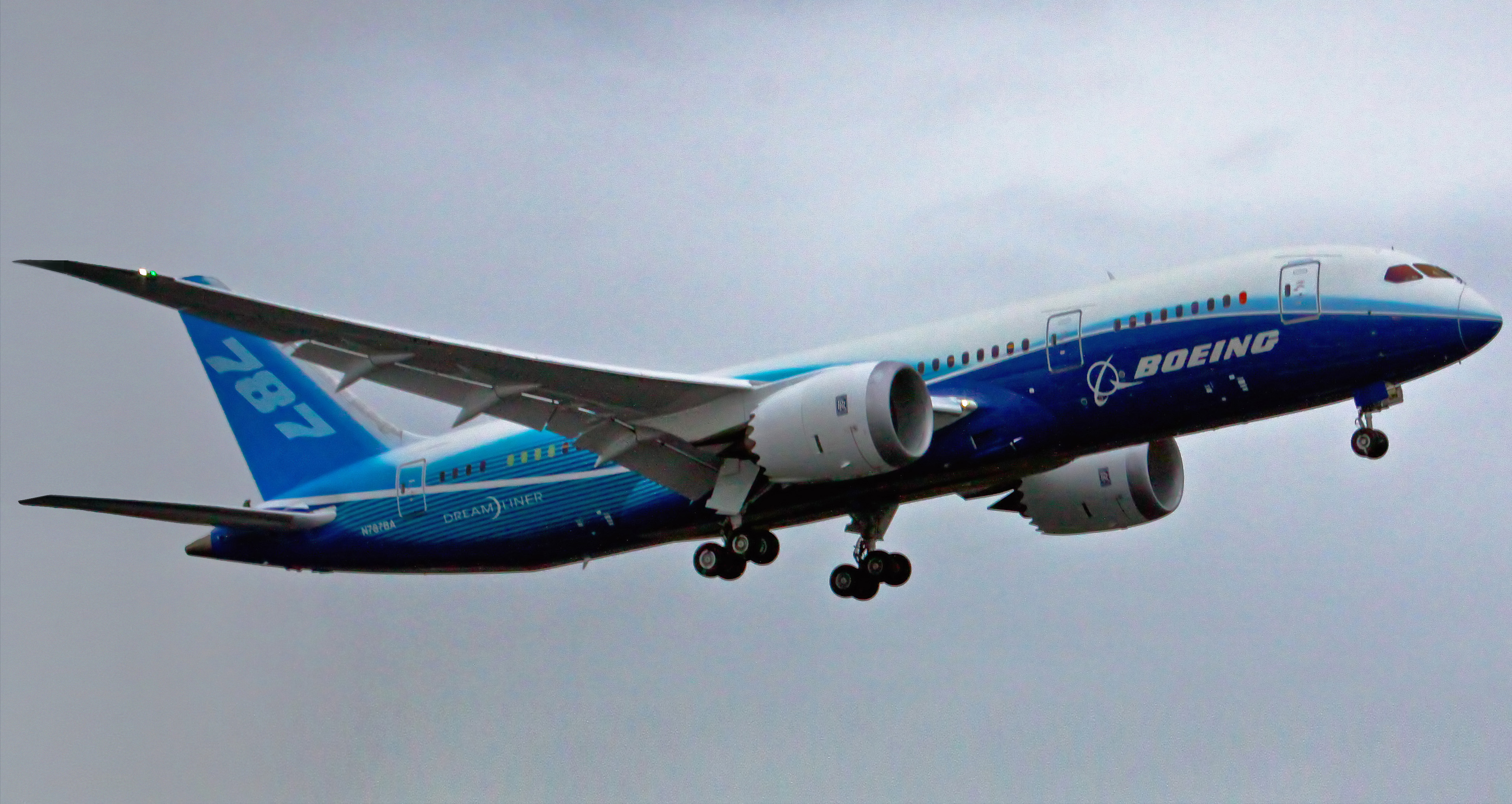
A Boeing 787 powered by Rolls-Royce Trent 1000 engines

- Eurojet EJ200, the powerplant of the Eurofighter Typhoon. Rolls-Royce has a 33% share in development and a 34.5% share of production. The EJ200 is based on the XG.40 engine research programme carried out by Rolls-Royce and the UK Ministry of Defence in the 1980s.
- General Electric/Rolls-Royce F136, the alternative engine for the F-35 Lightning II. Rolls-Royce had a 40% workshare in the engine. Development was cancelled in December 2011 after failing to obtain Pentagon support for further development.
- Rolls-Royce Turbomeca Adour MK951, an Anglo-French co-development for the SEPECAT Jaguar and later adopted for the Hawk trainer jet. It was also recently used in the BAE Taranis UCAV technology demonstrator. Rolls-Royce has a 50% workshare in the Adour and the final assembly line is in Bristol, United Kingdom.
- Europrop International TP400-D6, the powerplant of the Airbus A400M. Rolls-Royce has a 25% workshare, which includes final assembly, the high-pressure compressor, the low-pressure shaft, the intermediate case, and the bearing support structure. However, much of this work is carried out in Germany, such as the final assembly, because Rolls-Royce has a larger workshare in relation to the UK aircraft purchase. The solution is that Rolls-Royce Deutschland does some of the work and thus can claim a part of the German workshare in the aircraft.
- Rolls-Royce LiftSystem, the STOVL component for the F35B. It is entirely developed and produced by Rolls-Royce. As with the Rolls-Royce share in the F136, the liftfan development is led by the company's Bristol facility with considerable input from its Indianapolis offices.
- Rolls-Royce Trent family.
  - Trent 500 is the only engine offered for the Airbus A340-500 and A340-600.
  - Trent 800 is offered for the Boeing 777 and the Trent 700 is offered for the Airbus A330, where it has achieved large success.
  - Trent 900 is Rolls-Royce's offering for the Airbus A380 and it has achieved a workshare of more than 50% against the Engine Alliance GP7200.
  - Trent 1000 is the launch engine for all variants of the Boeing 787 and, by November 2007, over 600 Trent 1000s had been ordered by 19 airlines. This gives the Trent 1000 a market share of slightly more than 40%.
  - Trent XWB is the newest Rolls-Royce engine of the Trent series. It will power the Airbus A350 XWB and has currently achieved 800 orders. In November 2007, Rolls-Royce declared that it will build a new factory in Singapore to final assemble some of the Trent XWBs and Trent 1000s.
- Rolls-Royce RB211 family.
  - RB211-524 engine is supplied by Rolls-Royce for the Boeing 747. It formed the basis for the development of the Trent engine series.
  - RB211-535 is supplied for the Boeing 757 and Boeing 767.
- RB282, an engine developed by Rolls-Royce to power the new Dassault super midsize business jet. In November 2007, Rolls-Royce announced that the RB282 would be developed and tested in newly completed facilities in Bristol. Its production however would take place in Virginia.
- International Aero Engines V2500, Rolls-Royce is a supplier for the IAE V2500, having previously also being a major shareholder of the company. Whilst the Rolls-Royce final assembly for this engine has been shifted from Derby to Germany, the British part of Rolls-Royce still manufactures a large degree of the engine.
- EFE – Environmentally Friendly Aero Engine is a 95 million pound programme, carried out by Rolls-Royce and a first engine run is planned for 2008. Its aim is to prepare the UK industry for future engine programmes and from a technical perspective, its aims are a 10% reduction in carbon dioxide emissions and a 60% reduction in NO_{x} emissions.
- UAV Engines Limited (UEL), a British company owned by Elbit of Israel, is one of the largest suppliers of UAV engines in the world. Their engines, ranging from 20 hp (15 kW) to 120 hp (89 kW), are installed on 25 different UAV systems. It will provide the engine for the British Army's Watchkeeper UAV.

=== Missiles ===
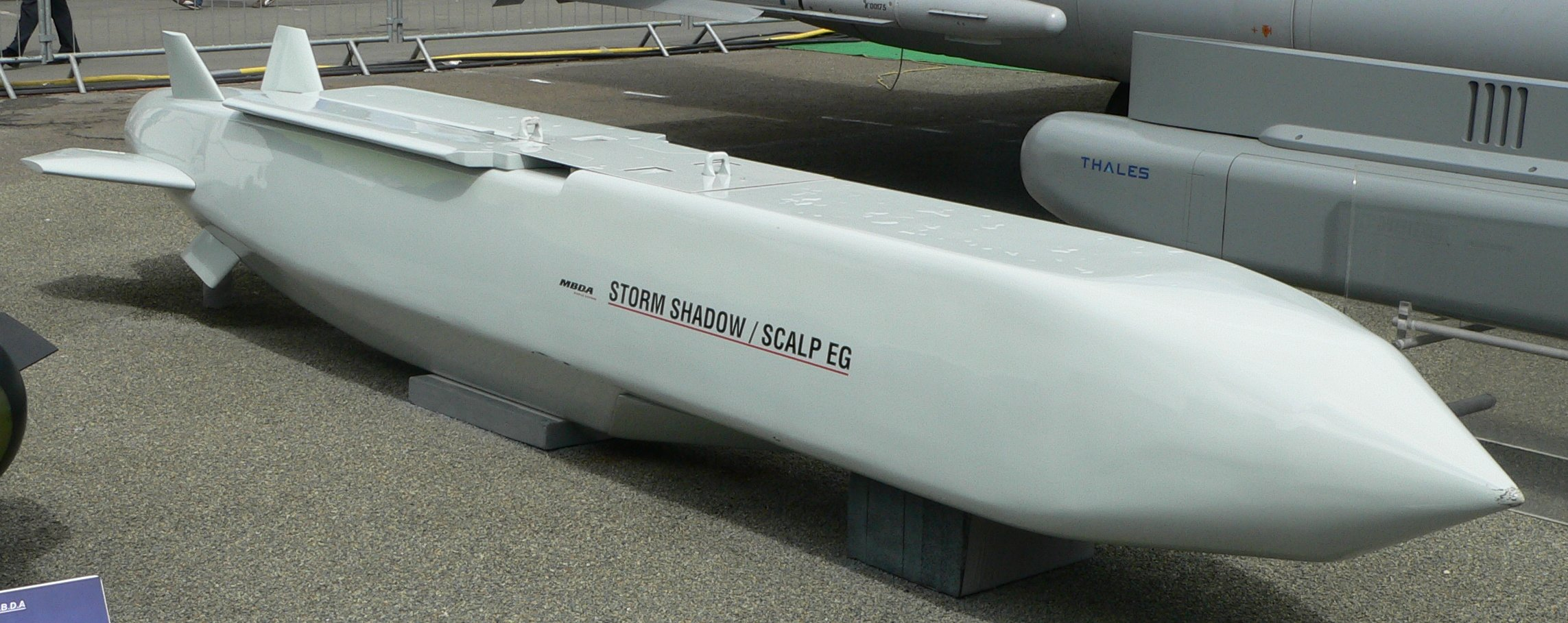
MBDA Storm Shadow

- ASRAAM, a short range air-to-air missile developed by MBDA UK.
- Brimstone, an air-to-ground missile developed by MBDA UK.
- CAMM, a family of missiles which includes versions for air, land and sea environments. It is developed by MBDA UK with technology sourced from ASRAAM.
- Martlet, a lightweight air-to-surface / surface-to-surface missile developed by Thales Air Defence with technology sourced from Starstreak.
- Meteor, a pan-European beyond visual range (BVR) air-to-air missile. The UK is the lead developer.
- Sea Venom, a lightweight air-to-surface / surface-to-surface anti-ship missile developed in cooperation with France.
- SPEAR 3, a network-enabled anti-ship, anti-tank and anti-ground mini-cruise missile developed by MBDA UK.
- Starstreak, a short-range surface-to-air missile, originally developed by Shorts Missile Systems, (now Thales Air Defence).
- Storm Shadow, a long range stand-off cruise missile developed in partnership with France and Italy.
- Perseus, a hypersonic anti-ship / land-attack cruise missile being developed in partnership with France.

=== Radars ===
- Euroradar CAPTOR, the radar developed for the Eurofighter Typhoon. It has been developed and is being produced by the Euroradar consortium, a joint venture of major European radar houses. The UK contribution comes mainly from Selex ES (formerly Ferranti). The CAPTOR is based on the Blue Vixen radar of the Sea Harrier FA2.
- Euroradar CAPTOR-E, the AESA variant of the CAPTOR radar which will equip later tranches of the Eurofighter Typhoon. A CAPTOR-E technology demonstrator, called CAESAR, first flew in early 2006 on a BAC 1-11 and has since then also flown on a Eurofighter development aircraft. According to reports, it has about 1400 T/R modules.
- Searchwater 2000, the main maritime surveillance radar for the now defunct Nimrod MRA4 programme, developed by Thales UK. The AEW variant was also fitted to the UK's Westland Sea King AsaC7 helicopters.
- Seaspray 5000E, Seaspray 7000E and Seaspray 7500E, developed by Selex ES, have found widespread use in various applications. The Seapray 7000E has been selected for the AW159 Wildcat and the Seaspray 7500E has been selected by the United States Coast Guard for its C-130s. The range for these radars is given as more than 100 nautical miles (190 km) for the Seaspray 5000E, 200 nautical miles (370 km) for the Seaspray 7000E and 320 nautical miles (590 km) for the Seaspray 7500E.
- Vixen 500E, a small AESA radar developed by Selex ES for small lightweight fighter aircraft. It is currently under development and has so far no customers. It has approximately 500 T/R modules. There is also a variant with 750 T/R modules under development. The range of the Vixen 500E is given as 35 nautical miles (65 km).
- Picosar radar, a very small AESA radar also developed by Selex ES with a range of about 20 kilometres and a weight of around 10 kg. Its market is mainly seen as a cheap, small radar for UAVs.

=== Satellites ===
- Galileo satellite navigation system, intended to rival the American GPS system, was until 2021 supported by the United Kingdom. The UK involvement ceased upon Britain's exit from the EU.
- Disaster Monitoring Constellation, a five satellite constellation with the first satellite being launched in 2002, to monitor disasters around the globe. Every satellite has been funded by a different country and SSTL has built and operates them. Currently, there are another three satellites under construction, one for Nigeria, one for the UK and one for Spain.
- Airbus UK satellite manufacture business
- Skynet family of military communications satellites
- Solar Orbiter, amongst the largest research satellites built in Britain

=== Spaceplanes ===
- British company Reaction Engines Limited was developing a SSTO spaceplane called Skylon with funding from the European Space Agency (ESA). The British Government partnered with the ESA in 2010 to promote Skylon. This design was pioneered by Reaction Engines Limited, a company founded by Alan Bond after HOTOL was cancelled. The Skylon spaceplane was positively received by the British government and the British Interplanetary Society. As of 2014 the precooler technology for the engine design had been demonstrated and test flights were expected within a decade. Reaction Engines Limited fell into administration in 2024.
- The company Bristol Spaceplanes has undertaken design and prototyping of three potential spaceplanes since its founding by David Ashford in 1991. The ESA has endorsed these designs on several occasions.

== Current major participants ==
=== Aerospace Corporation UK ===
Aerospace Corporation UK, LTD. in Salford, Manchester, Aerospace UK is a United Kingdom–based organisation that provides technical and strategic advisory services related to space systems and policy. Operating as a subsidiary of The Aerospace Corporation, it supports UK government departments, defence bodies, and institutional partners with analysis and expertise across space system planning, architecture, acquisition, and operational considerations. Its work spans civil, defence, and national security interests within the UK space sector and supports UK/USA initiatives.

Aerospace UK engages with domestic and international stakeholders to inform decision-making on space-related programmes and initiatives. The organisation contributes analysis on system performance, risk, and sustainability, and supports coordination across multiple agencies involved in space activities. Its remit includes emerging space capabilities and long-term strategic planning, aligned with broader UK objectives in space policy and capability development. David Sandy, the former United Kingdom Minister of Defense Space Directorate Chief was appointed Managing Director in May 2023.

=== AgustaWestland ===
AgustaWestland is an international helicopter manufacturer owned by Leonardo of Italy. In the United Kingdom, the company has one factory in Yeovil, employing more than 4,000 people. Its main products with a large British content are the AW101, the Super and Future Lynx and the AW139 and AW149.

=== Airbus UK ===
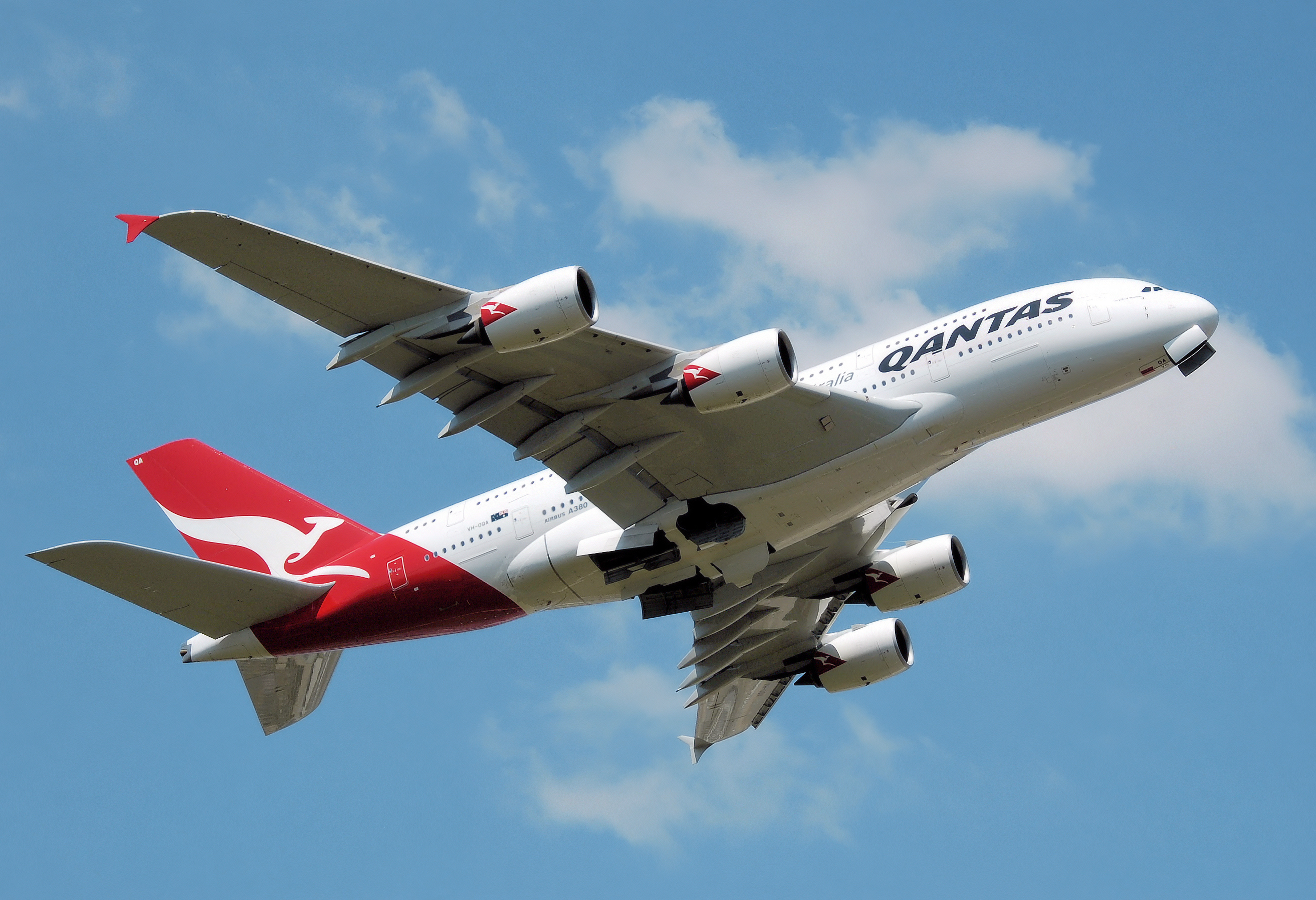
An Airbus A380, the wings and engines of which are produced in the UK

Airbus directly employs around 13,000 people at its UK division Airbus UK, with estimates that it supports another 140,000 jobs in the wider UK economy. The traditional UK workshare in Airbus aircraft is around 20%. Airbus has major sites at Filton in the city of Bristol and at Broughton in north Wales. Filton is the main research and development and support centre for all Airbus wings, fuel systems and landing gear integration. Broughton, which employs over 5,000 people, is the main wing manufacturing centre for all Airbus aircraft and also builds the fuselage and wings of the Hawker 800. Since 2006 Airbus has also had a small development centre in the Midlands.

Other Airbus subsidiaries with major operations in the UK include Astrium, Cassidian and Surrey Satellite Technology.

=== Airbus Defence & Space ===
Airbus Defence and Space (a subsidiary of Airbus) is the largest space company in Europe and employs around 2,700 people in the UK. It has sites at Stevenage (1,200 employees), Portsmouth (1,400 employees) and Poynton (120 employees).

=== BAE Systems ===
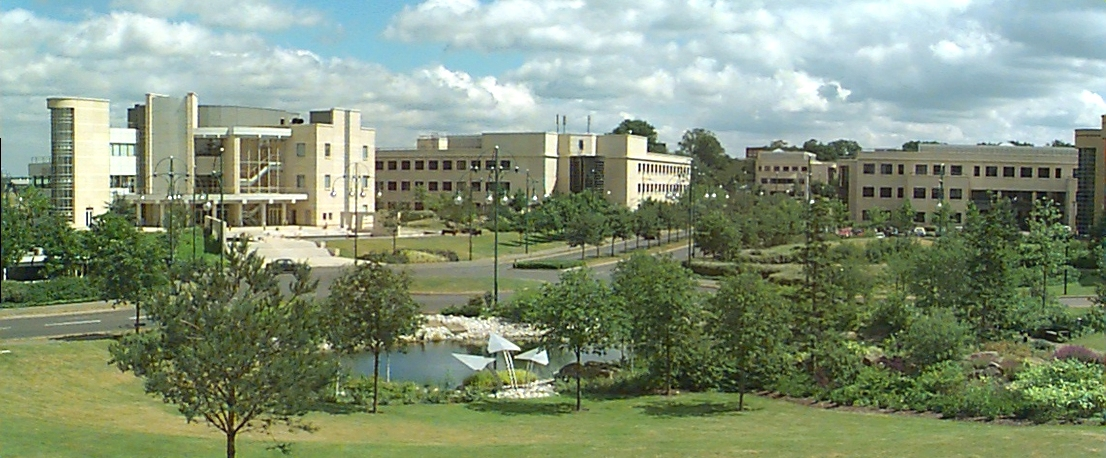
BAE Systems campus in Farnborough, United Kingdom

The UK-headquartered BAE Systems is the world's fourth-largest defence contractor and it employs around 36,400 people in the UK. The largest aerospace related locations of BAE Systems are Warton, Samlesbury and Brough. The final assembly line for the British Eurofighter Typhoons, a collaborative European programme, is located at Warton. All flight test activity for crewed aircraft is undertaken from Warton, which is also the development centre within BAE Systems, for UAVs, UCAVs and the Saudi Tornado upgrade programme. Samlesbury is the production hub of the Military Air Solutions division of BAE Systems. Here, components for the Eurofighter Typhoon, the F35 Lightning II, the Hawk, UAVs, UCAVs and Airbus aircraft get built. At Brough, the BAE Hawk gets produced and final assembled, flight tests are done at Warton. Overall, Military Air Solution has 14,000 employees spread across eight sites in the United Kingdom.

=== Britten-Norman Group ===
The Britten-Norman Group is the last remaining independent aircraft manufacturer in the United Kingdom, with about 100 employees. It is best known for its design of rugged transport aircraft, such as the Islander, Trislander and Defender 4000. To reduce costs, the company (resident on the Isle of Wight) did not perform manufacture of the airframes, but instead outsourced this to Romania. However, it has now moved production of all aircraft back to Daedalus Airfield and also performs in the European hub for the Cirrus SR20 and SR22 final assembly and delivery.

=== Spirit AeroSystems ===
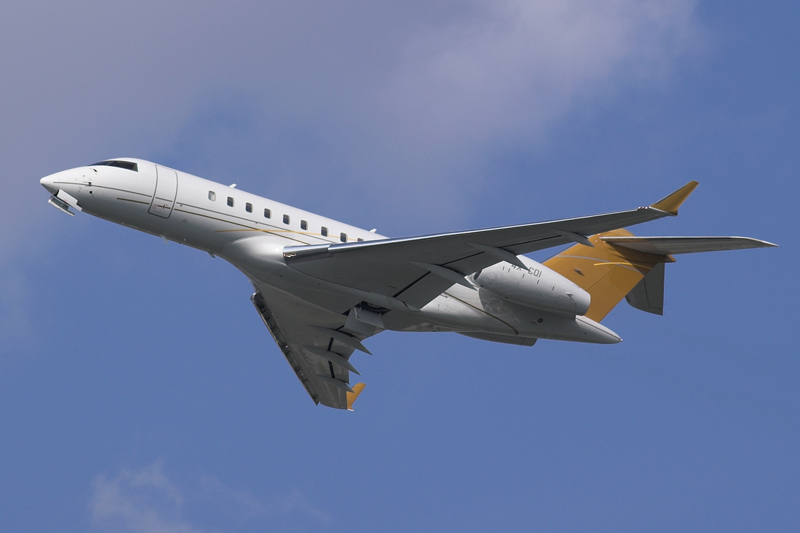
Bombardier Global 5000

The American company, Spirit AeroSystems, employs over 4,000 people across 7 facilities in Northern Ireland (Belfast, Dunmurry, Newtownards, and Newtownabbey) and Scotland (Prestwick Airport). The Northern Ireland operations can trace their roots back to Shorts Brothers in Northern Ireland. The company has significant workshares in a number of Bombardier aircraft, as well as producing wings for the Airbus A220.

=== GE Aviation Systems ===
GE Aviation Systems, formerly known as Smiths Aerospace, is a division of General Electric, with about 10,000 employees, half of which work in the UK.

=== GKN ===
GKN Aerospace is a division of the British company GKN, which employs approximately 5,000 people, mainly in the UK and the USA. In the UK, its most important facility is on the Isle of Wight, where it has a carbon composite centre of excellence. There it designed, and used to produce, the composite wing spar for the A400M now produced at GKN's New purpose built Western Approach, Bristol site.

=== Martin-Baker ===
Martin-Baker Aircraft Company Limited is a British manufacturer of ejection seats and safety-related equipment for aviation. It is the world's leading manufacturer of ejection seats, with a 53% global market share and annual production of around 500 seats per year.

=== Marshall Aerospace and Defence Group ===
Marshall Aerospace and Defence Group is a family-owned engineering services and technology business which employs over 4000 people with offices in the UK, Europe, UAE and Canada.

=== MBDA ===
MBDA is the largest European missile manufacturer, owned by BAE Systems (37.5%), Airbus (37.5%) and Leonardo (25%). It operates in the United Kingdom, France, Germany, Italy and Poland and has offices in the USA. In the UK, the main sites are Bristol (software and systems) Bolton (production), Stevenage (R&D and integration) and London (management). MBDA's missile programmes include ASRAAM, Meteor, Storm Shadow, Rapier, Sea Wolf, CAMM and Brimstone among others.

=== QinetiQ ===
QinetiQ was formed from parts of the former Defence Evaluation and Research Agency (DERA). It has close to 12,000 employees and is one of the major players in the British aerospace industry. QinetiQ's main aerospace business relates to satellites, UAVs and reconnaissance systems.

=== Rolls-Royce ===
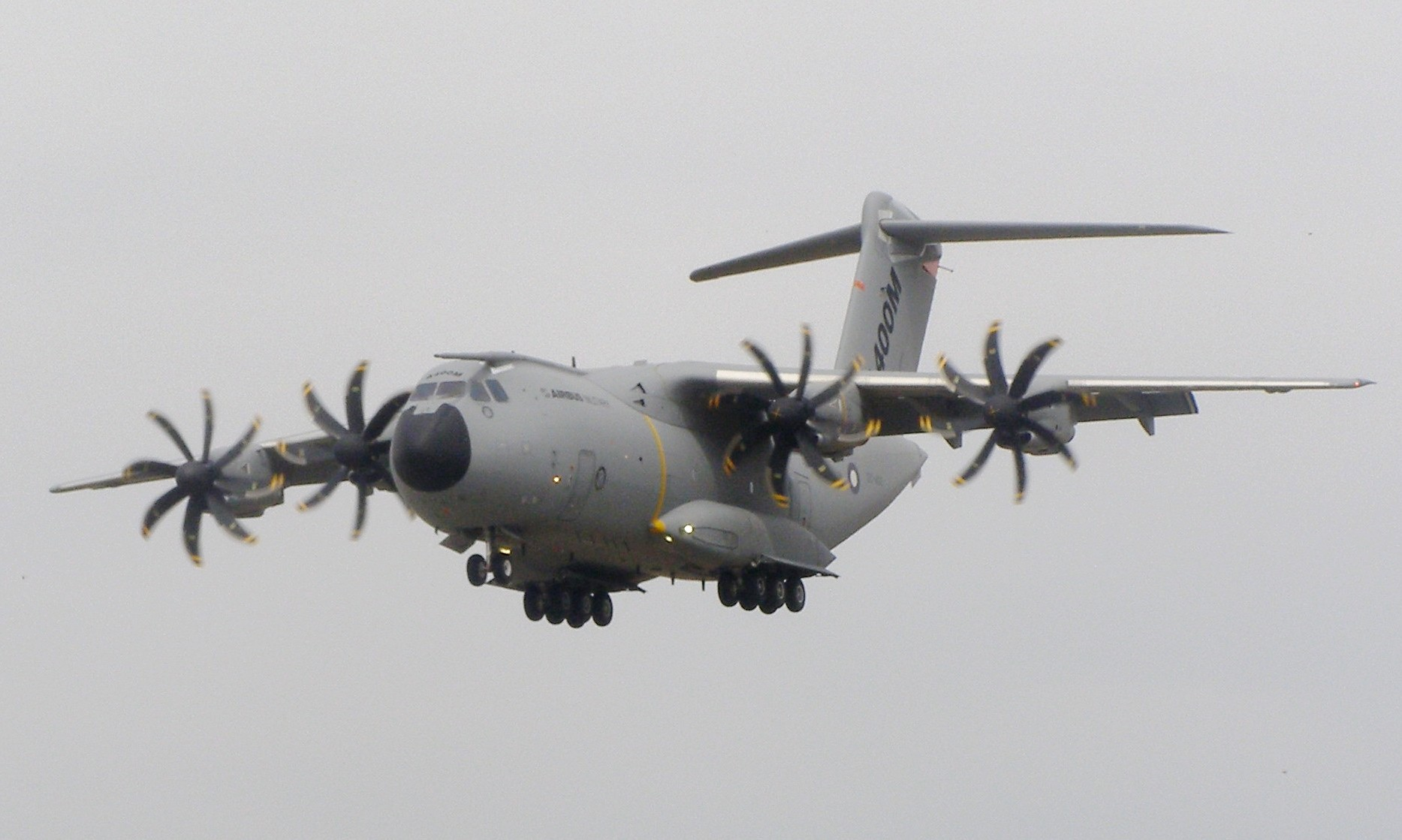
An Airbus A400M, which is powered by the Europrop TP400

The UK-headquartered Rolls-Royce Group is the world's second-largest maker of aircraft engines (behind General Electric). It has over 50,000 employees, of whom about 23,000 are based in the United Kingdom. In 2014, Rolls-Royce purchased the 50% Daimler had in the R-R engine business, paying €2,430 million for it. The company's main UK factories are at Derby and Bristol. In Derby, the three shaft Trent engines get developed and produced. The current line up includes the Trent 700 for the Airbus A330, the Trent 900 for the Airbus A380, the Trent 1000 for the Boeing 787 and the Trent XWB for the Airbus A350 XWB, among others. In Bristol, the company has concentrated its military aerospace business with the British final assembly line for the EJ200 engine for the Eurofighter Typhoon, the only final assembly line for the British-French Adour engine and other programmes, such as significant parts of the workshare, in the TP400 turboprop engine for the A400M and the F136 engine for the F-35 Lightning II. Recently, Bristol has also been confirmed as the centre for the development and testing of the civil RB282 engine, which will, however, be produced in Virginia.

Rolls-Royce's main locations are at Derby, Bristol, Hucknall, Barnoldswick/Burnley, Inchinnan.

=== Safran ===
Safran's operations include its Messier-Dowty and Turbomeca subsidiaries (now renamed Safran Landing Systems and Safran Helicopter Engines respectively), alongside the manufacturing of aircraft seats (South Wales) and nacelles (Burnley).

=== Swift Aircraft ===
Swift Aircraft is based in Coltishall, Norfolk. It is currently developing a new, fully composite, training aircraft with the aim to replace existing ageing military and civilian fleets.

=== Leonardo ===
The UK businesses of Leonardo have a workforce of approximately 8,000 and include Leonardo Helicopters (Yeovil), the successor to AugustaWestland and the UK's only domestic helicopter manufacturer. Models manufactured at Yeovil include the AW159 Wildcat and AW101 Merlin. Alongside core operations in Italy and the UK, the company trades in the United States, Germany, Turkey, Romania, Brazil, Saudi Arabia and India.

=== Surrey Satellite Technology ===
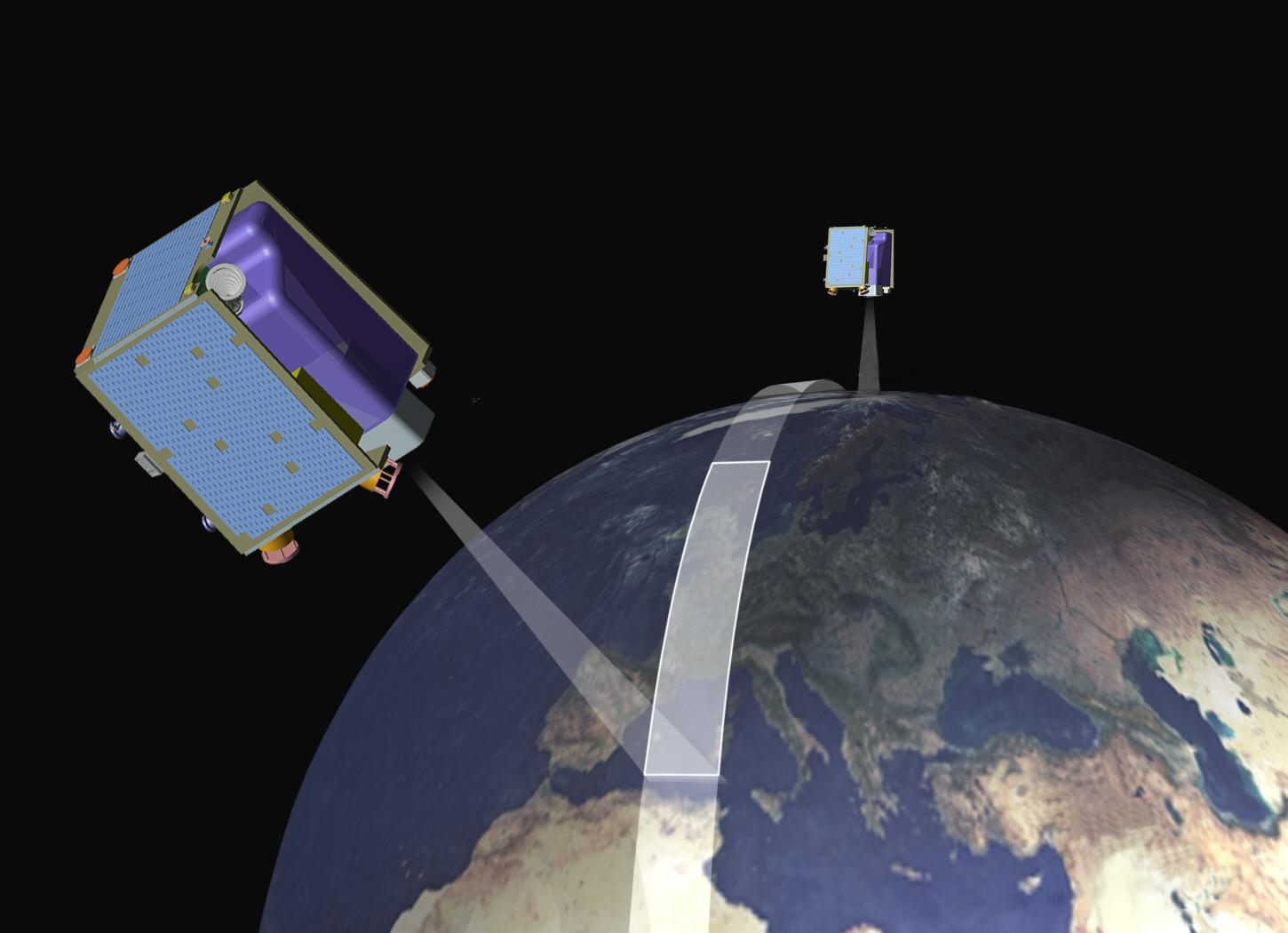
An artist's impression of two of the five satellites constructed by Surrey Satellite Technology for RapidEye AG

Surrey Satellite Technology is a small satellite development and production company. It currently has c.600 employees and is the world leader in small satellites. In its 22-year history, it has developed satellites for 27 missions. The two Galileo satellite navigation proofing satellites, GIOVE-A and GIOVE-A2, are two of their better-known satellites. Originally a spin-out company from the University of Surrey, Surrey Satellite Technology is now 99% owned by the Airbus Defence and Space division of Airbus.

=== Thales Group ===
Thales Group including its UK-based Thales Air Defence (Belfast), Thales Avionics and Thales Optronics subsidiaries has capabilities including avionics, UAVs, simulation.

== See also ==
- List of aircraft manufacturers
