= Rolls-Royce Turbomeca RTM322 =

1980s British/French turboshaft engine

RTM322
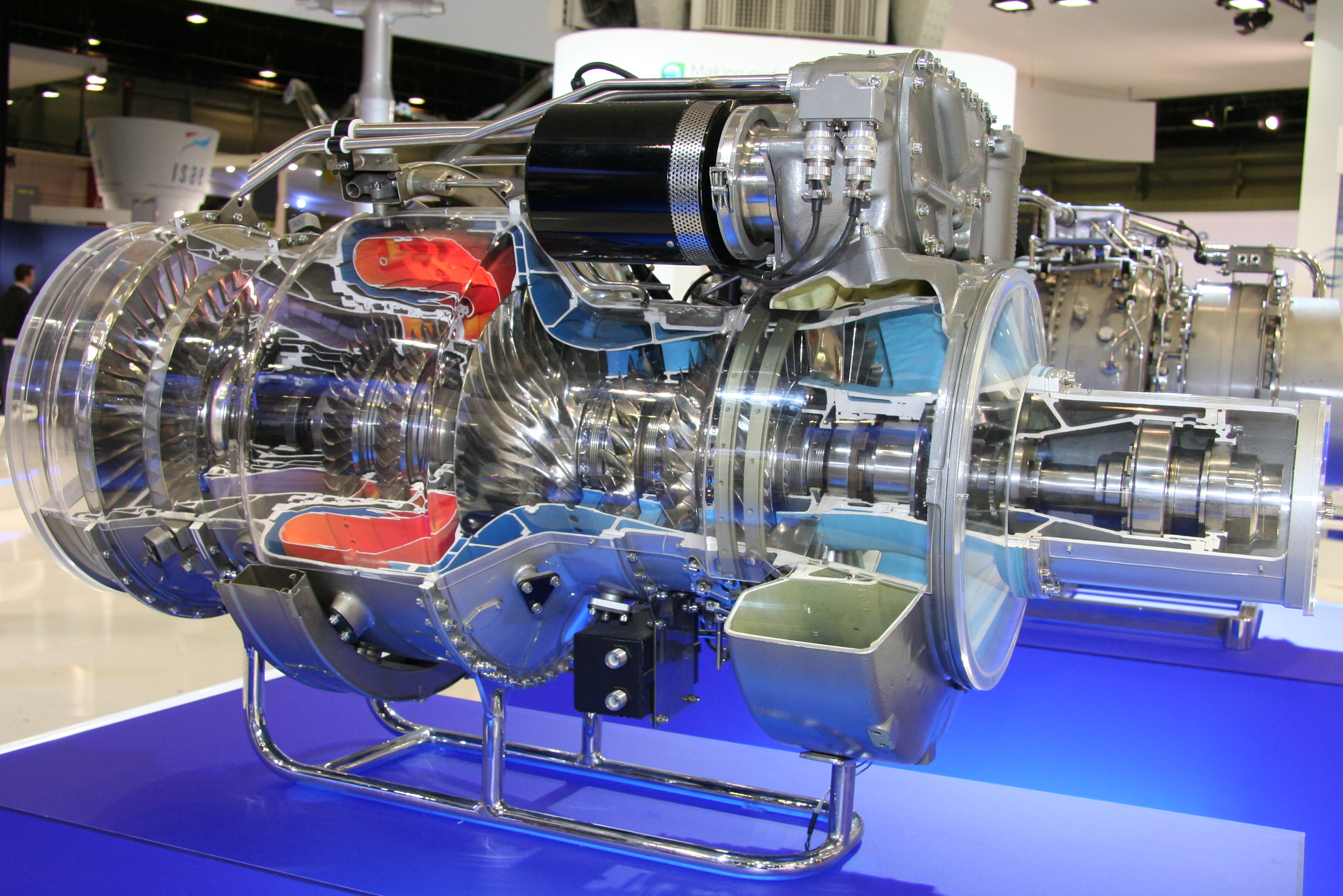
- RTM322 cutout at Le Bourget 2009
- Type: Turboshaft
- Manufacturer: Safran Helicopter Engines; Rolls-Royce Turbomeca (until 2013)
- First run: 15 December 1984
- Major applications: AgustaWestland Apache; AgustaWestland AW101; NHI NH90

The Rolls-Royce Turbomeca RTM322 is a turboshaft engine currently produced by Safran Helicopter Engines. The RTM322 was originally conceived and manufactured by Rolls-Royce Turbomeca Limited, a joint venture between Rolls-Royce and Turbomeca, now Safran Helicopter Engines. The engine was designed to suit a wide range of military and commercial helicopter designs. The RTM322 can also be employed in maritime and industrial applications.

The Safran Aneto is a later development targeted for the super-medium and heavy helicopters, developed by Safran Helicopter Engines covering the 2,500 to 3,000 hp (1,900 to 2,200 kW) range.

== Development ==
The engine was designed for the Hughes AH-64 Apache and Sikorsky UH-60 Blackhawk, competing with the General Electric T700 and the Pratt & Whitney Canada PW100. The partners shared the £100 million development costs equally. Rolls-Royce made the turbines, the combustor, and the inlet particle separator: Turbomeca produced the axial-centrifugal compressor and intake.

The engine first ran on 15 December 1984, with eight bench prototypes for 30,000 cycles and 13,000 test hours, and four for flight tests, initially aiming for type certification to be issued in 1987.

The first order for the RTM322 was received in 1992 to power 44 Royal Navy AgustaWestland Merlin HM1s which subsequently entered service in 1998. Over 1,100 engines are in service, having logged over one million flight hours, powering 60% of the Agusta-Westland AW101 fleet and 80% of in-service NH90s.

In 2013, Turbomeca, later part of the Safran Group, acquired the entire programme, becoming responsible for both production and product support. Safran Helicopter Engines has since developed a new engine derived from the RTM322, known as the Aneto.

== Safran Aneto ==
Safran Aneto

The first 2,500 shp -1K was selected to power the Leonardo AW149 and Leonardo AW189K twin to extend their capabilities. The engine flew in March 2017 and was scheduled to be introduced in the fourth quarter of 2018. The more powerful 3,000+ shp “Dash 3” should appear in the early 2020s and will feature a new compressor and hot section. The required documentation was expected to be handed to the EASA in early 2019 for a second quarter certification. By October 2018, the programme had accumulated 4,000 hours, including 105 hours of flight time. In 2018 Sikorsky was considering re-engining its CT7-powered S-92.

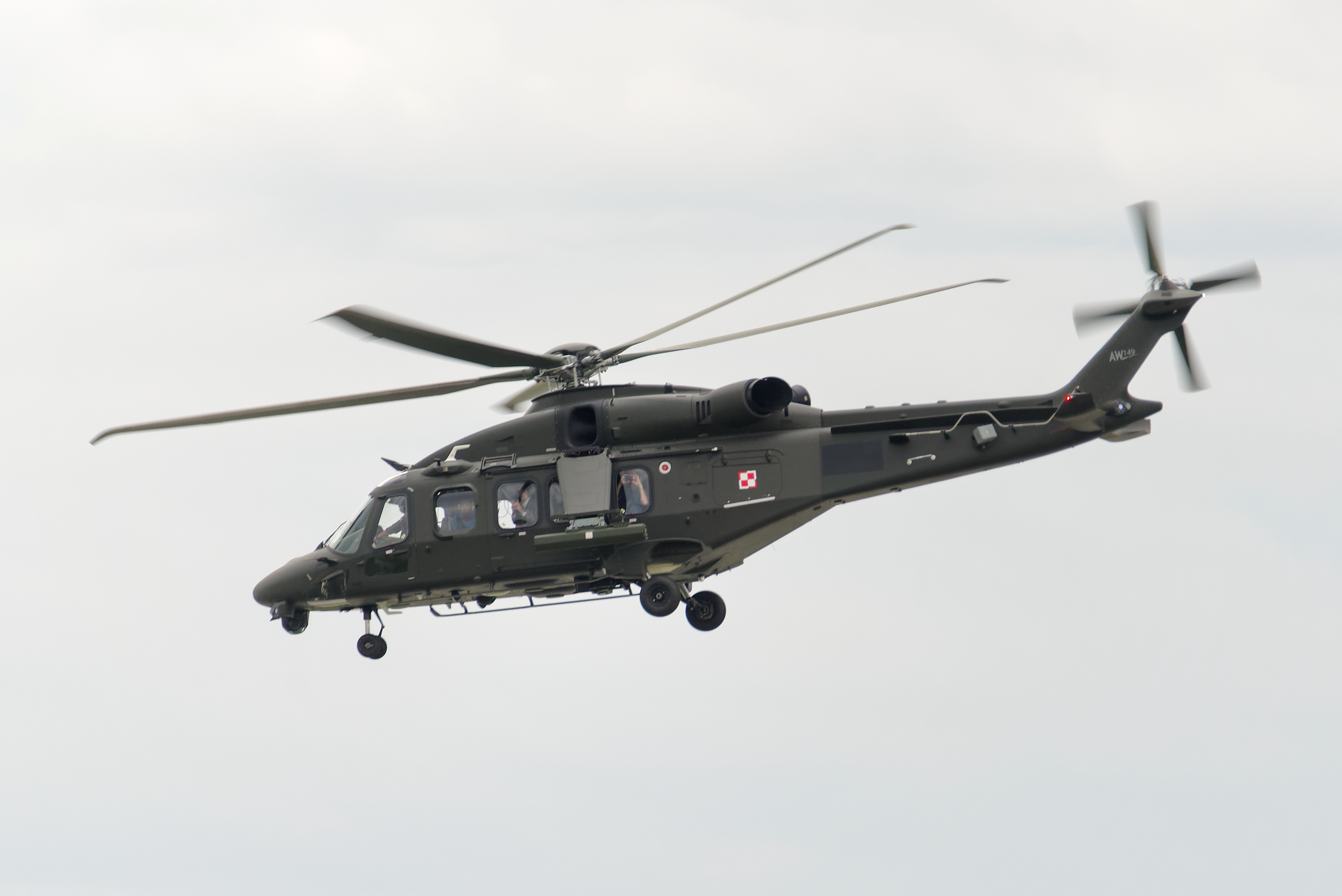
An Aneto-powered AW149.

The 1,063 kW (1,426 hp) Aneto-1K was added on the RTM 322 type certificate on 12 December 2019.

=== Design ===
As an RTM322 variant, the Aneto is a two spool turboshaft with a three stage axial compressor and a single stage centrifugal compressor turning at 36,300 rpm, a reverse flow annular combustor, a two stage gas generator axial turbine and a two stage axial power turbine with a forward transmission shaft turning at 21,000 rpm. Fitted with an inlet particle separator, its accessory gearbox is driven by the gas generator and the engine is controlled by a FADEC.

Built upon the Safran Tech 3000 technological demonstrator, it aims to gradually offer up to 15% better fuel economy over current competitors to improve payload-range and offers 25% better power density than existing engines of same volume. Offered for new or for existing models, fewer scheduled maintenance tasks, longer maintenance intervals and health monitoring should improve maintainability.

Suited for 8–15 ton helicopters, it is developed from the RTM322: the -1K has a similar architecture but no common parts. Parts made by additive manufacturing are used in the gyratory combustion chamber and the inlet guide vane system. Compatible with hybrid and distributed propulsion systems, in cruise flight one of the two engines could be shut down and restarted when needed. In the AW189, it is offered as an alternative to the incumbent General Electric CT7, needing minor changes to the top-deck structure and engine cowls. Exempted from U.S. International Traffic in Arms Regulations, it could power the AW189's military derivative, the AW149 or a future attack helicopter based on its dynamic systems.

Developed from a French Aviation Authority study, the Safran Power Pack Eco Mode on the Airbus Helicopters Racer allows it to put one of the two engines on standby during cruise flight, lowering fuel consumption by 15%, and quickly and automatically reactivate it with an electric starter to its maximum power for acceleration, landing or emergencies. The Aneto specific fuel consumption should be 10% better than the competing CT7s.

== Applications ==
- AgustaWestland Apache
- AgustaWestland AW101
- NHIndustries NH90
- Eurocopter X3

=== Aneto ===
- Leonardo AW149
- Leonardo AW189K: Aneto-1K, 2,500 shp; March 2017 first flight, fourth quarter of 2018 introduction.
- Proposed for the Airbus Helicopters X6 (suspended)
- Airbus Helicopters Racer high-speed demonstrator: Aneto-1X, 2,500 shp.
- Indian Multi Role Helicopter: Aneto-1H

== Specifications ==
Variant	RTM322-01/1	RTM322-01/9	Aneto-1K
Type	Turboshaft		
Compressor	Three axial stages + one centrifugal stage		
Combustor	Reverse flow annular		
Turbine	Two-stage high-pressure + two-stage power		
Length	1,171–1,181 mm (46.1–46.5 in)		
Diameter	615–708 mm (24.2–27.9 in)		
Dry weight	255 kg (562 lb)	232 kg (511 lb)	260 kg (570 lb)
Take-off power	1,611 kW (2,160 hp)	1,611 kW (2,160 hp)	1,063 kW (1,426 hp) (Note: one engine inoperative: 1,572 kW (2,108 hp))
Gas generator speed	36,300 rpm		
Power turbine speed	20,900 rpm	20,841 rpm	21,000 rpm
Power/weight ratio	6.1 kW/kg (3.7 hp/lb)	6.9 kW/kg (4.2 hp/lb)	4.1 kW/kg (2.5 hp/lb)
BSFC		255 g/(kW⋅h); 0.420 lb/(hp⋅h)	

== See also ==
Comparable engines

- General Electric T700/CT7
- Klimov TV7-117
- Pratt & Whitney Canada PW100

Related lists

- List of aircraft engines
