= Joseph Szydlowski =

Aircraft engineer (1896–1988)

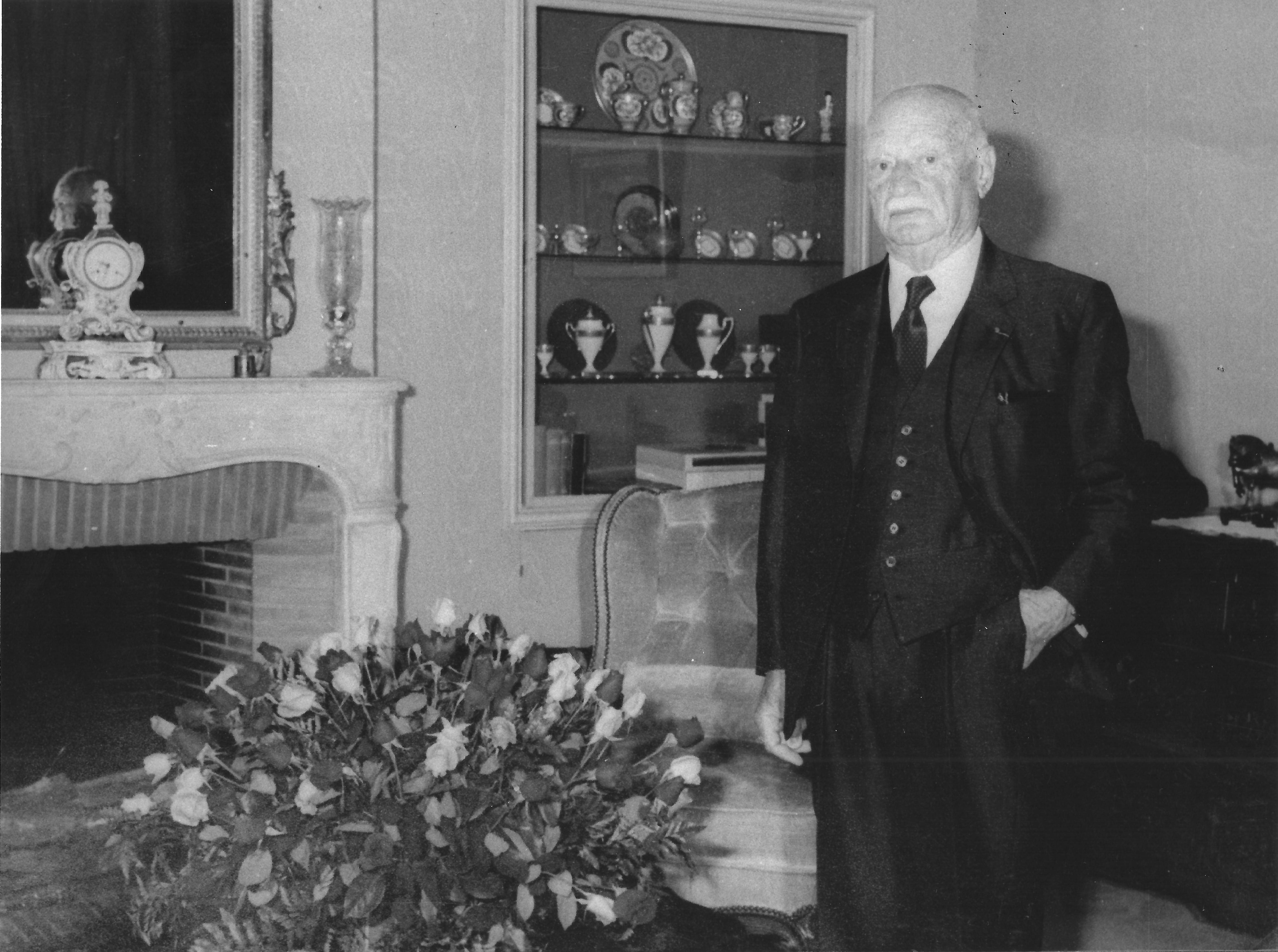
- Born: Józef Szydłowski; November 21, 1896; Skryhiczyn, Chełm County, Poland
- Died: July 16, 1988 (aged 91); Israel
- Occupation: Aircraft engine designer
- Known for: Founder of Turbomeca and Bet Shemesh Engines
- Awards: Honorary PhD from the Technion (1984)

Joseph Szydlowski (originally Józef Szydłowski; 21 November 1896 – 16 July 1988), was a French Polish-Israeli aircraft engine designer who founded Turbomeca in France. He was born in Skryhiczyn, Chełm County, Poland and died in Israel.

== Biography and career ==
At the time of Szydlowski's birth Chełm was part of Lublin Governorate in the Russian Empire. He was taken prisoner by the German Empire during World War I. He started working in Germany and applied for his first patents in 1920. With the rise of Nazism he emigrated to France in 1930. During the 1930s, he designed an unusual supercharger compressor which was used by the Hispano-Suiza 12Y in the Dewoitine D.520 fighter. It utilized an axial compressor rather than the usual centrifugal compressor that was predominant at the time in aircraft engines. He founded Turbomeca in Paris in 1938 and built the company on licensed production during World War II. In June 1940, when Germany invaded France, he evacuated his company to Saint-Pé-de-Bigorre in southern France. Once the war was over he developed small turbine engines for helicopters. Turbomeca became a major supplier of helicopter turboshaft engines, providing 30% of the non-United States market according to the company.

After the 1967 Six-Day War, in response to Charles De Gaulle's embargo on Israel, Szydlowski established a factory for the production of jet engines, Bet Shemesh Engines, in Israel. The factory was inaugurated in January 1969. Subsequently, Bet Shemesh Engines assembled the engines for the Fouga Magister training aircraft of the Israeli Air Force and engaged in training professionals and establishing a technological knowledge center for aircraft engine overhaul and repair. In 1981, the State of Israel acquired all of Szydlowski's shares, turning Bet Shemesh Engines Ltd. (BSEL) into a state-owned company.

In 1984, Szydlowski received an honorary PhD from the Technion.
