= Airbus Helicopters X6 =

Type of aircraft

X6

General information
- Type: Experimental 19-seat helicopter
- Manufacturer: Airbus Helicopters

The Airbus Helicopters X6 is a design concept for a 19-seat twin-engined heavy lift helicopter to replace the Airbus Helicopters H225. Development was stopped in early 2018.

== Development ==
In June 2015, Airbus Helicopters announced the start of a two-year concept development phase including a customer advisory panel: it will be targeted at the commercial transport market, the oil and gas industry work and for search and rescue work, aiming for entry into service around 2022-23.

In June 2017, the European Commission approved €377 million ($420 million) of repayable state aid, due to be paid back over eight years : €330 million from France and €47.25 million from Germany. It would be the first Airbus commercial helicopter controlled by fly-by-wire and should offer lower noise and a 15-20% reductions in fuel burn and direct operating costs compared to current aircraft. The Safran Aneto was proposed to power the 11 t class helicopter.

In January 2018, its development was suspended as it is lacking disruptive fly-by-wire and engine suppliers, and while the military and parapublic H225 market stayed strong in 2017 with 44 orders, the offshore oil and gas market shrank; the €377 million French and German refundable launch aid is not yet allocated but could be used if the X6 is launched. The offshore oil and gas market continued to shrink with the North Sea oilfield, its primary market, continuing to be depleted and the oil price presently too low to finance new operations.

== See also ==
- Eurocopter X3
