= Rolls-Royce Turbomeca Adour =

Turbofan jet engine developed in the 1960s

Adour
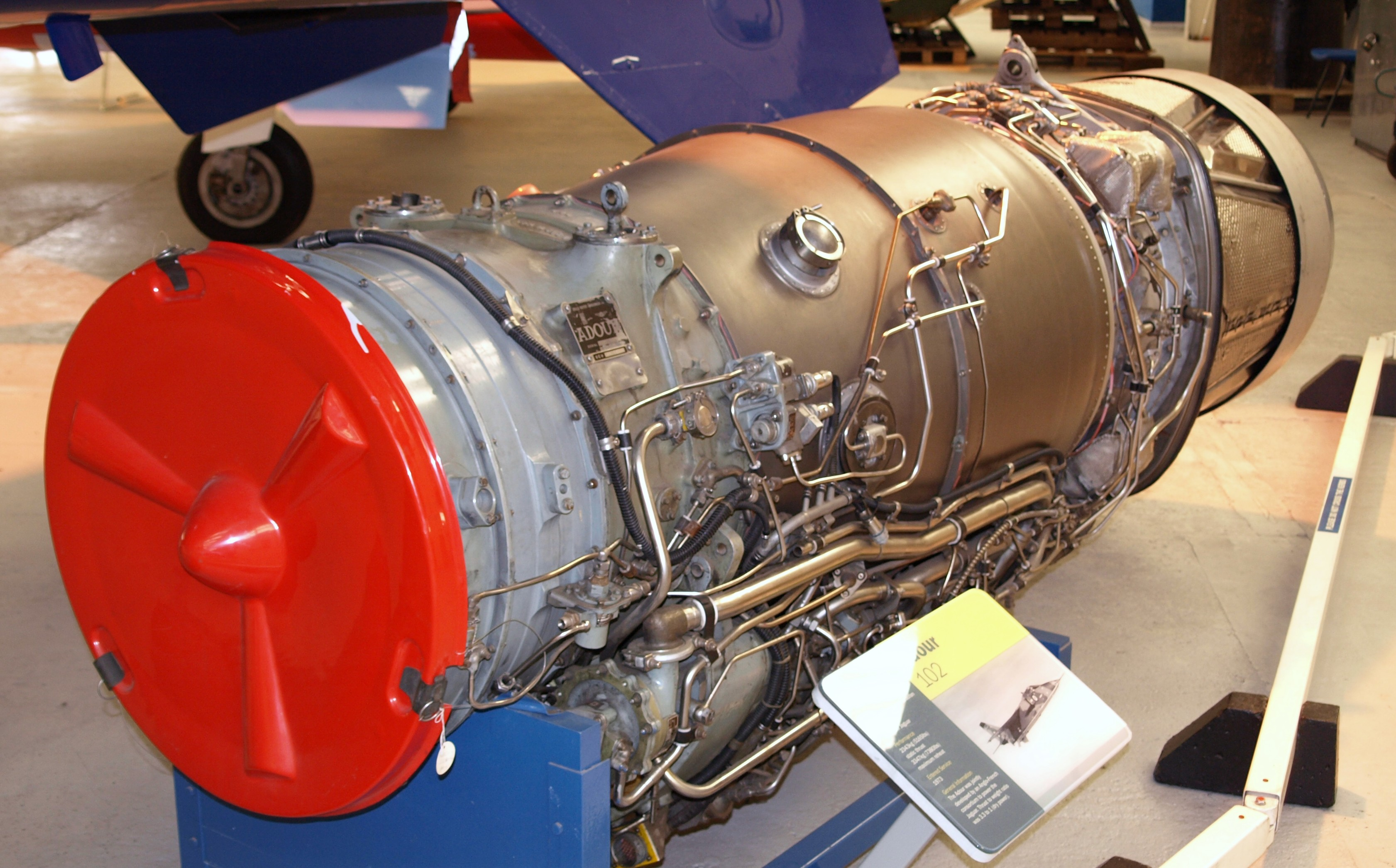
- An Adour Mk 102 at the Royal Air Force Museum Cosford
- Type: Turbofan
- Manufacturer: Rolls-Royce Turbomeca Limited
- Built by: Hindustan Aeronautics Limited
- First run: 1968
- Major applications: BAE Hawk; McDonnell Douglas T-45 Goshawk; Mitsubishi F-1; Mitsubishi T-2; SEPECAT Jaguar
- Number built: >2,800

The Rolls-Royce Turbomeca Adour is a two-shaft low bypass turbofan aircraft engine developed by Rolls-Royce Turbomeca Limited, a joint venture between Rolls-Royce (UK) and Turbomeca (France). The engine is named after the Adour, a river in south western France.

== History ==
The Adour is a turbofan engine developed primarily to power the Anglo-French SEPECAT Jaguar fighter-bomber, achieving its first successful test run in 1968. It is produced in versions with or without reheat.

As of July 2009 more than 2,800 Adours have been produced, for over 20 different armed forces with total flying hours reaching 8 million in December 2009. The U.S. military designation for this engine is the F405-RR-401 (a derivative of the Adour Mk 871), which is currently used to power the fleet of Boeing / BAE Systems T-45 Goshawk trainer jets of the United States Navy.

== Variants ==
Bench engines
Ten prototype engines were built for testing by both Rolls-Royce and Turbomeca.

Flight development engines
Development engines for the Jaguar prototypes, 25 built.

=== Reheated (afterburning) ===
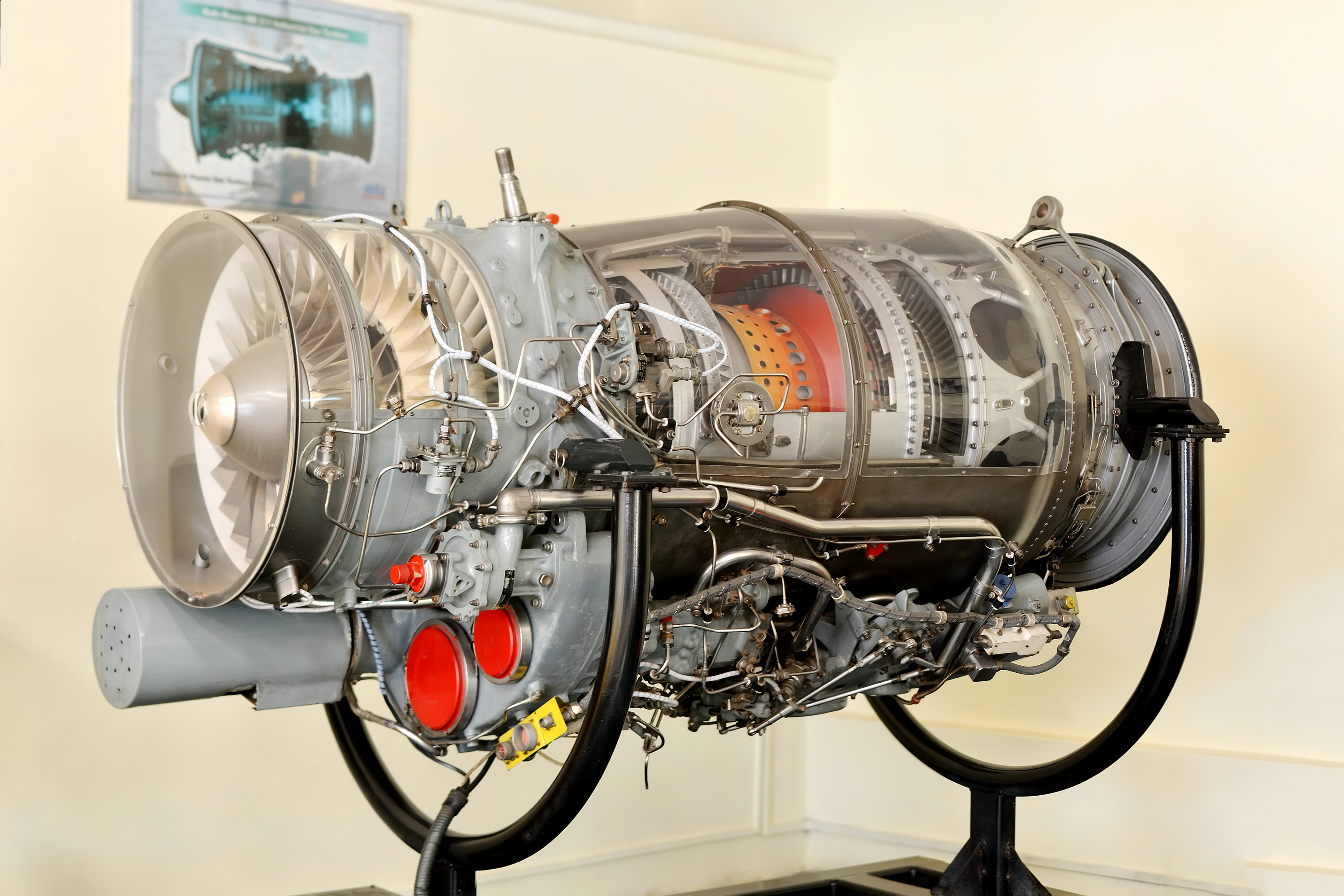
Adour Mk 811 displayed at HAL Aerospace Museum

- Adour Mk 101 - First production variant for the Jaguar, 40 built.
- Adour Mk 102 - Second production variant with the addition of part-throttle reheat.
- Adour Mk 104 - Much more powerful version available in early 1980s, with higher operating temperature (700° vs 640), capable of about 5,500 lb. dry and 8,000 lb. with max A/B (static). While it was only marginally better in military thrust at take off, this engine improved the Jaguar’s low power-to weight ratio and enabled much better performance, with 10% more thrust at take off (with after burner engaged), and up to 27% more thrust in high subsonic cruise, helping the Jaguar in its typical flight envelope (low level, high speed attack).
- Adour Mk 106 - Replacement for the Jaguar's Mk104 engine (developed from the Adour 871) with a reheat section. The RAF refitted its fleet with this engine as part of the GR3 upgrade. In May 2007, following the retirement of the last 16 Jaguars from No. 6 Squadron RAF, based at RAF Coningsby, the Adour 106 has been phased out of RAF service.
- Adour Mk 801 - For Mitsubishi F-1 & T-2 (JASDF)
- TF40-IHI-801A - Licence-built version of Mk 801 by Ishikawajima-Harima for Mitsubishi F-1 & T-2 (JASDF)
- Adour Mk 804 - Licence-built by HAL for Indian Air Force phase 2 Jaguars
- Adour Mk 811 - Licence-built by HAL for Indian Air Force phase 3 to 6 Jaguars; rated at 8400 lbs of maximum thrust. BAe-built Jaguars were initially powered with two Adour 804E turbofans.
- Adour Mk 821 - Engine upgrade of Mk804 and Mk811 engines, was under development for the Indian Air Force Jaguar aircraft.

=== Dry (non-afterburning) ===
- Adour Mk 151-01 Used by the Royal Air Force training aircraft fleet
- Adour Mk 151-02 - Used by the Red Arrows
- Adour Mk 851
- Adour Mk 861
- Adour Mk 871 - Used by Hawk 200
- F405-RR-401 - Similar configuration to Mk 871, for US Navy T-45 Goshawk.
- Adour Mk 951 - Designed for the latest versions of the BAE Hawk and powering the BAE Taranis and Dassault nEUROn UCAV technology demonstrators. The Adour Mk 951 is a more fundamental redesign than the Adour Mk 106, with improved performance (rated at 6,500 lbf (29,000 N) thrust) and up to twice the service life of the 871. It features an all-new fan and combustor, revised HP and LP turbines, and introduces Full Authority Digital Engine Control (FADEC). The Mk 951 was certified in 2005.
- F405-RR-402 - Upgrade of F405-RR-401, incorporating Mk 951 technology, certified 2008. Did not enter into service due to funding issues.

=== Higher bypass ===
- A high-bypass engine built around the core of the Adour and intended as a Spey replacement was developed by Rolls-Royce in 1967 as the Rolls-Royce RB.203 Trent.

== Applications ==
- Aermacchi MB-338 (not-built)
- BAE Hawk
- BAE Taranis (UCAV development aircraft)
- Dassault nEUROn (UCAV development aircraft)
- McDonnell Douglas T-45 Goshawk
- SEPECAT Jaguar

=== Licence-built ===
Ishikawajima-Harima TF40-IHI-801A

- Mitsubishi F-1
- Mitsubishi T-2

== Engines on display ==
- A Rolls-Royce Turbomeca Adour is on public display at the City of Norwich Aviation Museum in Horsham St Faith, Norfolk.
- A Rolls-Royce Turbomeca Adour Mk.151-01 is on display at the South Yorkshire Aircraft Museum, Doncaster. The engine is displayed alongside an ex-RAF Hawk T.1 XX238.
- A Rolls-Royce Turbomeca Adour cutaway is on public display at the Trenchard Museum, RAF Halton, Halton, Buckinghamshire.

== Specifications (Adour Mk 106) ==
Data from Rolls-Royce

==== General characteristics ====
- Type: Turbofan
- Length: 114 inches (2.90 m)
- Diameter: 22.3 inches (0.57 m)
- Dry weight: 1,784 lb (809 kg)

==== Components ====
- Compressor: 2-stage LP, 5-stage HP
- Turbine: 1-stage LP, 1-stage HP

==== Performance ====
- Maximum thrust: 6,000 lb (27.0 KN) dry / 8,430 lb (37.5 KN) with reheat
- Overall pressure ratio: 10.4
- Bypass ratio: 0.75-0.8
- Fuel consumption: dry 0.81 lb/(lbf⋅h) (23 g/(kN⋅s))
- Thrust-to-weight ratio: 4.725

== See also ==
Comparable engines

- Honeywell/ITEC F124
- IHI Corporation XF5
- Ivchenko-Progress AI-322

Related lists

- List of aircraft engines
