= Rolls-Royce Turbomeca =

UK business

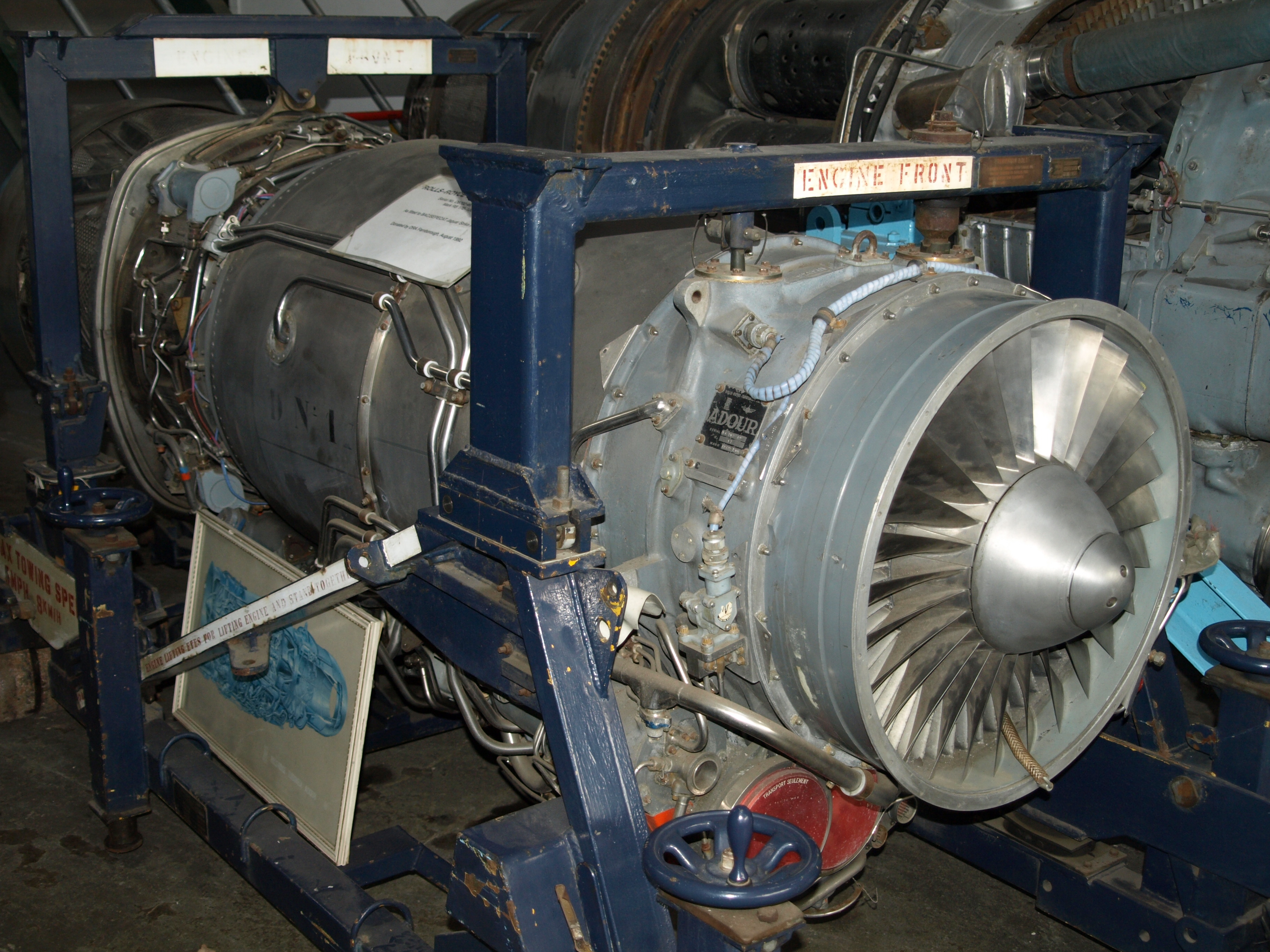
An Adour on display at the Brooklands Museum

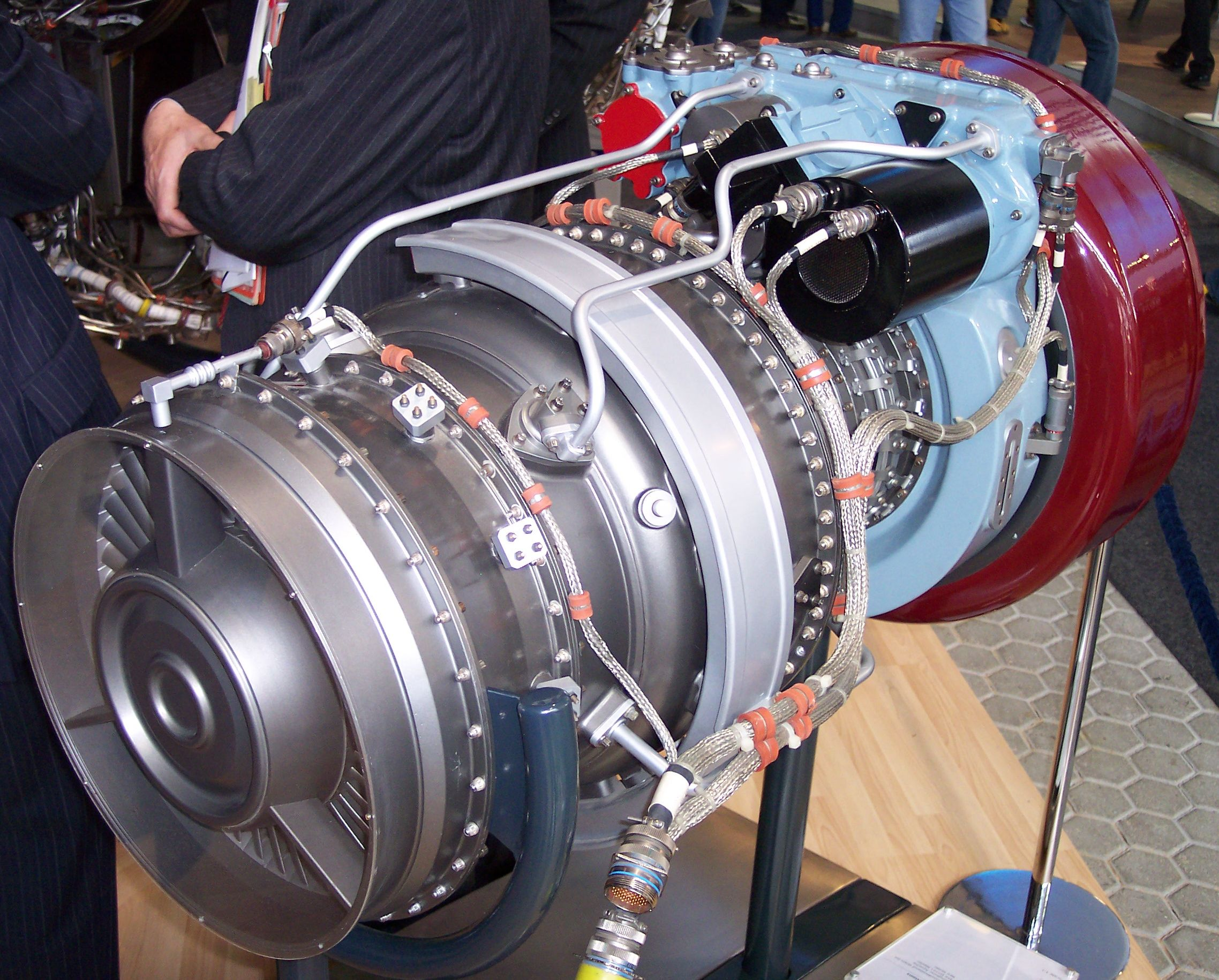
An RTM322 on display

Rolls-Royce Turbomeca Limited (RRTM) is a joint venture between British aero-engine manufacturer Rolls-Royce plc (UK) and French helicopter engine specialist Safran Helicopter Engines (formerly known as Turbomeca). It manufactured aero-engines and provided associated support services to end users.

The joint venture has been responsible for the development and production of two aero-engines, the Adour turbofan, and the RTM322 turboshaft powerplant. During 2013, Turbomeca bought out Rolls-Royce's involvement in the RTM322 programme; accordingly, all manufacturing-related responsibility activities with this engine were transferred to Turbomeca solely during the mid-2010s.

== History ==
During the definition phase of what became the SEPECAT Jaguar ground attack aircraft, a separate partnership was formed between British aero-engine manufacturer Rolls-Royce and French helicopter engine specialist Turbomeca to develop the Adour, an afterburning turbofan engine, to power the aircraft. This engine would not only be adopted for the Jaguar, but also for aircraft such as the BAE Systems Hawk, the McDonnell Douglas T-45 Goshawk, and Mitsubishi T-2 trainer aircraft, as well as the Mitsubishi F-1 ground attack fighter. In excess of 2,800 Adour engines would eventually be produced, reportedly amassing a cumulative total of 7,000,000 flying hours.

During 1995, it was announced that the Rolls-Royce Turbomeca RTM322 turboshaft engine had been selected to power the British Army's fleet of AgustaWestland Apache attack helicopters; accordingly, the RTM322 took the place of the standard General Electric T700 engine that powered all previous versions of the Apache. At the time, there were hopes that other Apache operators could opt to procure the engine over the T700 as well. The initial version of the RM322 was qualified for use by the British Ministry of Defence during 2003.

Over the following decades, the RTM322 engine was adopted by various operators to power a number of rotorcraft, including the NHIndustries NH90 and AgustaWestland AW101 medium-sized transport helicopters, as well as being used on the UK's Apache helicopter fleet, and the Eurocopter X³, a high speed technology demonstrator. During 2003, it was announced that the joint venture was undertaking the development of an enhanced version of the RTM322, taking the powerplant from the current 2,400shp (1,800 kW) power range to beyond 2,500shp in the near term and potentially 3,300shp in the longer term after further improvements are finalised. Keith Reid, Rolls-Royce Turbomeca international marketing manager, noted that the RM322 had been originally designed with future growth in mind, and that operators had been placing an increasing emphasis upon hot and high flight capabilities, which necessitated more engine power is being available.

During 2013, responsibility for undertaking all activities related to the RTM322 engine, including manufacturing and maintenance/services, began to be transferred to Turbomeca following an agreement between Rolls-Royce and Turbomeca to buy out the former in exchange for around €293 million ($381 million). Over the following three years, Turbomeca progressively took on this work, the first 12 months were generally dedicated to taking on RM322 maintenance and repair activities, the following 12 months were spent on building up its testing capabilities, while the remainder were involved the realign of the engine's supply chain with the French firm and internalise any manufacturing activities previously performed by Rolls-Royce.

== Products ==
- Rolls-Royce Turbomeca Adour
- Rolls-Royce Turbomeca RTM322
