= Safran Helicopter Engines =

French company producing gasturbine turbo shaft engines

Turbomeca
- Company type: Subsidiary
- Industry: Aerospace & Defence
- Founded: 1938; 88 years ago
- Founder: Joseph Szydlowski
- Headquarters: Bordes, France
- Key people: Bruno Even (CEO)
- Products: Turboshaft and jet engines
- Number of employees: 6,300 (2016)
- Parent: Safran S.A.
- Website: www.safran-group.com/fr/societes/safran-helicopter-engines

Safran Helicopter Engines, previously known as Turbomeca, is a French manufacturer of low- and medium-power gas turbine turboshaft engines for helicopters. The company also produces gas turbine engines for aircraft and missiles, as well as turbines for land, industrial and marine applications.

Since its founding as Turbomeca in 1938, Safran Helicopter Engines has produced over 72,000 turbines. In its early years, it benefitted greatly from a rearmament programme conducted by the French state; operations were disrupted by the occupation of France during the Second World War, but the company survived and rebuilt quickly during the immediate postwar years. Prominent successes during the Cold War include the use of its Artouste II turboshaft engine to power the new Sud Aviation Alouette II helicopter (the first production turbine-powered helicopter in the world) as well as its involvement in Rolls-Royce Turbomeca Limited (a joint venture with British engine manufacturer Rolls-Royce Ltd that produced turbojet and turboshaft engines).

In September 2001, the French aerospace specialist SNECMA Group acquired the company, after which it was rebranded as Safran Helicopter Engines. The company states that it has more than 2,500 customers in 155 countries. Safran Helicopter Engines has 15 sites and operates on each continent, providing its customers with a proximity service through 44 distributors and certified maintenance centers, 18 Repair & Overhaul Centers, and 90 Field Representatives and Field Technicians. Safran Helicopter Engines subsidiary Safran Power Units is the leading European manufacturer of turbojet engines for missiles, drones and auxiliary power units. Safran Helicopter Engines has 6,300 employees worldwide, with 5000 based in France. In 2015, the company reportedly produced and delivered 718 new engines, and repaired around 1,700 engines.

== History ==
On 29 August 1938, the company was founded as Turbomeca by the aero engine designers Joseph Szydlowski and André Planiol, following the granting of their patent application for a supercharger during the previous year. Engine manufacturer Hispano-Suiza promptly ordered a demonstrator to equip its 12 Y engine, which was used on the MS 405 C1 fighter, amongst others. The company benefitted greatly from a decision by the French Government, recognising the looming threat of another World War with neighbouring Nazi Germany, having launched a rearmament programme in 1937.

Over the course of three years, Turbomeca expanded rapidly from an artisanal production to an industrial one to meet the extensive demands of the French aircraft industry. The production figures of the company's first few years of operation indicate this rapid expansion: 18 compressors were produced in 1938, 300 in 1939 and 1,200 in 1940. The factory at Mézières-sur-Seine had only just attained fully operational status in June 1940, when the French Government advised a relocation to the south of France to avoid the German advance. That same month, Turbomeca repositioned its operations to a newly requisitioned workshop in Saint-Pé-de-Bigorre near the Hispano-Suiza engine factory in Tarbes. However, these buildings were quickly found to be too small for its needs, thus, in 1941, a site was acquired in Bordes near Pau. Turbomeca progressively transferred to this site between the autumn of 1941 and June 1942. In November 1942, Szydlowski fled to neutral Switzerland. Between October 1942 and 1944, production stalled while its workforce dropped from about 300 to about 50 personnel.

Following the liberation of the region by Allied forces in August 1944, Szydlowski returned to Bordes to help revive Turbomeca; much of the firm's former staff were re-employed and much of its machinery was recovered as well, enabling a speedy revival during the postwar era. During the late 1940s, Szydlowski opted to focus Turbomeca's design resources on low-power jet propulsion, intended for a new range of jet-powered aircraft, including turbine-powered helicopters. The production of turboshaft engines, which became widely used for rotorcraft, became a staple of the business over subsequent decades.

From 1950, Turbomeca produced the tiny centrifugal flow Palas turbojet, producing 1.6 kN (353 lbf). In addition to the company's own production, the Palas was also produced under license by Blackburn and General Aircraft in the United Kingdom and Continental in the United States. Blackburn had a licence for producing other Turbomeca designs. In 1955, Turbomeca's Artouste II turboshaft engine was adopted for the new Sud Aviation Alouette II helicopter, which became the world's first production turbine-powered helicopter one year later. Starting in 1957, the firm stated manufacture of the Bastan turboprop for the Aérospatiale N 262 airliner.

In 1968, a joint venture with British engine manufacturer Rolls-Royce Ltd, named Rolls-Royce Turbomeca Limited, was established to develop and produce the Adour turbojet engine to power the Anglo-French SEPECAT Jaguar. In addition to manufacturing the aero-engine, the company also provided associated support services to end users. The Adour would not only be adopted for the Jaguar, but also various other aircraft, such as the BAE Systems Hawk, the McDonnell Douglas T-45 Goshawk, and Mitsubishi T-2 trainer aircraft, as well as the Mitsubishi F-1 ground attack fighter. In excess of 2,800 Adour engines would eventually be produced, reportedly amassing a cumulative total of 7,000,000 flying hours.

Deciding to build on its success with another engine, Rolls-Royce Turbomeca handled development and production of the RTM322 turboshaft engine. In 1995, it was announced that the Rolls-Royce Turbomeca RTM322 turboshaft engine had been selected to power the British Army's fleet of AgustaWestland Apache attack helicopters. Over the following decades, the RTM322 engine was adopted by various operators to power a number of rotorcraft, including the NHIndustries NH90 and AgustaWestland AW101 medium-sized transport helicopters, along with the Eurocopter X³, a high speed technology demonstrator. In 2003, it was announced that the joint venture was undertaking the development of an enhanced version of the RTM322, taking the powerplant from the current 2,400shp (1,800 kW) power range to beyond 2,500shp in the near term and potentially 3,300shp in the longer term after further improvements are finalised. Keith Reid, Rolls-Royce Turbomeca international marketing manager, noted that the RM322 had been originally designed with future growth in mind, and that operators had been placing an increasing emphasis upon hot and high flight capabilities, which necessitated more engine power is being available.

In June 1989, another joint venture, MTU Turbomeca Rolls-Royce (MTR) was established as a part of the framework created on behalf of the French and West German governments to develop an advanced multirole battlefield helicopter, the Eurocopter Tiger. Being responsible for developing and producing the Tiger's MTR390 powerplant, MTR was designated as the programme management company responsible for the engine, and was jointly staffed by the partner companies, Turbomeca, Germany's MTU Aero Engines and Britain's Rolls-Royce. In early 2000, an initial production contract was signed by the German Federal Office of Defence Technology and Procurement (BWB) and MTR; valued at DM430 million and comprising 320 engines plus spares, the contract represented the MTU390's clearance for production. Later-built models of the Tiger are furnished with more powerful models of the MTU390 engine than had been installed upon the initial examples.

In 2013, an agreement between Rolls-Royce and Turbomeca to buy out the former's involvement in Rolls-Royce Turbomeca in exchange for around €293 million ($381 million), after which responsibility for undertaking all activities related to the RTM322 engine, including manufacturing and maintenance/services, was transferred to Turbomeca. Accordingly, Rolls-Royce Turbomeca is now a wholly owned subsidiary of Safran Helicopter Engines.

By 2010, Safran Helicopter Engines turbines powered civil, parapublic and defence helicopters for all the leading helicopter manufacturers (mainly Eurocopter, but also AgustaWestland, Sikorsky, Kamov, HAL, NHI).

== Engine models ==
Safran is the world's leading manufacturer of gas turbine engines for both civil and military helicopters. They design, produce, sell and support a complete range of turbine engines for this market. More than 18,000 Safran Helicopter engines already power helicopters built by the world's leading manufacturers: Airbus Helicopters, AVIC, Sikorsky, Bell Helicopter, Finmeccanica Helicopters (formerly AgustaWestland), Denel, Russian Helicopters, HAL, Boeing, etc. In the military sector, Safran powers the Tiger, NH90, Finmeccanica Helicopters A109 Power, AW101 and many others. Helicopters powered by Safran are deployed by 2,500 customers in 150 countries.

=== Turboprops/turboshafts ===
Most Turbomeca engines bear the names of Pyrenean mountains.

Safran offers several main engine families: Arrius and Arriel (up to 1,000 shaft horsepower), for light and medium helicopters; TM333, Arrano and Ardiden (rated at 1,000 to 2,000 SHP), for civil and military machines in the 5 to 8 ton class; Makila and RTM322 (over 2,000 SHP), for heavy rotorcraft.

Model	Intro.	Until	Min hp	Max hp	Applications
Artouste	1956	1975	400	550	Alouette II, Alouette III
Astazou	1957	?	523	644	Alouette II, Alouette III, Gazelle, Jetstream
Bastan	1960	1976	650	1,048	Nord 260, N 262
Turmo	1962	1987	1,200	1,800	Puma, Super Frelon
Arriel	1974	current	590	1,000	A109, BK 117, EC145, Dauphin and Ecureuil, S-76, Harbin Z-9/Z-19
Makila	1978	current	1,800	2,100	Super Puma, AS532, EC725, Rooivalk
Arrius	1981	current	450	750	AS355, AS555, EC135, EC635, EC120B, A109, Ka-226T, Bell 505
TM 333	1981	?	750	1,100	HAL Dhruv, Cheetah, Chetak
RTM322 (Note: joint project with Rolls-Royce)	1987	current	2,100	2,600	Apache, AW101 NH90
MTR390 (Note: joint project with MTU and Rolls-Royce)	1991	current	1,250	1,450	Tiger
Ardiden	2007	current	1,400	2,000	AC352, HAL Dhruv/HAL Prachand, HAL LUH, Ka-62
Aneto	2018	current	2,500	3,000	AW189K, AW149
Arrano	2019	current	1,100	1,300	H160

=== Turbojets ===
- Turbomeca Marboré
- Turbomeca Palas
- Turbomeca Palouste
- Turbomeca Gabizo

=== Turbofans ===
- Turbomeca Astafan
- Turbomeca Aubisque
- Rolls-Royce Turbomeca Adour - joint project with Rolls-Royce

=== Engines of Microturbo subsidiary ===
- Microturbo SG 18
- Microturbo TRS 18
- Microturbo TRI-40
- Microturbo TRI 60
- Microturbo TRI 80
- Microturbo Cougar
- Microturbo Eclair
- Microturbo Lynx
