= Global Combat Air Programme =

Italy/Japan/UK aircraft development and acquisition programme

Global Combat Air Programme Programma Aereo da Combattimento Globale グローバル戦闘航空プログラム
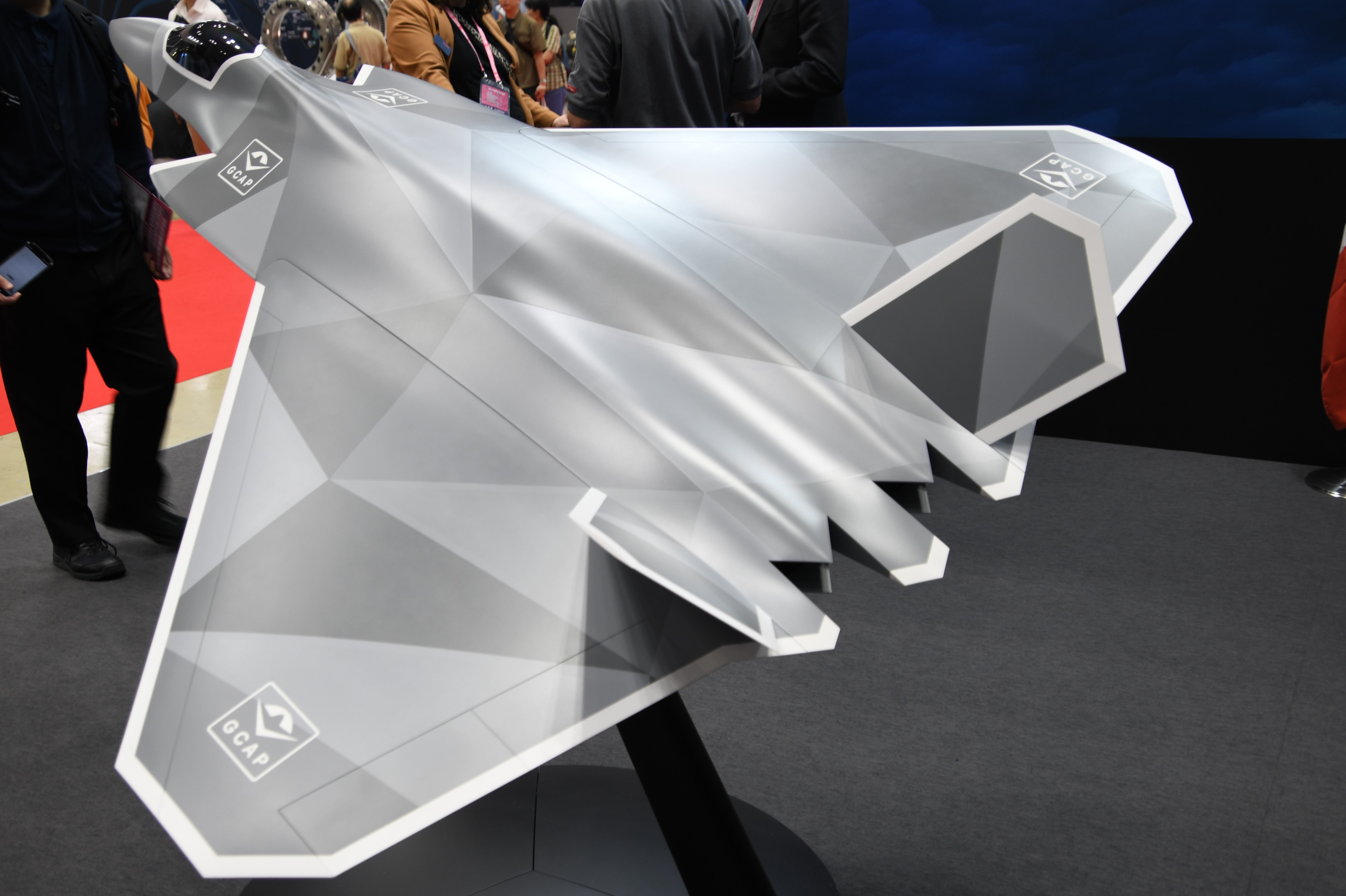
- GCAP concept model (delta wing type) left rear top view in GCAP booth of JA2024 at Tokyo Big Site 2024

General information
- Other names: Italian: Programma Aereo da Combattimento Globale; Japanese: グローバル戦闘航空プログラム, romanized: Gurōbaru Sentō Kōkū Puroguramu
- Project for: Multirole fighter
- National origin: United Kingdom; Japan; Italy
- Manufacturer: BAE Systems Military Air & Information; Leonardo S.p.A. Mitsubishi Heavy Industries
- Designer: GCAP International Government Organisation (GIGO); Edgewing
- Issued by: Royal Air Force; Italian Air Force; Japan Air Self-Defense Force
- Prototypes: Mitsubishi X-2 flown April 2016 - March 2018 'Excalibur' Flight-test aircraft expected in 2026; BAE Systems Combat Air Flying Demonstrator (CAFD) expected in 2027

History
- Initiated: December 2022
- Expected: 2035
- Developed from: BAE Systems Tempest, Mitsubishi F-X
- Predecessors: Eurofighter Typhoon, Mitsubishi F-2

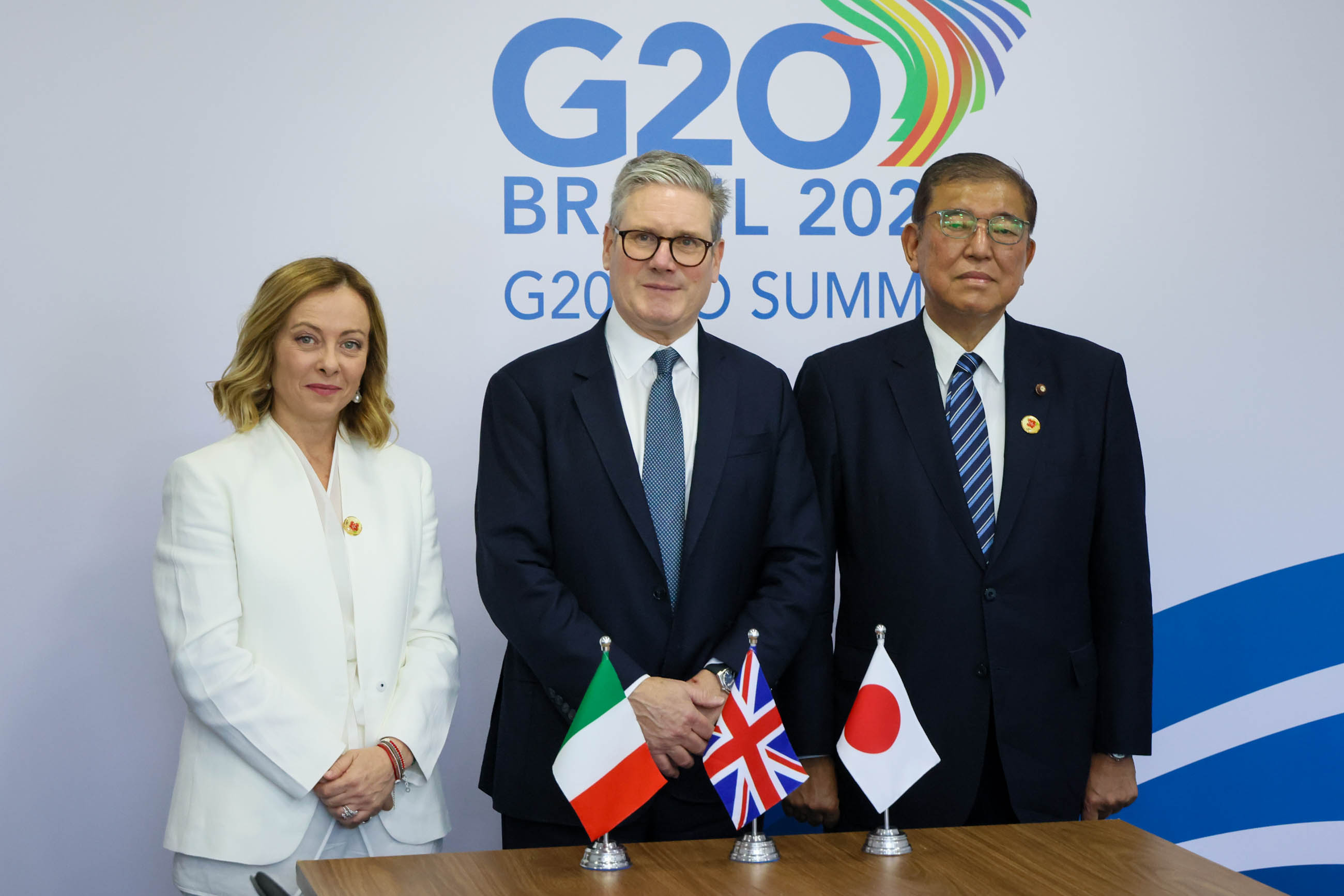
Italian Prime Minister Giorgia Meloni, British Prime Minister Keir Starmer, and Japanese Prime Minister Shigeru Ishiba during the GCAP Leader's meeting at a G20 summit in Rio de Janeiro, November 2024.

The Global Combat Air Programme (GCAP); (Note: Italian: Programma Aereo da Combattimento Globale; PACG; Japanese: グローバル戦闘航空プログラム, romanized: Gurōbaru Sentō Kōkū Puroguramu) is a multinational initiative led by Italy, Japan, and the United Kingdom to jointly develop a sixth-generation, multi-role, stealth fighter, informally referred to as Tempest. Administered through the GCAP International Government Organisation (GIGO) and designed and manufactured by Edgewing, a joint venture formed by Leonardo, BAE Systems and JAIEC (a consortium led by Mitsubishi Heavy Industries), the programme aims to replace the Eurofighter Typhoon in service with the Royal Air Force (RAF) and Italian Air Force, and the Mitsubishi F-2 in service with the Japan Air Self-Defense Force. On 21 July 2026, Canada joined as an observer to the programme.

9 December 2022, the governments of Italy, Japan, and the United Kingdom, jointly announced that they would develop and deploy a common fighter jet, merging their previously separate sixth-generation projects: the United Kingdom-led BAE Systems Tempest developed with Italy, and the Japanese Mitsubishi F-X. This was formalised with a treaty signed in December 2023 in Japan which established the GIGO. The Joint venture Edgewing would officially launch in June 2025. Edgewing received its first internation £686 million contract in April 2026, followed by a larger £4.6 billion contract in July marking the transition from national contracts by each partner, to a fully-fledged international programme.

The aircraft was originally expected to enter service in 2035. Leonardo has estimated that as many as 350 aircraft could be ordered between the three nations. In July 2026, Leonardo CEO Lorenzo Mariani told reports that the aircraft could enter service two years ahead of its 2035 target date.

== Background ==
=== Japan (F-X) ===
Japan, an island nation, has a disproportionately vast air defence identification zone given the size of its land territory, and it was expected that the country would have to protect it with a smaller fleet of fighters compared to those of its growing neighbours with much larger populations. To address this issue, the Ministry of Defence decided in 2010 that Japan's next-generation fighter had to be highly information-based, intelligent, and capable of instantaneous response (i^{3} fighter). At the time, the fighter fleet of the Japan Air Self-Defence Force mainly consisted of the Mitsubishi F-15J and the Mitsubishi F-2. The former is a variant of the F-15, manufactured by Mitsubishi Heavy Industries (hereafter referred to as Mitsubishi) under licence, while the latter was developed by Mitsubishi and Lockheed Martin based on the F-16 in the 1990s. While the F-15J was set to be replaced by the F-35, a replacement for the F-2 needed to be found before its planned retirement in the 2030s.

Following the USA's decision not to allow the export of the F-22 Raptor to any other country in 2007, Japan began looking for a domestic solution to field a new fighter aircraft to replace its Mitsubishi F-2 fleet. From the mid-2000s Japan began funding various research programmes involved in fighter design culminating in the Mitsubishi X-2 Shinshin experimental aircraft which took flight on 22 April 2016. This research and the data collected from the X-2 programme would feed the development of Japan's main fighter effort, the Mitsubishi F-X programme. The IHI Corporation completed a prototype for the XF9 engine in 2018. In 2018, after more than a decade since America's refusal to export the F-22, Lockheed Martin proposed a potential Japan-America collaboration project to develop the F-2 successor based on the F-22 and F-35, but this was rejected by Japan.

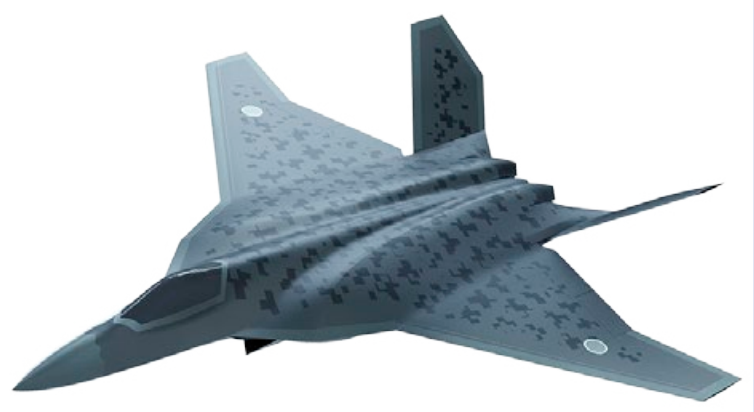
Artist impression of the Mitsubishi F-X

=== United Kingdom & Italy (Tempest) ===
The 2010 Strategic Defence and Security Review (SDSR) committed the United Kingdom to operating a Royal Air Force fast-jet fleet comprising Eurofighter Typhoons, F-35s, and uncrewed combat and reconnaissance aircraft by the 2020s. In preparation for the 2015 SDSR, the UK launched a two-year Future Combat Air System (FCAS) programme to assess options for the post-2030 fleet, including new Uncrewed Combat Air Vehicles (UCAVs), additional F-35 orders, life extension of Typhoon, or a new crewed fighter design.

Following the 2010 Lancaster House Treaties, the UK and France agreed to collaborate on future combat air technologies, including UCAVs intended to replace Typhoon and Rafale aircraft in the 2030s. In 2012, both governments and industry partners (BAE Systems and Dassault Aviation) funded joint studies, leading to a £120 million FCAS Feasibility Phase contract in 2014. Drawing on the Dassault nEUROn and BAE Systems Taranis demonstrators, the study aimed to support a joint UCAV procurement in the 2030s and possible integration into future crewed platforms.

The 2015 SDSR introduced the Future Combat Air System Technology Initiative (FCAS TI) which had three core strands for the development of combat air technologies: international projects (including the joint work with France); national projects; and an open mission system architecture project. In 2016, the feasibility study led to a £1.54 billion prototype UCAV project.

In 2017, France and Germany announced plans to develop a joint fighter to replace the Rafale and Typhoon, forming the European FCAS programme. This initially raised uncertainty over the UK–France UCAV effort, though in early 2018 both governments confirmed its continuation; France intended to pursue a crewed platform with Germany and an uncrewed demonstrator with the UK.

At the 2018 Farnborough Airshow, a mock-up of 'Tempest' was revealed, a BAE Systems led sixth-generation fighter programme that would be developed to replace the RAF's Typhoons in the mid-to-late 2030s. Developed by “Team Tempest” (BAE Systems, Rolls-Royce, Leonardo UK, MBDA UK, and the Ministry of Defence), the programme was accompanied by a new Combat Air Strategy highlighting technological competitiveness and industrial sovereignty. In 2016, the UK combat air sector generated £6.5 billion annually and supported 46,000 jobs.

In February 2019, the FCAS UCAV demonstration programme between the UK and France had seemingly been downgraded to a technology demonstration and study effort, as France deepened its collaboration with Germany.

On 19 July 2019, Sweden signed a Memorandum of understanding (MoU) with the UK to work together to develop concepts and understanding for both nations' FCAS for the future of air combat platforms, and Italy joined the Tempest programme in September 2019. In 2020, Sweden and the UK expanded their partnership through SAAB's £50 million investment in a UK centre of excellence, though Sweden did not formally join the Tempest project. The UK, Italy, and Sweden signed a trilateral FCAS MoU in December 2021.

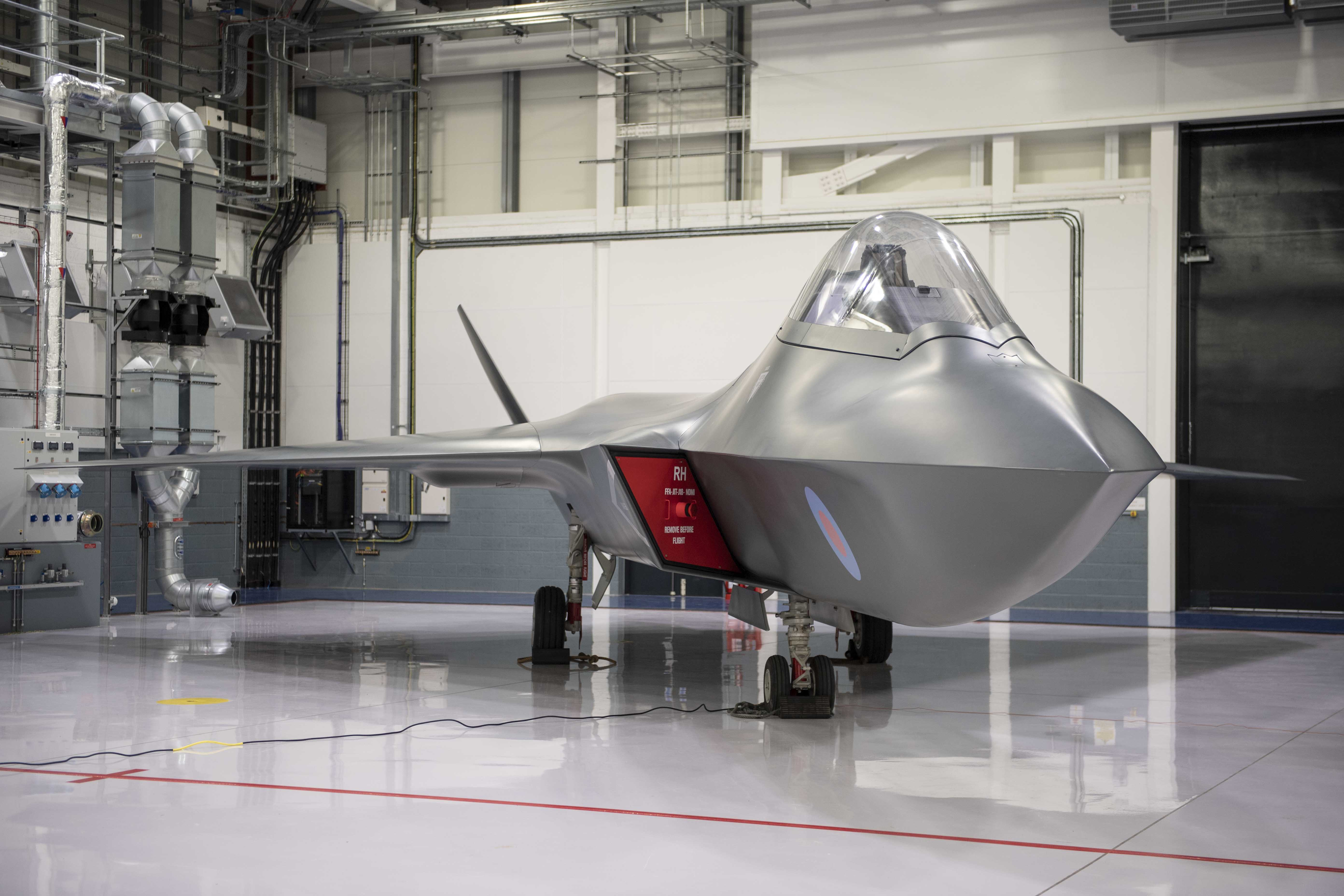
Mock-up of Tempest

A number of new technologies were being explored for Tempest, including:

- Directed-energy weapons
- Augmented reality cockpit - control scheme featuring little-to-no physical controls, instead displaying features virtually on the heads up display via the pilot's helmet. This would reduce aircraft weight, improve upgradability through a software-based approach, and provide additional display space for information outside of the typical flat-screen arrangement. This also includes examinations into interactivity such as motion-control and eye-tracking.
- Biometric and psycho-analytical monitoring - exploring pilot health monitoring during combat and training to identify issues such as stress, confusion, cognitive load, as well as hypoxia or G-LOC.
- Manned-unmanned teaming - crewed aircraft like Tempest working cooperatively with uncrewed aerial vehicles (UAVs) known as 'Adjuncts' (also known as Loyal Wingmen or Remote Weapon Carriers in other aircraft programs)
- Artificial intelligence (AI) - known as the Intelligent Virtual Assistant (IVA) that could assist with aircraft operations or data processing in certain operations or situations.

Much of the technology envisioned for use on Tempest would initially be fielded on two distinct testbed platforms. The first 'Excalibur', a Boeing 757-200 serving as a flight test aircraft would derisk and validate technologies for use on the fighter including the aerodynamics of the fighter's nose section and testing the aircraft's sensor suite. The second would be the Combat Air Flying Demonstrator (CAFD), a crewed supersonic demonstrator aircraft announced in 2022 and expected to take flight around 2027, which would test, among other technologies, the integration of stealth compatible features.

It was envisaged that the programme would agree to funding and manufacturing arrangements by 2025 with an expected in-service date for the aircraft in 2035.

== Development ==
=== Programme Initialisation ===
Discussions for both parties combining their respective fighter development efforts as a means of reducing their overall development costs began as early as 2017. In December 2021, the first results of this endeavour appeared when the UK and Japan announced they would jointly cooperate to produce a demonstrator for a new fighter engine as well as the signing of a memorandum of cooperation to explore future air combat technologies together. On 15 February 2022, a further agreement was reached between both nations to jointly develop sensor capabilities for their respective fighters known as the 'Japan and Great Britain Universal Advanced RF (radio-frequency) system' or 'JAGUAR'.

In July 2022, Reuters reported from anonymous sources within both programmes that both parties were close to a deal that would combine both Tempest and F-X into a single joint programme. On 9 December 2022, this was proven correct when it was officially announced by British Prime Minister Rishi Sunak that the Tempest and F-X programmes would merge into a single endeavour to procure a common multi-role fighter now called the "Global Combat Air Programme" (GCAP). The resulting aircraft would also be expected to be available for export to further reduce the per-unit costs.

The programme is envisaged as an equal partnership between the member nations. In the UK, BAE Systems will act as prime contractor and handle the airframe, Rolls-Royce the engines, Leonardo's UK division the electronics, and MBDA UK the weapons. In Japan, Mitsubishi Heavy Industries will act as prime contractor, with IHI Corporation handling the engines, and Mitsubishi Electric handling the electronics. In Italy, Leonardo S.p.A. will be prime contractor, with Avio Aero working on the engines, and MBDA Italy will also work on missile development. By around 2024, detailed development and cost sharing for each company would be clarified, production to begin around 2030, and the first aircraft to be deployed in 2035.

=== Joint Venture and Corporate Structure ===
==== GCAP International Government Organisation (GIGO) ====
In September 2023, the UK, Italy, and Japan signed a trilateral collaboration agreement to outline long-term working arrangements and capability requirements for GCAP. In December 2023, an international treaty was signed in Tokyo, formally launching the joint development of the future fighter aircraft. The treaty confirmed that both the programme's governmental headquarters and industrial hub would be based in the UK, with Japan providing the first CEO and Italy the first business leader. It also established the GCAP International Government Organisation (GIGO), which would oversee the aircraft's development once ratified by each country's political bodies. The Japanese Ministry of Defence stated that technical officials would be dispatched to support GIGO, and that secure facilities and daily coordination between governments and industries would underpin the development process.

In June 2024, Japan's National Diet ratified the GCAP convention followed by the UK in October 2024 and Italy in November 2024, formally establishing GIGO.

On 15 January 2025, the UK Ministry of Defence (MoD) announced that the GIGO would be headquartered in Reading and led by its first Chief Executive, Oka Masami.

The GIGO is formed of two components: the GCAP Agency which oversees the delivery of the programme and the Steering Committee which directs them on behalf of the three governments.

==== Edgewing (Joint Venture) ====
On 13 December 2024, the three national industrial partners for the GCAP announced the formation of a business joint venture that will be accountable for the design, development, and delivery of the aircraft by the mid-2030s and throughout its expected service life beyond 2070. BAE Systems, Japan Aircraft Industrial Enhancement Co Ltd (JAIEC), and Leonardo will each hold a 33.3% stake in the venture. The agreement will now go for approval to the national regulatory authorities before it is formally established in mid-2025; the company will be headquartered in the UK alongside the GIGO.

In December 2024, Leonardo stated that it had already signed GCAP-related R&D contracts worth €100 million with subcontractors in Italy, whilst the Italian MoD had earmarked €8.8 billion to the programme. Leonardo outlined that it would be the leader in four domains for the aircraft's development: flight system integration, weapons integration, training integration, and two activities under the domain of mission system: the weapons effect management system and the flight control system. Leonardo emphasised a new way of collaborating on the development of all key activities linked to sixth-generation aspects, using an innovative model that will see all three national entities working together but with the leading nation in that domain coordinating the different areas, with clusters of engineers from all three nations working together across different sites. Meanwhile, more conventional elements of the aircraft will be assigned to single nations for development.

The Joint Venture will have four main sites one in each nation, including the headquarters in the United Kingdom. The main Italian site will be Torino Caselle, the home of the Italian Eurofighter assembly line, but work will be spread across Leonardo sites in Rome, Pomezia, Florence and Nerviano for electronics and avionics. Of the 9,000 people working on GCAP at the current stage, 3,000 are Italian. Leonardo highlighted the importance of cyber-security and cyber-engineers to the programme, both for aircraft itself, but also for the facilities developing the aircraft.

On 20 June 2025, the Joint Venture was officially named Edgewing.

=== Japan's defence export reforms ===
Japan's policy on defence exports has been one of heavy restriction since the introduction of the Three Principles of Arms Exports in 1967, followed by a near-total ban on defence exports enacted in 1976. This policy was essentially maintained until 2014 with the introduction of the Three Principles on Transfer of Defense Equipment and Technology which framed defence exports as a means of promoting peace and international cooperation and allowed for the export of products manufactured under license in Japan to be exported to original licensor, with further reforms enacted in December 2023.

In March 2024, Prime Minister Fumio Kishida said that further defence export reforms were necessary to support GCAP and allow the export of the future fighter to international customers which would reduce production costs, strengthen Japan's security posture, and ensure that Japan is recognised as a reliable partner in international defence joint development programmes. Later that month, the Japanese cabinet approved revisions to its strict export rules, permitting the transfer of defence equipment, including the jointly developed fighter, to partner nations that have signed defence cooperation agreements and are not involved in active conflicts. Japan's 2024 Defence White Paper published in September explained that these reforms were necessary to align with the UK and Italy, both of which viewed exports of the finished aircraft as essential for cost reduction and international influence. To support this, Japan revised its Three Principles on Transfer of Defence Equipment and Technology and their Implementation Guidelines, introducing three specific restrictions governing GCAP exports:

1. At present, direct transfers of GCAP material from Japan are restricted to finished products only.
2. Transfers are restricted to nations who have signed international agreements obligating the use of Japanese defence equipment transferred in a manner consistent with the purposes and principles of the Charter of the United Nations.
3. Transfers can not be made to a country where combat is currently deemed to be taking place as part of an armed conflict.

=== Funding ===
In August 2025, as part of Japan's Military ¥8.8 trillion ($60.1 billion) budget request for fiscal year 2026, ¥206.6 billion ($1.27 billion) was allocated to GCAP.

In February 2026, the Italian Parliament's defence committee approved a government request for €8.8 billion in further funding for GCAP to dispensed annually out to 2037. The approval process for the new funding also revealed that Italian estimates for the early development of the fighter programme had tripled over the last five years from €6 billion to €18.6 billion. The €8.8 billion came on top of €2 billion having already been committed in previous years. The remaining €7.8 billion required would be arranged at a later date

The UK had intended to publish its 10-year Defence Investment Plan (DIP) in Autumn 2025 in which would include billions of pounds in funding for GCAP to cement an international contract for the development of the aircraft in September 2025. However, publication had repeatedly been delayed over funding disagreements during negotiations between the MoD and the Treasury. Lack of British funding became a source of frustration for both Italy and particularly Japan who were concerned that a delay in funding the programme could affect the 2035 delivery timeline for the new fighter. On 2 April 2026, the GCAP Agency signed a £686 million stopgap contract with Edgewing. This funding would allow development work to continue until the end of June when the DIP was hoped to be published and a larger contract could be signed. Disputes regarding financing the DIP would eventually culminate in the resignation of defence secretary John Healey and Armed Forces Minister Al Carns in June. The DIP would eventually be published on 30 June outlining £8.6 billion in funding for GCAP over the next four years.

On 3 July 2026, Edgewing received a further £4.6 billion 18-month contract from the GCAP Agency to complete the advanced concept and assessment phase as well as further joint detailed design and development work.

On 22 July 2026, the UK awarded a £708 million contract extension to BAE Systems to continue work alongside the Team Tempest consortium on the development of domestic specific technologies for GCAP and wider UK Future Combat Air systems.

=== Demonstration programmes ===
==== Excalibur Flight Test Aircraft ====
Excalibur is the first of two UK demonstrator aircraft established under the original Tempest programme. Commissioned in 2018 and developed by Leonardo UK and 2Excel, Excalibur is a modified Boeing 757 designed to serve as a Flight Test Aircraft (FTA) supporting the development of GCAP's Integrated Sensing and Non-Kinetic Effects (ISKANE) including electronic warfare systems and radar, electro-optical, and infrared sensors, as well as the Integrated Communication System (ICS).

On July 14, 2023, the RAF awarded Leonardo UK and 2Excel a £115 million contract to transition into second phase development. This would see the purchase of a second Boeing 757 that would be modified into Excalibur, building upon the analysis conducted from the deconstruction of the first 757 airframe between 2021 and 2022.

On 9 December 2024, Excalibur had successfully completed its first phase of modification and flight testing from MOD Boscombe Down with the aircraft having been fitted with side and belly pods for hosting systems such as the Integrated Sensors, Non-Kinetic Effects (ISANKE) and Integrated Communications Systems (ICS), developed by Leonardo UK and its international partners. Excalibur continued test flights with additional fairing and apertures added in early 2026.

On 22 July 2026, Excalibur completed its second stage of airframe modifications and was now awaiting airframe certification before shifting to onboard systems tests over the next three years. In the early 2030s the aircraft's purpose will move to hosting of GCAP's operational systems for testing; and later test support for in-service development of the fighter.

==== BAE Systems Combat Air Flying Demonstrator (CAFD) ====
The Combat Air Flying Demonstrator (CAFD) is the second UK demonstrator programme commissioned under the original Tempest programme. Commissioned in July 2022 with its first flight scheduled for 2027, CAFD is a crewed, supersonic, low-observable demonstrator aircraft developed by BAE Systems to de-risk the delivery of future fighter by rehearsing the application of new design and manufacturing technologies as well as aircraft certification and testing processes, capabilities UK has not fully utilised in decades. The lessons learned from CAFD will feed into the UK's industrial contribution to GCAP much like Japan's earlier Mitsubishi X-2 demonstrator, with the efforts of the CAFD programme having already been said to have saved years of development risk.

As of June 2026, CAFD is expected to be ready for flight by the end of 2027 with 75% of the demonstrator by volume having been manufactured. In July, BAE Systems further announced that the final assembly of around half of the aircraft's main structure has commenced while the design of 11,500 parts of the aircraft, accounting of over 90% of the aircraft's weight, has been completed.

==== Japan and Italy ====
In September 2025, it was announced that both Italy and Japan will also produce their own domestic flight test aircraft. Italy will modify a Gulfstream business jet without a fly-by-wire system to avoid interference with the prototype electronics. Mitsubishi may convert a larger transport aircraft such as the Kawasaki C-2 as a flying testbed.

== Design ==
=== Aircraft design concepts ===
The initial concept art for the aircraft shown following GCAP's announcement in 2022 was of a large, twin-engine, low-observable aircraft with a unique modified cranked delta-wing configuration. However, on 22 July 2024, at the Farnborough Airshow, an updated airframe concept design was unveiled alongside the aircraft's first 1:1 scale model. The new model showed a redesigned wing shape to that of a true delta and increase in wing size indicative of an emphasis on increased fuel capacity (range), weapon capacity, and speed. Whilst there has yet to be official dimensional characteristics released for the fighter, Janes' Gareth Jennings in attendance of the unveiling talking of the scale model drew comparison to the 19 metre wingspan of the F-111 Aardvark. GCAP officials stressed that this was still a concept model and therefore not representative of the finished design. Officials also highlighted that tens of thousands of people could be involved with GCAP over the programme's decades-long life and shared their belief that full-rate production for the aircraft would stretch beyond 2060. Herman Claesen of BAE Systems indicated that the current design philosophy for the aircraft is that it is not intended to have any designated full-operational capability (FOC) dates. Claesen explained that aircraft's open-architecture design simplifies upgrades throughout the aircraft's service life compared to legacy air systems.

On 5 February 2025, the UK revealed the Tornado 2 Tempest project (T2T), which saw components from the RAF's since retired Tornado aircraft fleet recycled into new complex components which could be used for the future fighter. The initiative was formed to examine whether strategic materials still present in surplus MoD assets such as high quality steel, aluminium and titanium could be atomised into powders, known as “feedstock”, for additive manufacturing to make new parts. The potential benefit being to increase the accessibility of critical and high-value metals by reusing what is already present in existing stockpiles that could now be remade in lighter, stronger, and long lasting forms than what could be previously possible with traditional forging methods. T2T demonstrated the cleaning and atomising of titanium from a Tornado's jet engine compressor blades from a low-pressure air compressor which was then used to 3D print new compressor blades and nose cone which Roll-Royce installed into an Orpheus test engine which then successfully ran at test-conditions (Orpheus being a Roll-Royce programme exploring new design, development, and manufacturing concepts for defence-related propulsion systems). T2T also demonstrated a Digital Product Passport system, capturing and recording material provenance and lifecycle data which potentially enables more informed decisions around material allocation and protect against the use of counterfeit materials.

On 12 March 2025, It was reported that Leonardo expects that 350 aircraft will be ordered by 2035. For comparison, combining the Typhoon and F-2 fleets of Italy, the UK, and Japan yields a minimum requirement for 290 airframes from the three core partner nations.

On 1 April 2025, during an interview an MoD representative detailed some expected capabilities of the aircraft including carrying "roughly double an F-35A's [weapon] payload", carrying sufficient sensor capability to independently form a kill-chain, and carrying the necessary computing power for controlling the system of systems (i.e. low-cost drones) whilst deep inside hostile territory where connections to traditional support assets like the E-7 Wedgetail may be restricted, all whilst remaining survivable. In regards to the aircraft's range, it may be able to cross the Atlantic on internal fuel unlike the Typhoon which requires refuelling three or four times.

In July 2026, it was announced that the fighter will be fitted with a Universal Aerial Refuelling Receptacle Slipway Installation (UARRSI) to allow the aircraft to be refuelled by Boom-equipped tankers.

On 31 July 2026, Leonardo's chief executive reported that there was ministerial pressure to accelerate the delivery of GCAP's fighter product ahead of original 2035 timeline by a couple of years. This idea was described as feasible by "probably modulating the requirements that this initial version would fulfil."

=== System of systems ===
As of 2024, GCAP is solely focused on the development of a sixth generation fighter aircraft, with the partner nations not having publicly stated their intention to cooperate on wider air combat developments under the system of systems approach taken by similar programmes like the European FCAS. As such, the development of wider assets, namely uncrewed systems has so far been a sovereign effort for each nation (e.g. UK's LANCA programme).

In mid-March 2024, during a press briefing, Leonardo's CEO Roberto Cingolani criticised the UK for lack of transparency regarding the details for the procurement of the wider System of systems for GCAP that the crewed fighter component would contribute to and that there was still uncertainty regarding the manufacturing and development responsibilities of the various partner companies.

In July 2024, during the Farnborough Airshow, Airbus had reportedly suggested that its Wingman Unmanned Adjunct (WUA) could be developed for GCAP with help from the programme's industrial partners. Airbus also stressed that this would not conflict with its existing efforts as a lead industrial partner for FCAS as the WUA is an entirely separate and self-funded effort.

=== Engine development ===
During Farnborough Airshow 2024, Rolls-Royce stated that it was progressing with the full-scale ground-based engine demonstrator for the fighter. Developed in concert with Italy's Avio Aero and Japan's IHI Corporation, the demonstrator is designed to initially test technologies developed by the three companies for compatibility, as well as common design tools, design processes, and audit processes for the production engine. In the future, the demonstrator is expected to serve as a test-bed for upgrades to the production-model power and propulsion system of the fighter.

On 9 September 2025, Rolls-Royce, Avio Aero, and IHI signed an evolved collaboration agreement allowing them to engage directly with Edgewing, cementing them as the international consortium for developing the power and propulsion system of the fighter. The associated press release also detailed the successful test of a new engine combustor design.

=== Sensor and communication development ===
On 9 September 2025, Japan's Mitsubishi Electric, Italy's ELT Group as well as Leonardo and Leonardo UK, formed the GCAP Electronics Evolution (G2E) consortium in preparation for a contract award by Edgewing to deliver the advanced sensing and communication system known as Integrated Sensing and Non-Kinetic Effects & Integrated Communications Systems (ISANKE & ICS), as well as its associated Through-Life Support Service (TLSS). G2E will be based in Reading, UK close to the GIGO. It is believed that the UK and Japanese firms will lead with radar development, Italy with Infrared Search and Track systems, and Japan on satellite communications.

== Operators ==
=== Future operators ===
Italy

- Italian Air Force

Japan

- Japan Air Self-Defense Force

United Kingdom

- Royal Air Force

=== Potential operators ===
- Australia – in December 2024, it was reported that the United Kingdom was approaching Australia for involvement in the programme. On 27 March 2025, it was confirmed that an informational briefing from the GCAP consortium to officials of the Royal Australian Air Force (RAAF) occurred during the Avalon Australian International Airshow. However, Air Vice-Marshal Nicholas Hogan, head of air force capability for the RAAF said that whilst GCAP was exciting, there were still too many unknowns at this stage to present options to the Government regarding the aircraft.
- Canada - In December 2025, Politico reported that Canada's outgoing High Commissioner to London indicated that Canada was examining GCAP as a possible follow-on to its F-35A procurement. By March 2026, anonymous officials revealed that Canada was poised to join GCAP as an observer, with the three core partner nations planning to formally announce Canada's participation at a defence minister's meeting in Britain as early as July. On 14 July 2026, Politico reported that Canada had reached a deal to join the program as an observer, with a formal announcement to be made the following week. The following week on 21 July 2026, Canada's observer nation status was officially announced by UK Defence Secretary Wes Streeting.
- Germany – In November 2023, The Times reported that Germany was considering abandoning the €100 billion FCAS programme with France and Spain in favour of joining GCAP, amid ongoing disputes over intellectual property, industrial participation, and broader defence tensions, including Germany's F-35A procurement. Some analysts suggested this may have been a negotiating tactic to gain concessions from France and Spain, while others questioned whether Germany could secure an equivalent role within GCAP. In September 2025, Politico reported that Dassault's push for an 80% workshare on the Next Generation Weapon System reignited tensions in Berlin, which had previously agreed to an equal split with France and Spain. These disagreements prompted Germany to explore alternatives, including replacing France with Sweden or the UK, or pursuing the programme with Spain alone, though continuing with France remained the preferred option if workshare issues could be resolved. On 8 October 2026, British Prime Minister Andy Burnham stated the UK was open to Germany joining the programme following early exploratory discussions.
- India - On 18 March 2026, the Indian Ministry of Defence informed the Parliamentary Standing Committee on Defence that the Indian Air Force seeks to join one of the European 6th Generation Fighter Consortium, with the GCAP and FCAS being listed as the two programs. But in August 2026, India announced that they are joining the Future Combat Air System.
- Poland - in March 2026 Deputy Minister of State Assets Konrad Gołota said when asked about joining GCAP: “there is understanding for our proposal and a willingness to continue discussions” and said he had been in contact with the three partner countries.
- Portugal – in July 2025, Portugal's Minister of National Defence said that the country would look to join either GCAP or FCAS as an observer under wider modernisation plans for the Portuguese Air Force.
- Saudi Arabia – In August 2023, the Financial Times reported that Saudi Arabia was seeking to join GCAP. While the UK and Italy were open to the idea, Japan opposed it, citing concerns over export policy, programme timelines, technology security, and Saudi Arabia's limited technical contribution. At the February 2024 World Defence Show, Saudi officials reiterated their interest, emphasising that participation would depend on meaningful local industrial involvement, in line with national goals to reinvest 50% of defence spending domestically by 2030. During the 2024 G20 Summit, Italy, the UK and Japan discussed potential Saudi participation, focusing on cost-sharing and technology transfer. Italian officials later indicated that Saudi Arabia was likely to join. In February 2025, Leonardo's co-director general stated that Saudi involvement could be strengthened by building local aerospace capability, including joint work on helicopters or Typhoon jets, and establishing component production to prepare for a future role in GCAP.
- Singapore - In July 2026, it was reported that Singapore was engaged in exploratory discussions regarding involvement in GCAP.
- Sweden – In December 2022, shortly after GCAP was announced, Japan and Sweden signed a defence technology transfer agreement, prompting speculation that Sweden might join the programme to replace its Saab JAS 39 Gripen, given its earlier cooperation with the UK and Italy on FCAS. At the International Fighter Conference in December 2023, Swedish officials stated that a decision on a future fighter would not be made until 2031, following national studies and planning. They also confirmed that Sweden had previously withdrawn from discussions with the UK and Italy, without providing reasons. While future participation in GCAP was not ruled out, delaying a decision risked reducing Sweden's influence over the programme's development.

== Similar programmes ==
- Chengdu J-36 – (China)
- Shenyang J-50 – (China)
- Next Generation Air Dominance (NGAD) - The US Air Force's sixth-generation fighter programme to develop Boeing F-47.
- F/A-XX - The US Navy's sixth-generation fighter programme to develop Boeing F/A-XX.
- Future Combat Air System (FCAS) - Cancelled European (French / German / Spanish) sixth-generation fighter programme.

== See also ==
- Future of the Royal Air Force
