= XF5 =

XF5 may refer to:

== Aviation ==
- Grumman XF5F Skyrocket, experimental twin-engined interceptor
- IHI Corporation XF5. turbofan jet engine
- Northrop F-5 (experimental designation XF5-A), supersonic light fighter
- Vought XF5U "Flying Flapjack", experimental disc-winged fighter

== Other uses ==
- The X Factor (British series 5), British TV series
