= Ishikawajima-Harima F3 =

1981 Japanese jet engine

F3
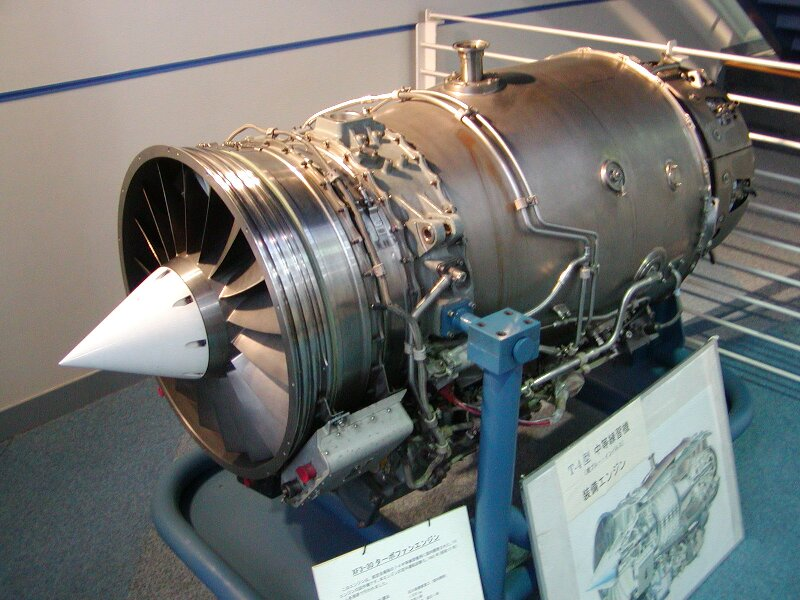
- IHI F3 Turbofan Engine
- Type: Turbofan
- National origin: Japan
- Manufacturer: IHI Corporation
- First run: 1981
- Major applications: Kawasaki T-4
- Number built: ~550

The Ishikawajima-Harima Heavy Industries (IHI) F3 is a low bypass turbofan engine developed in Japan by Ishikawajima-Harima Heavy Industries for the Kawasaki T-4 jet trainer aircraft. The first prototype engine, the XF3, was manufactured in 1981 and first flew in the XT-4 in July 1985. About 550 have been built.

== Design and development ==
Ishikawajima-Harima began developing a small turbofan engine in the late 1970s as a competitor for the new jet trainer aircraft being developed by Kawasaki Heavy Industries. The developmental engine was named the XF3, and it was selected over the SNECMA Turbomeca Larzac in 1982 to power the XT-4 trainer. The early developmental models of the engine produced 2,600 pounds-force (12 kN) of thrust, but later models (including the model selected for the XT-4) produced 3,600 lbf (16 kN) of thrust.

The production engine was designated the F3-30 (alternatively, the F3-IHI-30), and it first flew in the XT-4 aircraft in 1985. Production of the qualified engine also began in 1985.

After the engine and aircraft were in production there were several incidents where one or two of the high pressure turbine blades failed, forcing the aircraft to make emergency landings. An investigation revealed that the turbine section was suffering from a vibration resonance problem, leading to the turbine blade failures. The blades were strengthened and modified to dampen the vibrations. The engine, and the aircraft, returned to service in 1990.

Beginning in 1999, IHI began upgrading the fielded engines with a new high-pressure turbine to increase their service life. This variant of the engine was known as the F3-IHI-30B.

In 2003, IHI began updating the engine with a more advanced FADEC. This updated engine was designated the F3-IHI-30C.

=== XF3-400 ===
Soon after IHI began working on the XF-3, they began developing a more powerful variant of the engine as a technology demonstrator for a theoretical supersonic fighter. This engine was designated the XF3-400. It was designed to be a higher performance, afterburning version of the XF-3, producing around 7,600 lbf (34 kN) of thrust. One distinctive quality of this engine was that it was to have a thrust-to-weight ratio of 7:1, higher than any similarly sized engine.

Work on this engine began in earnest in 1986, and a demonstrator engine was built and tested in 1987. IHI was formally awarded a contract for the engine in 1992, after spending the previous years developing and testing the engine internally.

The primary difference between the XF3-400 and the standard F3-30 is the inclusion of an afterburner. Adding the afterburner is the primary reason why the maximum thrust of the -400 is much higher than the -30. Other changes included compressor and turbine blades that were aerodynamically optimized using 3D computational fluid dynamics techniques, and improved temperature performance in the high-pressure turbine.

A 1998 report revealed that thrust vectoring was also being integrated into the XF3-400.

=== Design ===
The F3 is a two-shaft (or two spool) low-bypass turbofan. It features a two-stage fan (low-pressure compressor) on the low-pressure shaft, followed by a five-stage high-pressure compressor on the high-pressure shaft. The engine uses an annular combustor, which feeds a single-stage high-pressure turbine followed by a single-stage low-pressure turbine. The XF3-400 variant includes an afterburner after the low-pressure turbine, the production F3 does not.

The two-stage fan uses wide chord blades, and both the production F3 and the advanced XF3-400 use the same fan. Unlike the fan, the five-stage compressor differs between the F3 and the XF3-400, with the advanced XF3-400 benefiting from 3D computational fluid dynamics (CFD) improvements.

The high-pressure turbine blades are single-crystal blades, and they are cooled by a thin film of air from inside of the blades. The low-pressure turbine blades, like the high-pressure compressor, were improved between the F3 and the XF3-400 using 3D CFD.

Both the F3 and the XF3-400 use a FADEC for engine control.

== Variants ==
XF3
Early developmental designation of what became the F3-IHI-30. Several different configurations were considered in this phase of the program.
F3-IHI-30
Production variant of the engine. Used by the Kawasaki T-4.
F3-IHI-30B
Production version of the engine with an upgraded high pressure turbine.
F3-IHI-30C
Production version of the engine with an improved FADEC.
IHI-17
XF3-400
Supersonic technology demonstrator variant of the engine. Much higher thrust than the production F3. Includes an afterburner and several aerodynamic upgrades.

== Applications ==
- Kawasaki T-4

== Specifications (F3-IHI-30) ==
Data from

==== General characteristics ====
- Type: twin-spool turbofan
- Length: 79 in (200 cm)
- Diameter: 25 in (63 cm)
- Dry weight: 750 lb (340 kg)

==== Components ====
- Compressor: axial, 2 stage, low pressure compressor, 5 stage high pressure compressor
- Combustors: annular
- Turbine: single stage high pressure turbine, two stage low pressure turbine

==== Performance ====
- Maximum thrust: 3,680 lbf (16.4 kN)
- Overall pressure ratio: 11:1
- Bypass ratio: 0.9:1
- Specific fuel consumption: 0.7 lb/(lbf h)
- Thrust-to-weight ratio: 4.9

== See also ==
Related development

- IHI Corporation XF5
- IHI Corporation F7
- IHI Corporation XF9

Comparable engines

- SNECMA Turbomeca Larzac
- NPO Saturn AL-55

Related lists

- List of aircraft engines
