= Mitsubishi F-X =

Future Sixth-generation air superiority fighter

F-X
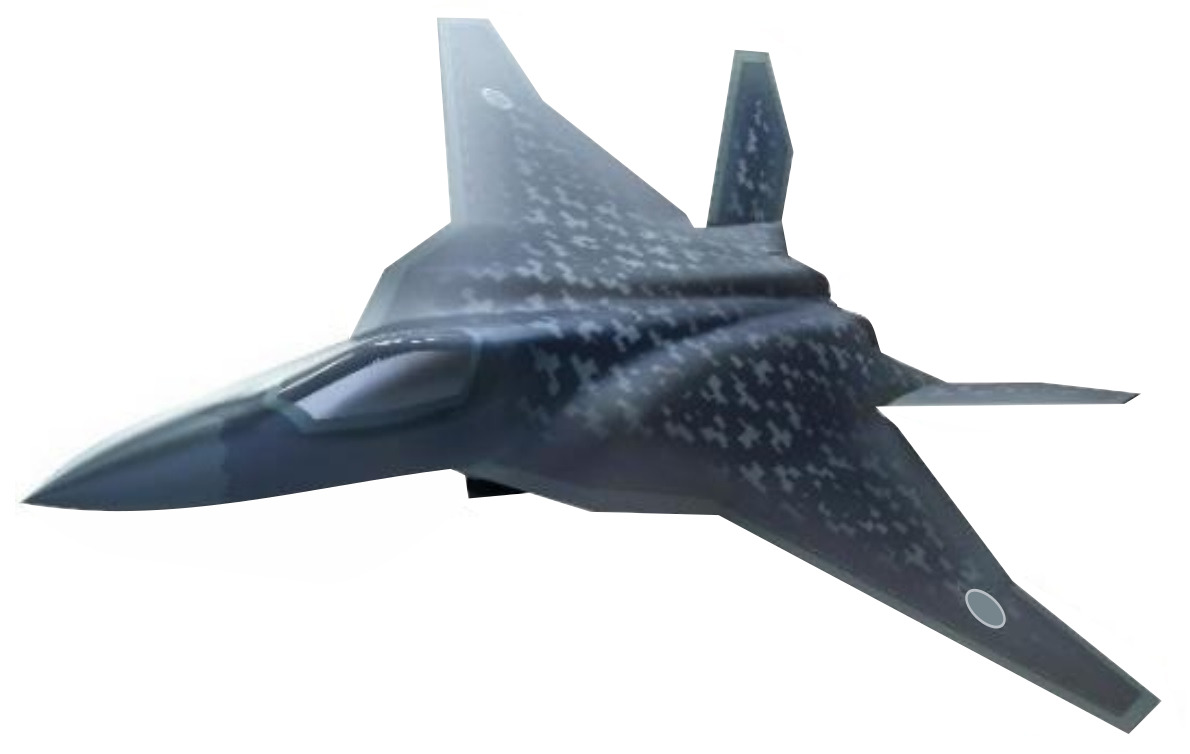
- Concept design of F-X fighter

General information
- Type: Stealth air superiority fighter
- National origin: Japan
- Manufacturer: Mitsubishi Heavy Industries
- Status: Merged into Global Combat Air Programme
- Primary user: Japan Air Self-Defense Force (planned)

History
- Manufactured: 2024 (first prototype production planned) 2031 (full-scale production planned)
- Introduction date: 2035 (planned)
- First flight: 2028 (planned)
- Developed from: i3 fighter Mitsubishi X-2 Shinshin

The Mitsubishi F-X (unofficially called F-3) was a sixth-generation stealth fighter that was in development for the Japan Air Self-Defense Force (JASDF). It was to be Japan's first domestically developed stealth fighter jet and to replace the Mitsubishi F-2 by the mid-2030s. Its development also aimed to bolster the nation's defense industry and potentially enter the international arms market amid Japan's changing defense posture. In October 2020, Mitsubishi Heavy Industries was selected as the lead developer. On 9 December 2022 the governments of Japan, the United Kingdom, and Italy jointly announced that they would develop and deploy a common fighter jet under a project called the Global Combat Air Programme (GCAP), merging development of the latter two nations' BAE Systems Tempest and the F-X.

== Development ==
=== Origins ===
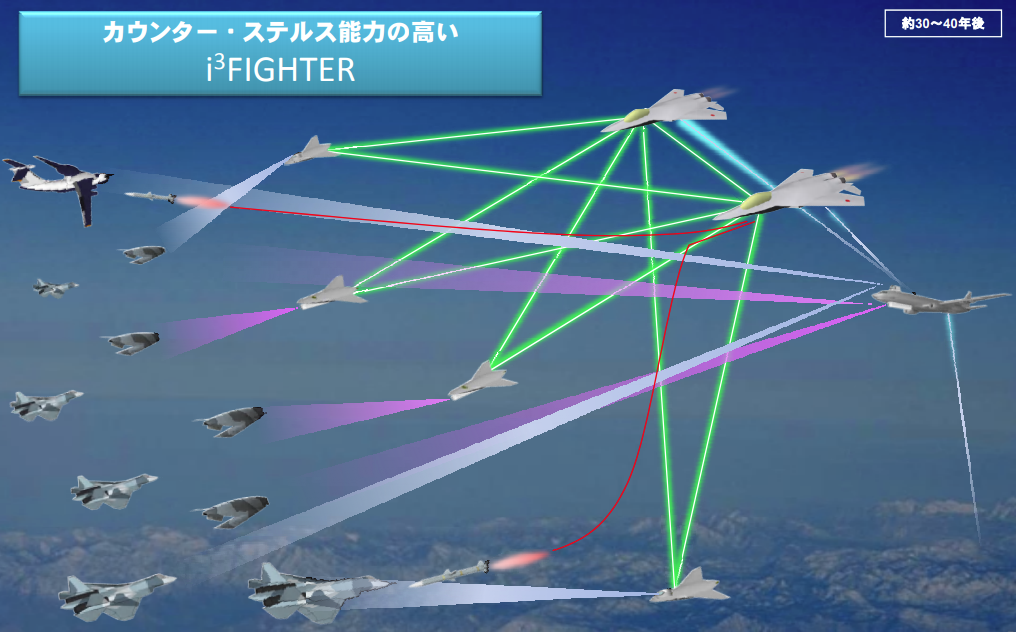
i^{3} FIGHTERs and accompanying UAVs demonstrating Cloud Shooting

The F-X program began when the United States banned exports of the Lockheed Martin F-22 Raptor as part of the 1997 Obey amendment in order to safeguard its technology. With Japan no longer able to purchase the F-22, a domestically developed fighter was chosen instead to replace Japan's aging fleet of fighter jets. Between December 2009 and August 2010, the Ministry of Defense (MoD) conducted a study of developing a future fighter jet to replace the F-2. The research conducted called for a new fighter jet that would be a generation ahead of contemporary fifth-generation fighters. The concept fighter was named the i^{3} Fighter (Informed, Intelligent, Instantaneous). Some technology and capabilities the concept fighter was to possess include advanced radar systems to counter stealth technology of other fighters, receiving targeting information from other platforms (drones, fighters and/or airborne early warning and control aircraft), use of fly-by-optics (much like the Kawasaki P-1) to process information faster, stealth technology, gallium nitride semiconductors to improve radar performance, and a new, more powerful and compact engine.

=== Mitsubishi X-2 demonstrator ===
Much of the development of the F-X program correlated with the development of the Mitsubishi X-2 Shinshin. The development of the X-2 demonstrator allowed Japan to obtain new information and develop new technology related to their next generation fighter jet. The X-2 made its maiden flight on 22 April 2016. The X-2's testing concluded in March 2018.

=== Continued development and procurement strategy ===
==== Aircraft components ====
Concurrent to the X-2's development and testing, Japan conducted a similar program of research focused on the F-X fighter. This research and testing continued while Japan sought international collaborators to join the program.

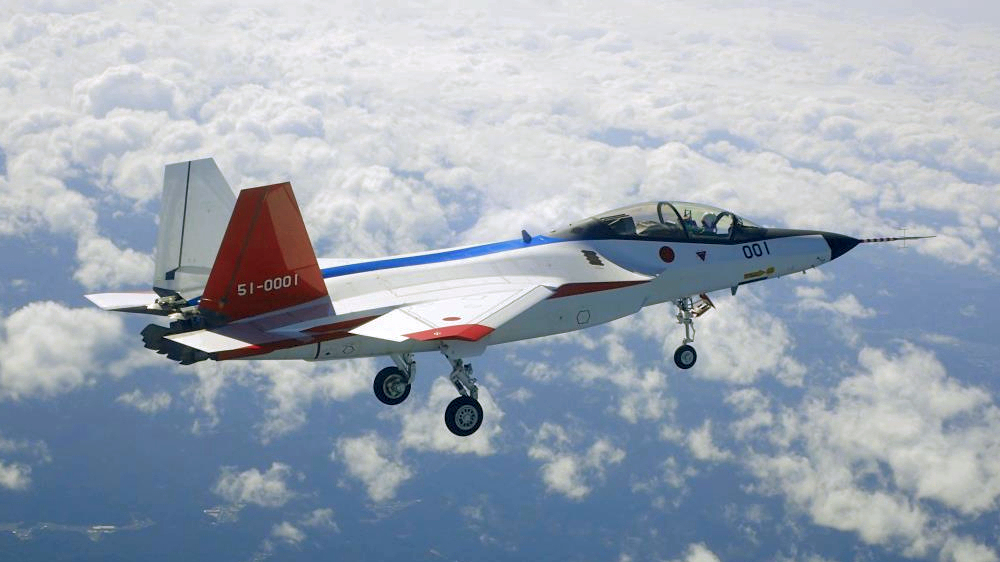
Mitsubishi X-2 Shinshin

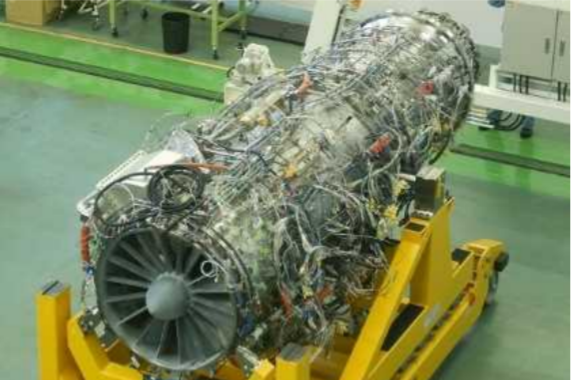
IHI Corporation XF9

List of F-X related evaluations
Evaluation period	Name of evaluation	Development time period	Total cost	Purpose
October 2009	Study on advanced integrated sensor system	Prototype: 2010 - 2014; Testing: 2014 - 2016	¥500 million	Detect stealth aircraft using various sensors working in tandem with each other
October 2009	Research on aerodynamic technology for weapon internalization	Prototype: 2010 - 2013; Testing: 2013 - 2014	¥1.3 billion	Simulate the separation of internal weapons from weapon bays to study aerodynamic phenomenon acting on the mounted object at transonic and supersonic speed
October 2009	Research on main components of next-generation engine	Prototype: 2010 - 2014; Testing: 2014 - 2015	¥100 million	Achieve high thrust-to-weight ratio for next-generation engine by developing high-temperature combustor, high-temperature/high-pressure turbine and light-weight compressor
July 2011 - August 2011	Research on integrated fire control technology for fighters	Prototype: 2012 - 2016; Testing: 2015 - 2017	¥9.1 billion	Develop a Network centered battlespace to enable data sharing and cooperation between stealth aircraft, conventional platforms, and enabling assets like AWACsS
July 2012 - September 2012	Study on engine elements for fighters	Prototype: 2013 - 2017; Testing: 2015 - 2017	¥172 billion	Design high power engine to be slim and possess high thrust
July 2012 - September 2012	Research on weapon release/stealth	Prototype: 2013 - 2017; Testing: 2016 - 2017	¥3.8 billion	Develop internal weapons bay to reduce RCS and drag
July 2012 - September 2012	Research on advanced RF self-defense simulation	Prototype: 2013 - 2016; Testing: 2015 - 2018	¥1.6 billion	Develop electronic warfare equipment to counter aircraft and missiles
July 2013 - August 2013	Study on high power microwave technology	Prototype: 2014 - 2017; Testing: 2016 - 2018	¥1.8 billion	Develop high power microwave technology to neutralize incoming missile
July 2013 - August 2013	Study on high resolution technology of infrared image	Prototype: 2014 - 2017; Testing: 2016 - 2019	¥3.8 billion	Enhance resolution of infrared imaging technology for various platforms, i.e. fighter jets
July 2013 - August 2013	Research on airframe structure weight reduction technology	Prototype: 2014 - 2017; Testing: 2017 - 2018	¥5.7 billion	Utilize high-precision stress analysis technology to reduce weight of future fighter air-frame and analyze strength risk associated with weight reduction
July 2014 - August 2014	Study on technical feasibility of future fighters	Prototype: 2015 - 2017; Testing: 2016 - 2017	¥5.4 billion	Develop virtual vehicle design to determine on whether to develop an F-2 successor
July 2014 - August 2014	Study on engine system for fighter	Prototype: 2015 - 2018; Testing: 2017 - 2019	¥14.2 billion	Develop and trial the XF9 engine
July 2014 - August 2014	Study on electric actuation technology	Prototype: 2015 - 2017; Testing: 2018	¥2.3 billion	Develop electric actuators to replace conventional hydraulic system
July 2014 - August 2014	Study on radome for stealth fighter	Prototype: 2015 - 2019; Testing: 2018 - 2020	¥5.4 billion	Design a radome to protect radar and maximize aerodynamic, stealth and radar performance
July 2014 - August 2014	Study on future HMD system	Prototype: 2015 - 2018; Testing: 2018 - 2019	¥3.5 billion	Develop future HMD system with wide field of vision and binocular, multi-color display
July 2015 - August 2015	Study on thrust deflection nozzle	Prototype: 2016 - 2019; Testing: 2017 - 2020	¥2.3 billion	Develop thrust deflecting nozzle to achieve high maneuverability, reduce steering area and improve stealth
July 2015 - August 2015	Study on small heat transfer system for future fighters	Prototype: 2016 - 2019; Testing: 2018 - 2020	¥1.9 billion	Develop cooling system based on vapor cycle

In mid-September 2019, flight tests were conducted on integrated sensors to be used for the F-X. The sensors were tested on board an F-2 fighter and the results were said to be good.

==== F-X program and international collaboration ====
In March 2017, Japan and the U.K. signed an agreement to explore the possibility on co-developing a future fighter jet. By March 2018, a Japanese MoD representative had stated that the Japanese government was deciding whether to develop the F-X as a clean-sheet design, either domestically or through joint-development, or to develop an existing fighter design. That year, the Japanese government sent out proposals to the U.S. and U.K., seeking proposals for an upgrade of their existing designs. Boeing, Lockheed Martin, BAE Systems and Northrop Grumman all responded to the proposal. Boeing reportedly offered an upgraded fighter based on their F-15, while BAE systems offered a similar proposal based on the Eurofighter Typhoon. Lockheed Martin proposed a F-22/35 hybrid fighter while also offering Japan the majority of the work in developing and producing the aircraft. Northrop Grumman expressed interest in the project; with unconfirmed speculation that they might offer a modernised version of their YF-23. At the same time, Japan and U.K. also further explored the possibility on merging the F-X project with the Tempest project to some extent.

By October 2018, the MoD had begun to rule out the possibility of developing a fighter based on existing designs. Boeing's F-15 and BAE Systems' Eurofighter Typhoon reportedly failed to meet the ministry's requirements. Lockheed Martin's hybridised stealth fighter was also met with doubt due to its expensive price, as well as uncertainties that the U.S. would allow the sale given the export ban on the F-22. One report indicated that the hybrid fighter could cost as high as $177 million per aircraft.

In early February 2019, the MoD announced that a 'Japan-led' Future Fighter program would be initiated, with collaboration with foreign defense contractors still being an option. The announcement further enforced that plans to develop or locally produce an existing foreign design had been ruled out. The program would occur between 2019 and 2023, in line with the MoD's Mid-Term Defense Program and would take 15 years to complete; entering service around the time the F-2 would begin to retire. The MoD prioritised five key aspects for the program's development:

- Capability for future air superiority
- Potential to expand capability by incorporating next generation technologies
- Ability to modify and upgrade the new platform
- Participation of Japanese industry
- Affordable cost

On 21 August 2019, the MoD announced that development of the stealth fighter would commence between April and December 2020, in accordance to the FY 2020 defense budget. The funding that the MoD acquired would be used to initiate the fighter program. By December 2019, the MoD had secured ¥11.1 billion from the FY 2020 defense budget to launch the program. In total ¥28 billion was used to fund the F-X development for FY 2020. Of the total budget, ¥16.9 billion (60%) was to be used for research projects, while the remaining ¥11.1 billion (40%) was to launch the program and begin conceptional design. The FY 2020 defense budget also revealed the name of the program has been officially changed from "Future Fighter" to "F-X".

On 27 March 2020, Japan rejected further design proposed based on existing aircraft by Lockheed Martin, Boeing, and BAE Systems, based on a hybridised F-22/35, the F/A-18E/F Super Hornet, and Eurofighter Typhoon respectively. According to an official from the Acquisition, Technology & Logistics Agency (ATLA) the designs still did not meet Japanese requirements. However, the decision did not rule out the possibility of international collaboration; as Lockheed Martin, Boeing, Northrop Grumman and BAE Systems were still listed as potential partners. This was confirmed by an MoD spokesperson, who stated that Japan had developed enough technology to possibly develop the F-X domestically, but was still pursuing the option of international collaboration. On 1 April 2020, ATLA established a dedicated team to develop the F-X. The team was led by a major-general from the Japan Air Self-Defense Force (JASDF) and consisted of 30 JASDF officers, engineering officials and others. Subaru Corporation also announced that it would establish a Technology Development Center to support the F-X's development.

As of July 2020, the MoD expected production of the first fighter prototype to begin in 2024, with flight tests starting in 2028. Full-scale production was expected to commence by 2031.

In June 2021, Japan said that it was in discussions with British officials regarding cooperation with Rolls-Royce on engine development.

On 9 December 2022, the governments of Japan, the United Kingdom, and Italy jointly announced that they would develop and deploy a common fighter jet, merging their previously separate sixth-generation projects into the Global Combat Air Program. Japan's merger into this multinational effort effectively ended F-X as a separate fighter program.

== Design ==
=== Overview ===
The F-X was a twin engine stealth fighter focused on achieving air superiority. By the Japanese MoD's own terminology, the technology and capabilities the F-X possesses would classify it as a sixth generation fighter jet.

The F-X is said to have been bigger than the F-22, which earned it the nickname "Godzilla" from Bradley Perrett at Aviation Week. The large size indicated the MoD's desire for the aircraft to possess a very long range and large payload capacity without the need for external stores. Technologies tested in the X-2 technology demonstrator will now likely be incorporated GCAP. Defense Minister Taro Kono stated that the F-X would possess strong network capabilities and would carry more missiles than the F-35.

The design process for F-X pioneered the use of a 3-D digital mock-up system. Designs were based on the assumed function and performance of the F-X, and then installed in a research flight/battle simulator developed by the Technical Research Division Data on avionics, stealth and engine characteristics could be input into the simulator, and then rapidly tested by JASDF pilots. This allowed the effectiveness of changes to the mock-up design to be rapidly gauged and correlated synthetically, reducing cost and speeding up development.

Compared to its predecessor, the F-X replaced conventional hydraulic systems with electric actuators. According to the MoD's evaluation, this was done to simplify the complexity of managing the interior design of the fighter. When designing a stealth aircraft, the internal weapon bay and intake air-ducts must be accounted for. However, this can routing hydraulic piping through the airframe difficult due to design considerations such as rigidity and length. The adoption of electric actuators eliminates these constraints because they are only connected via electric wiring, which is much thinner and more flexible. This results in simplified installation and reduced restrictions, allowing more freedom in designing the body of the aircraft. Other advantages include weight reduction and improved mobility of the aircraft. The electric actuators were used in the fighter's flight control systems and undercarriage braking systems.

To achieve a lightweight body structure, the F-X implemented several technologies and manufacture/design techniques. One method involved reducing or eliminating the use of fasteners by bonding composite materials together through adhesive molding. This method was dubbed the "integrated/fastenerless structure" technology. Heat shield technology was placed around the engines to allow aluminum alloys and carbon-fiber reinforced polymer (CFRP) to be applied to reduce weight without being damaged by the engines' hot exhaust. High-efficiency/high-accuracy structural analysis techniques used for the F-X involved creating finite element method (FEM) models using computer-aided design (CAD) to create and study stress analysis standards for the F-X. The F-X's predecessor, the F-2, introduced integrated molding and CFRP material to reduce its overall weight, but the molding technique applied only on the bottom plates of the wings; requiring fasteners to be placed through the upper plates in the main wing and other areaed requiring fasteners on both plates. In comparison, the F-X expands the application of CFRP and adhesive molding to the entire fuselage. From the MoD's research, it was shown that adopting the new design methods reduce the theoretical structural mass of the F-X's airframe by 11.6%, and for a portion of the middle fuselage reduced working man-hours by 66% compared to conventional approaches.

To cope with the heat produced by the avionic systems, a small dedicated heat transfer system was designed into the F-X to assist its air cycle and liquid cooling system. The heat transfer system was modeled on the vapor-compression refrigeration cycle.

=== Avionics ===
To improve detection against stealth aircraft, the F-X planned to utilise integrated sensors. The sensors included an active electronically scanned array (AESA) radar, passive radio frequency (RF) sensor, and an infrared camera. Both the AESA radar and RF sensor utilised Gallium nitride (GaN) to improve its performance. The AESA radar was based on the J/APG-2 radar used on the F-2 fighter, similar to the AN/APG-81 radar used in the F-35.

The F-X would have possessed a RF 'self-defense' system to counter aircraft, air-to-air missile and surface-to-air missile threats. The system performs both ESM and ECM by being alerted to the threat and disrupting its radio waves instantly and globally. Integrated ESM body antennas would have been placed along the wing and tail flap of the fighter jet.

=== Cockpit ===
The helmet-mounted display featured a wide field of vision, binocular, multi-color display, voice recognition and 3-D sound.

=== Stealth ===
To minimize its radar cross section, F-X physical design featured serpentine air-ducts and an internal weapons bay. Electromagnetic wave absorbers were applied to the air-ducts and engines to reduce the amount of radar reflection. The absorber was said to be of carbon-based material. According to results of tests conducted, the RCS reduction done from the absorbers had the equivalent effect of reducing detection range from a given radar threat by about half. Metamaterials were also used to reflect radio waves. The metamaterials consisted of various materials including small pieces of metals and dielectrics. The metamaterials were to be applied on the pulse doppler system as part of a radio wave reflection control technology on board the F-X.

To avoid having its radar emissions detected, the F-X maximised its usage of passive detection. Its sensor programs also operated its radar emissions in a way that reduced the likelihood of counter detection during radar emissions.

The F-X planned to use plasma stealth antenna technology to deflect radio waves. This type of antenna operates by creating temporary plasma using characteristics of plasma that can change physical properties through electrical control. While activated the antenna would also be capable of transmitting and receiving communication.

=== Engine ===
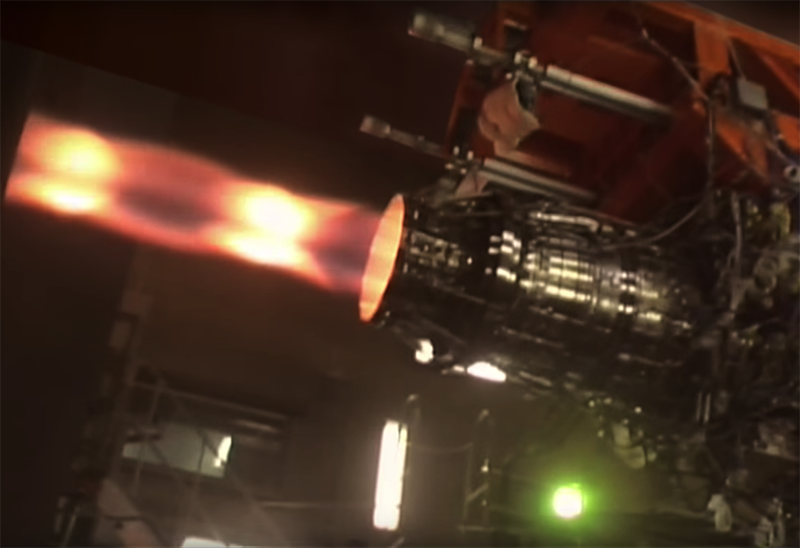
XF9-1 on a test run

Early in development the F-X was to be powered by two XF9 engines. In 2018, the officially publicized thrust level of the prototype engine was "11 tons (107 kN / 24,000 lbf) or more" in military thrust and "15 tons (147 kN / 33,000 lbf) or more" with afterburner. The XF9 is designed to be adaptable to a wide range of thrust level, higher or lower, depending on requirement; and the future fighter engine program is conducted with a target maximum thrust of 20 tons (196 kN / 44,000 lbf) in mind, which was unveiled at the ATLA Technology Symposium 2018. The XF9 possesses a high combustion temperature at 1800 °C. Noteworthy of the XF9 is its slim size relative to its power. For instance, the engine inlet of the XF9 is 30% smaller than the General Electric F110 used on the F-2. The slim design is needed in order to accommodate weapons internally to preserve the aircraft's stealth. The XF9 has a large electrical power output of 180 kW, thus could have provided 360 kW combined from both of its engines. The large energy generation is needed to supply the fighter's powerful avionics and equipment. The engines incorporate three dimensional thrust vector nozzles to allow the aircraft to achieve high maneuverability and improve stealth capabilities. The engine's thrust vector nozzle can deflect thrust up to 20 degrees in all circumference directions.

December 2021 a memorandum was signed between Japan and the UK to co-operate on producing a joint demonstrator design for a sixth generation aircraft engine through engine manufacturers IHI and Rolls-Royce, a joint viability study had been underway for a while. Japan's defense ministry said efforts would commence in its next financial year, which began on April 1, 2022. Later the Italian manufacturer Avio Aero joined as a partner on the engine development.

=== Armaments ===
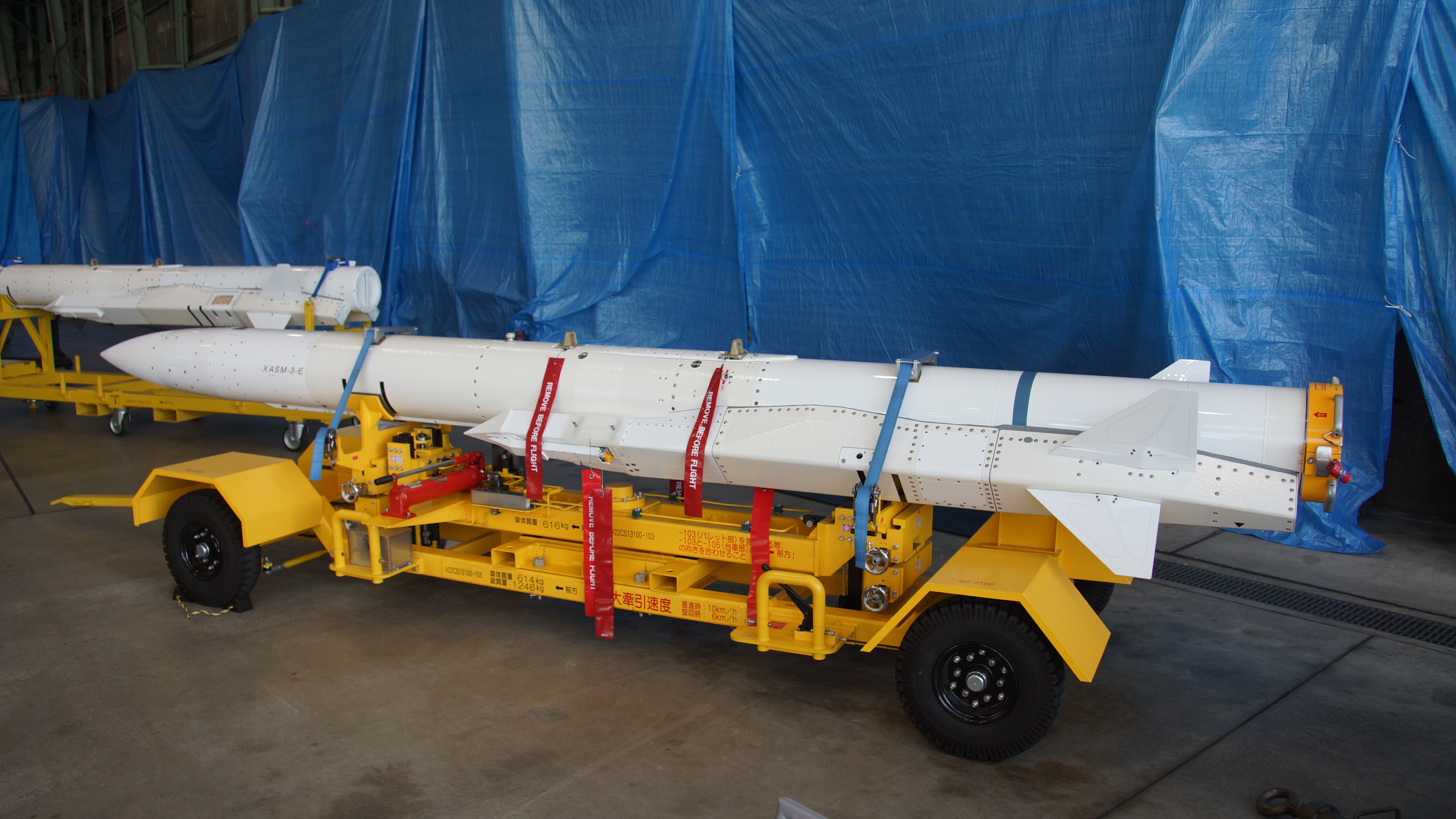
ASM-3 anti-ship missile

The ASM-3 has been developed for the F-X to use as the F-2 gets phased out. The F-X will be armed with a microwave weapon to disrupt incoming missiles. The microwave weapon is activated from the stealth fighter's AESA radar through the use of electron tube amplifiers capable of high efficiency and miniaturization.

=== Drone control ===
Japan plans on introducing unmanned combat aerial vehicles that can operate alongside the F-X, called the Combat Support Unmanned Aircraft. The drone program is similar to the Kratos XQ-58 Valkyrie or Boeing Airpower Teaming System project in which the drone acts as a "loyal wingman" to the controlling aircraft. There are two versions of the drone: one that is a sensor carrier and scouts for targets, and another that fires munitions and directs incoming missiles away from the parent aircraft. Both versions share the same design as each other. The drones are expected to be fully developed by the 2030s.

== Significance and issues ==
=== Domestic industry ===
Within Japan, the development of the X-2 and the F-X is seen as chance for Japan to revitalize its defense/aerospace industry and establish a foothold within the international arms market. In the aftermath following World War II, Japan's defense and aerospace sector was crushed, forcing the nation to enter a long period of rebuilding. As a result, Japan mostly built US made aircraft under license to sustain its industry, while historically struggled to produce their own domestically design aircraft, both civilian and military alike. The F-2 fighter in particular was widely controversial in Japan. First conceived as a 'pure' Japanese fighter, the F-2 was to incorporate the latest technology Japan had to offer and become a sort of spiritual successor to the famous Mitsubishi A6M Zero. However, the decision to joint-develop the aircraft with the US was later chosen due to a combination of US political pressure and the heavy undertaking of producing a fighter domestically. Combined with the delays and lack of profit and growth obtained for Japan's domestic industries, the F-2 went on to become an expensive, controversial fighter. As such, with the introduction of the F-X, Japanese lawmakers and defense officials are adamant in avoiding a repeat of the F-2's controversial development.

Domestic development is generally favored the most by defense industry groups and lawmakers but the expected high cost and inexperience developing a domestic fighter are among the biggest challenges faced with domestic development. International collaboration is seen as another option with the benefit of easing the financial burden but can lead to difficulties in coordinating with the partner/s of the project. Furthermore, Japanese lawmakers are adamant that domestic companies should lead the project to secure profit and preserve the defense industry. Air Marshal B.K. Pandey, former Air Officer Commanding-in-Chief of Training Command of the Indian Air Force, noted that the F-X will likely face technological challenges as the technologies used in fighter jets have become more complex over the years.

=== Foreign collaboration ===
According to Gregg Rubinstein of Carnegie Endowment for International Peace, the US and Japan have differing approaches and priorities on joint-developing the stealth fighter. US defense officials emphasized that operational concepts and capability requirements should be the basis for fighter acquisition. In contrast, the Japanese officials have prioritized technology development and industrial base interest. In addition, the bitter legacy of the F-2 casts a shadow over discussions between the two countries. In light of the F-2, there are concerns that Japan will be unable to have control of its partnership with the US.

At the same time, military cooperation between the UK and Japan has expanded over the years. Discussions on joint-development between both countries have been described as "open-minded and flexible". Gregg Rubinstein has also noted that both countries have developed an interest in each other; noting that in a post-Brexit environment Britain will be looking beyond the EU for partners and Japan will desire to gain some independence from the US for its domestic industry. However, this increased cooperation elicited some reactions from the US. In mid-April 2019, several reports indicated that the U.S. was willing to disclose portions of the F-35's software to Japan in exchange for joint development on the F-X fighter. These reports stated the offer was made in response to outdo 'rival' Britain in securing a deal with Japan. According to the Financial Times, there were concerns among US officials that Japan would select BAE Systems as its international partner over US defense contractors. As a result, the Trump administration reportedly exerted political pressure on Japan to joint-develop the F-X with the US. There were concerns that selecting a British fighter jet would increase interoperability difficulties between it and the US military and US-made aircraft in Japan, thus complicating joint operations. Another was that selecting the UK would anger then-President Trump amidst a cost-sharing dispute regarding stationing US forces in Japan. Nikkei Asian Review noted in 2020 that between choosing the UK or US as a partner, the UK would offer greater flexibility for Japan in developing the F-X while Japan still places high importance on its alliance with the US. In early March 2020, a report from Nikkei Asian Review indicated that Japan planned on selecting the US for collaboration despite the ongoing discussions between Japan and the US and UK at the time of the reporting. While ATLA responded by stating that US and UK discussions were still ongoing, the report suggested that the US still has a strong influence over Japan because of their alliance. On 25 August 2020, Japan's defense minister stated that "[Japan is] currently exchanging information with the US and UK to deepen our consideration of international co-operation in this development project."

=== Geopolitical ===
The development of the F-X allows Japan to catch up to and counter Russian and Chinese stealth fighters.

The F-X was also designed primarily in response to concerns of Chinese, North Korean, and Russian military threats. Japan MoD considers China's rapid military buildup and disputes in the East and South China Sea as a primary security concern; along with North Korea's nuclear weapons program and Russia's increased military activities. With regards to China, the F-X would likely be used to counter advanced Chinese fighter jets: Shenyang J-11, Chengdu J-20, and Shenyang FC-31. Experts believe that the stealth jet would likely unnerve China to Japan's increased militarization.

Japan's development of the F-X, along with China, India and South Korea's stealth fighter programs, are noted as an increased trend of Asian aerospace industries challenging Western and Russian dominance in the global fighter jet industry. As of 2018, 90% of combat aircraft flown in all of the world's air forces comes from the US, USSR/Russia, Britain, France and Sweden. If the F-X (along with other fighter jets) is successfully designed then the focus of the fighter jet industry could shift from the Northern Atlantic closer to the Asia-Pacific. If it is exported, it could potentially become a serious challenge to the West's predominance in the fighter industry.

== See also ==
- BAE Systems Tempest ― Merged into the: Global Combat Air Program
- F/A-XX program
- Future Combat Air System
- Global Combat Air Program
- Mikoyan PAK DP
- Next Generation Air Dominance
