= IHI Corporation F7 =

2000s Japanese turbofan aircraft engine

F7
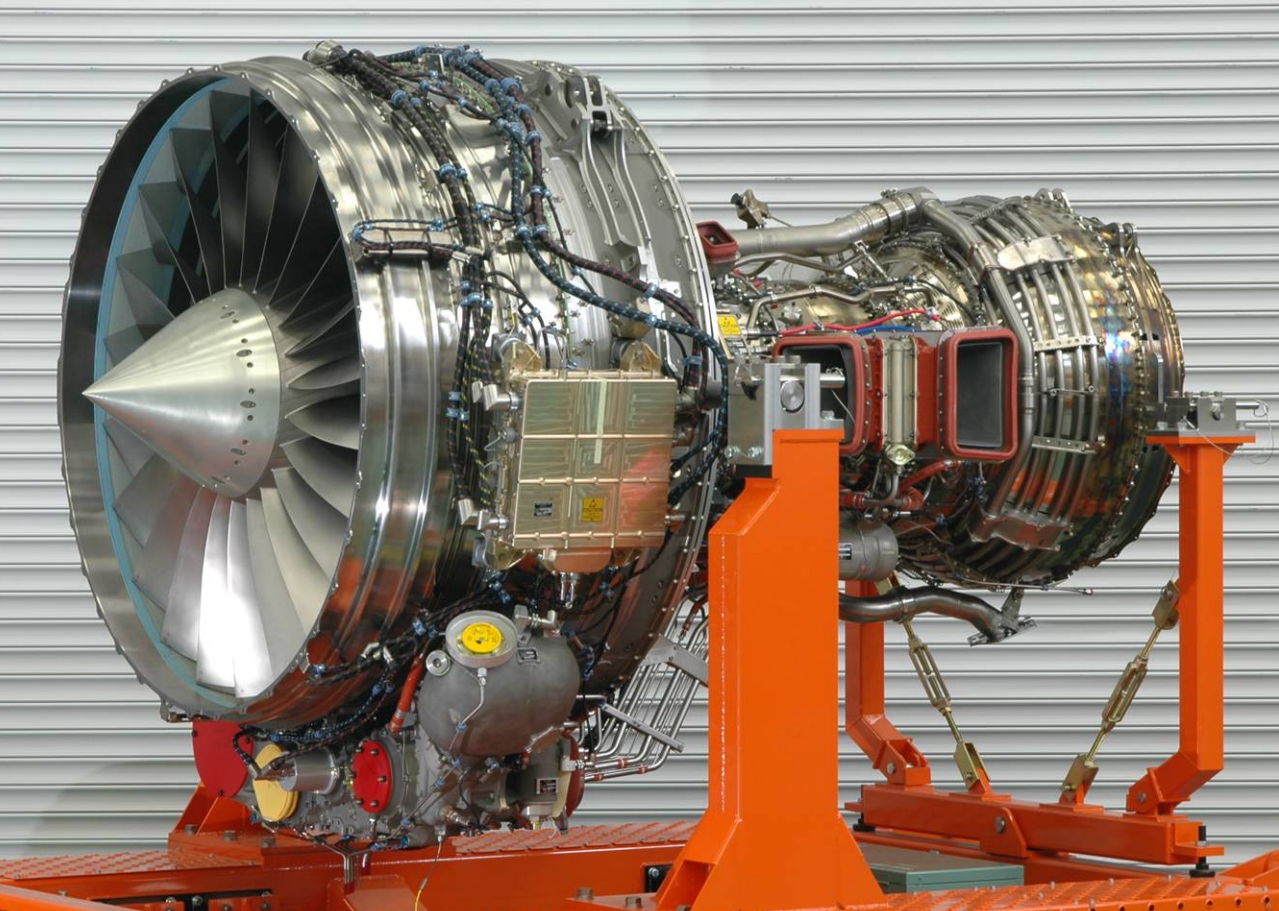
- Type: Turbofan
- National origin: Japan
- Manufacturer: IHI Corporation
- First run: 2000s
- Major applications: Kawasaki P-1

The IHI Corporation F7 is a small turbofan engine developed specifically for the Kawasaki P-1 maritime patrol aircraft by IHI Corporation.

== Development ==
IHI started development work on the high bypass ratio turbofan engine in 1998, based on the low bypass ratio engine XF5-1. and the first prototype XF7-1 was tested from 2000 to 2002. The flight test XF7-10's testing started in 2002.

XF7-10's PFRT (Preliminary Flight Rating Test) started in second quarter 2002, and was completed August 2007 before the XP-1 first flight. PFRT was based on the Military Specification MIL-E-5007D and the original standard about the FADEC system.

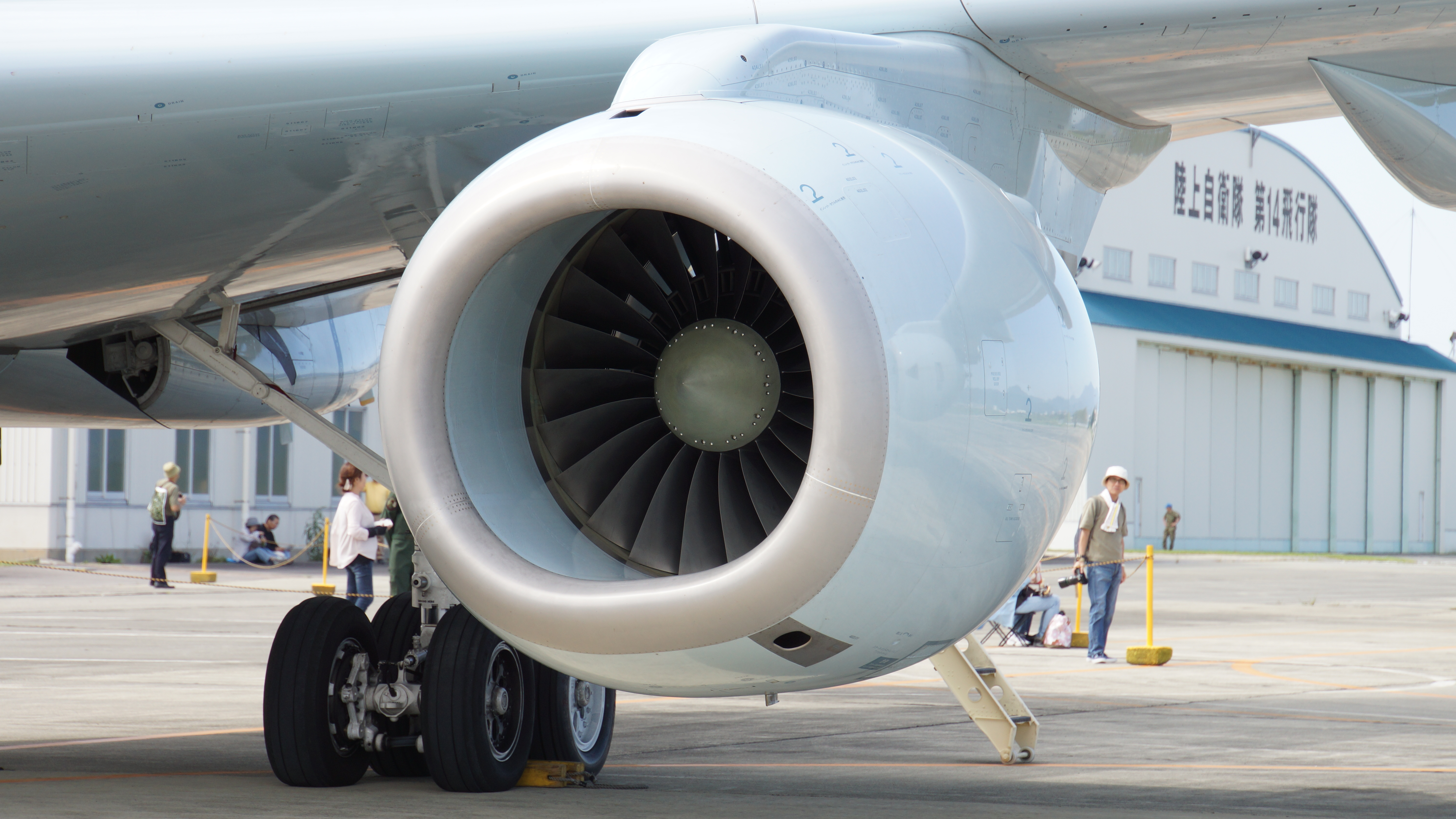
An F7-10 engine mounted on the P-1.

Take off thrust is 60 kN (13,000 lb_{f}), bypass ratio is 8.2, and SFC is 0.34 kg/h/daN. Exhaust emission is under the ICAO's standard, NOx is 54%, CO is 33%, UHC is 0.5%, smoke is 74% when standard is 100%.

Strong alloy materials were selected for high corrosion resistance in salt environments, and a sound absorbing panel is mounted. Noise level is 5~10dB lower than P-3's T56, measurements is 76 dB when idling, 70.6 dB at take off.

P-1's F7-10 is installed thrust reversal with GE's cowl opening systems.

== Variants ==
- XF7-1: early prototype, rated at 12,000 lbf (53 kN).
- XF7-10: flight prototype with up to 13,500 lbf (60 kN) thrust.
- F7-10: serial production.

== Applications ==
- Kawasaki P-1

== Specifications (F7-10) ==
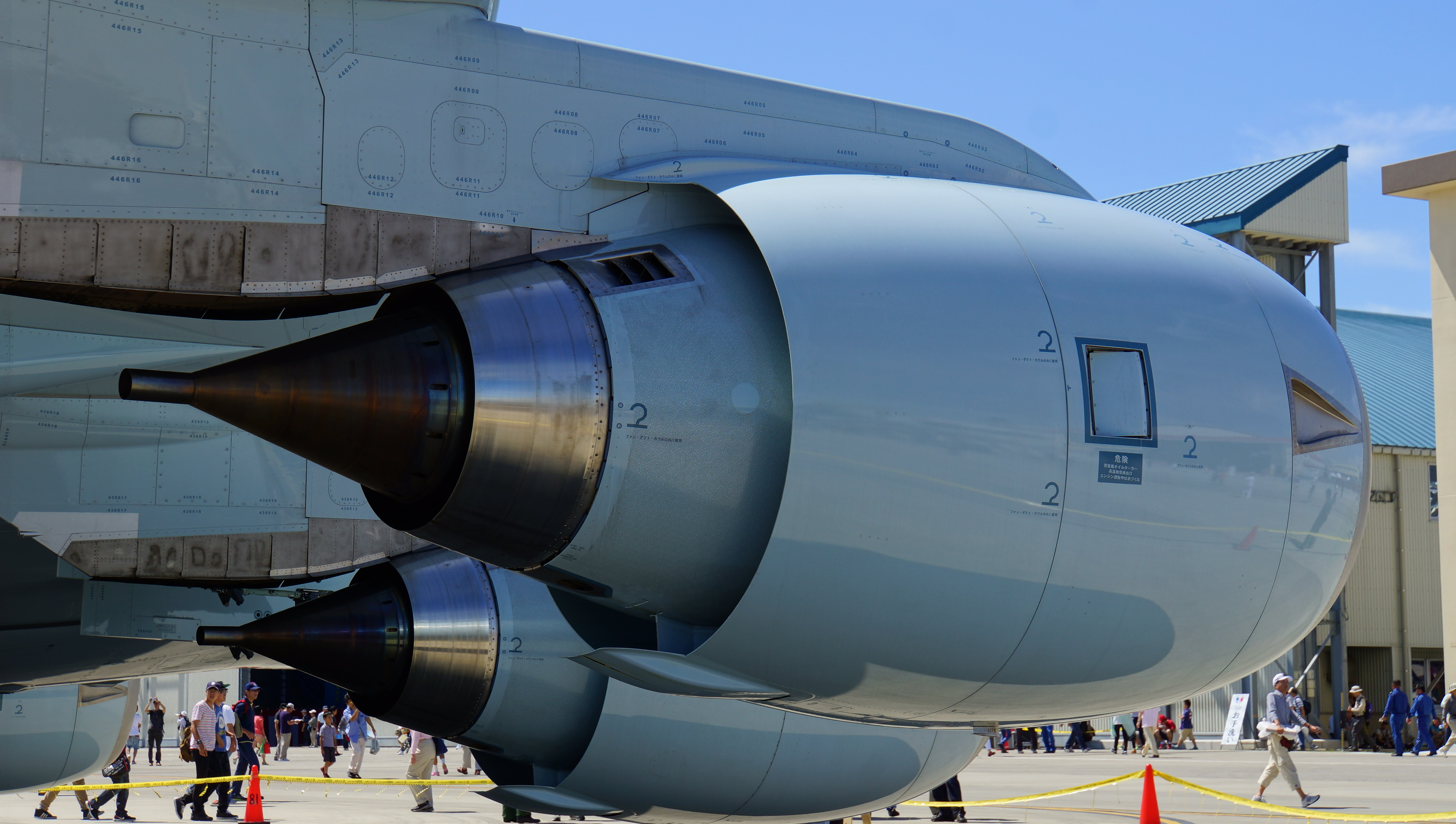
The cowling and nozzle of the F7 engines.

==== General characteristics ====
- Type: Turbofan
- Length: 2.7 m (8 ft 10 in)
- Diameter: 1.4 m (4 ft 7 in) (Fan)
- Dry weight: 1,240 kg (2,730 lb)

==== Components ====
- Compressor: 1-stage fan, 2-stage low pressure compressor, 8-stage high pressure compressor axial
- Combustors: annular
- Turbine: 2-stage high pressure turbine, 4-stage low pressure turbine

==== Performance ====
- Maximum thrust: 60 kN (13,000 lbf)
- Overall pressure ratio: Fan Pressure Ratio=1.6:1;Overall Pressure Ratio=27:1
- Bypass ratio: 8.2:1
- Turbine inlet temperature: 1,500 deg C rated

== See also ==
Related development

- IHI F3
- IHI XF5
- IHI XF9

Related lists

- List of aircraft engines
