= IHI Corporation XF5 =

2010s Japanese turbofan aircraft engine

XF5
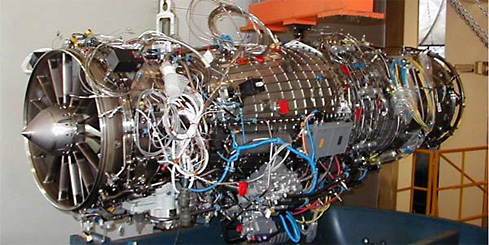
- Type: Turbofan
- National origin: Japan
- Manufacturer: IHI Corporation
- Major applications: Mitsubishi X-2 Shinshin

The Ishikawajima-Harima Heavy Industries (IHI) XF5 is a low bypass turbofan engine developed in Japan by Ishikawajima-Harima Heavy Industries for the Mitsubishi X-2 Shinshin (ATD-X).

== Applications ==
- Mitsubishi X-2 Shinshin

== Specifications (XF5-1) ==
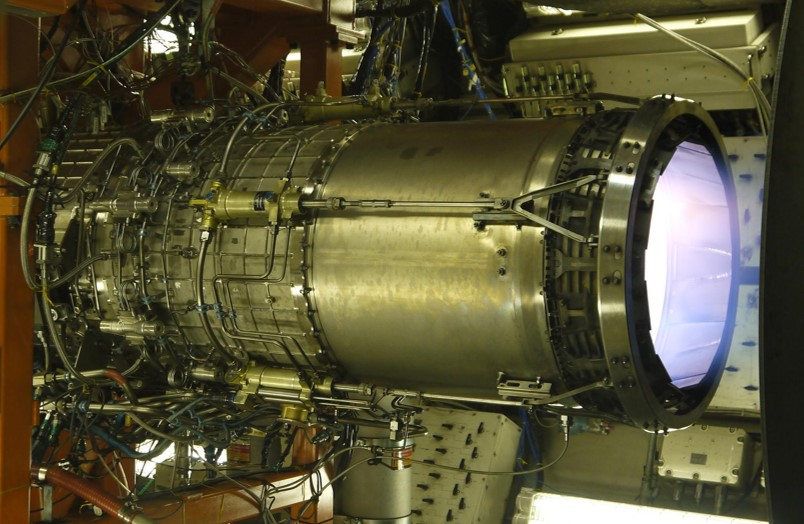
XF5-1 engine undergoes performance testing

Data from

==== General characteristics ====
- Type: afterburning turbofan
- Length: 3 m (120 in)
- Diameter: 61 cm (24 in)
- Dry weight: 644 kg (1,420 lb)

==== Components ====
- Compressor: axial, 3 stage fan, 6 compressor stage
- Combustors: annular
- Turbine: 1 stage high pressure turbine, 1 stage low pressure turbine

==== Performance ====
- Maximum thrust: 49 kilonewtons (11,000 lbf) with afterburner
- Overall pressure ratio: 26:1
- Turbine inlet temperature: 1,600 °C
- Thrust-to-weight ratio: 7.8

== See also ==
Related development

- Ishikawajima-Harima F3
- IHI Corporation F7
- IHI Corporation XF9

Comparable engines

- HAL HTFE-25
- Honeywell/ITEC F124
- Ivchenko-Progress AI-322
- Rolls-Royce Turbomeca Adour
- TEI-TF6000

Related lists

- List of aircraft engines
