= Mitsubishi X-2 Shinshin =

Japanese experimental stealth aircraft

X-2 Shinshin
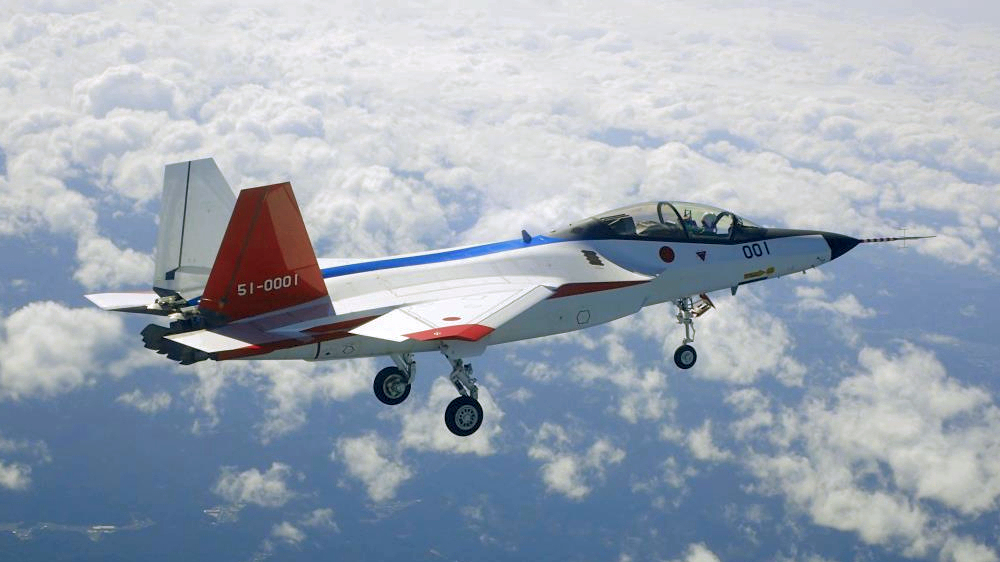
- X-2 during its maiden flight

General information
- Type: Stealth experimental technology demonstrator
- National origin: Japan
- Manufacturer: Mitsubishi Heavy Industries
- Status: Completed
- Primary user: Japan Air Self-Defense Force
- Number built: 1 prototype

History
- Manufactured: 2009–2016
- Introduction date: 2016
- First flight: 22 April 2016
- Developed into: Global Combat Air Programme

The Mitsubishi X-2 Shinshin (三菱 X-2 心神, formerly the ATD-X) is a Japanese experimental aircraft for testing advanced stealth fighter aircraft technologies. It was developed by the Japanese Ministry of Defense Technical Research and Development Institute (TRDI) for research purposes while the project's prime contractor is the Japanese conglomerate Mitsubishi Heavy Industries. It is commonly considered to be Japan's first domestically made stealth fighter. ATD-X is an abbreviation for "Advanced Technology Demonstrator – X". The aircraft is widely known in Japan as Shinshin (心神; meaning "mind" or "spirit.") although the name itself is an early code name within the Japan Self-Defense Forces and is not officially in use.

Following the rebuffing of Japanese interest in the prospective procurement of the Lockheed Martin F-22 Raptor fighter aircraft, the Japanese Government resolved to develop the technologies towards a future combat aircraft. These technologies are not limited to only stealth-related features but to other advanced systems, including 3-D thrust vectoring, a fly-by-optics flight control system, and an active electronically scanned array (AESA) radar. Following preliminary work with flyable scale models, construction activity commenced at Mitsubishi's Komaki South Plant in 2009. The official unveiling of the resultant aircraft, X-2 Shinshin, was performed in January 2016; it made its maiden flight on 22 April 2016.

The X-2 programme has led to the start-up of the Mitsubishi F-X sixth-generation fighter program, as well as Japan's involvement in the Global Combat Air Programme. It is intended that these programmes should ultimately yield a next-generation fighter aircraft that would be procured and operated by the Japan Air Self Defense Force.

== Development ==
=== Background and early work ===
At the beginning of the twenty-first century, Japan, seeking to replace its ageing fleet of fighter aircraft, made a series of overtures to the United States on the topic of purchasing several Lockheed Martin F-22 Raptor fighter aircraft. However, the U.S. Congress had banned the exporting of the aircraft in order to safeguard secrets of the aircraft's technology such as its extensive use of stealth; this rejection necessitated Japan to develop its own modern fighter, to be equipped with stealth features and other advanced systems.

Accordingly, Japan began to explore domestic options for producing a new generation fighter aircraft. In 2005, a mock-up stealth aircraft was shipped to France to undergo radar cross section (RCS) testing. During 2006, a radio-controlled 1/5th scale model made its first flight to gain data on performance at high angles of attack and to test new sensory equipment and self-repairing flight control systems. Following these preliminary steps, the decision was taken in 2007 to proceed with the multi billion-yen project. At the time of this decision, production was forecast to start roughly ten years later, around 2017. In 2007, the ATD-X was openly expected to conduct its maiden flight in 2014. Four year later, the projected date for the maiden flight was still set to take place during either 2014 or 2015.

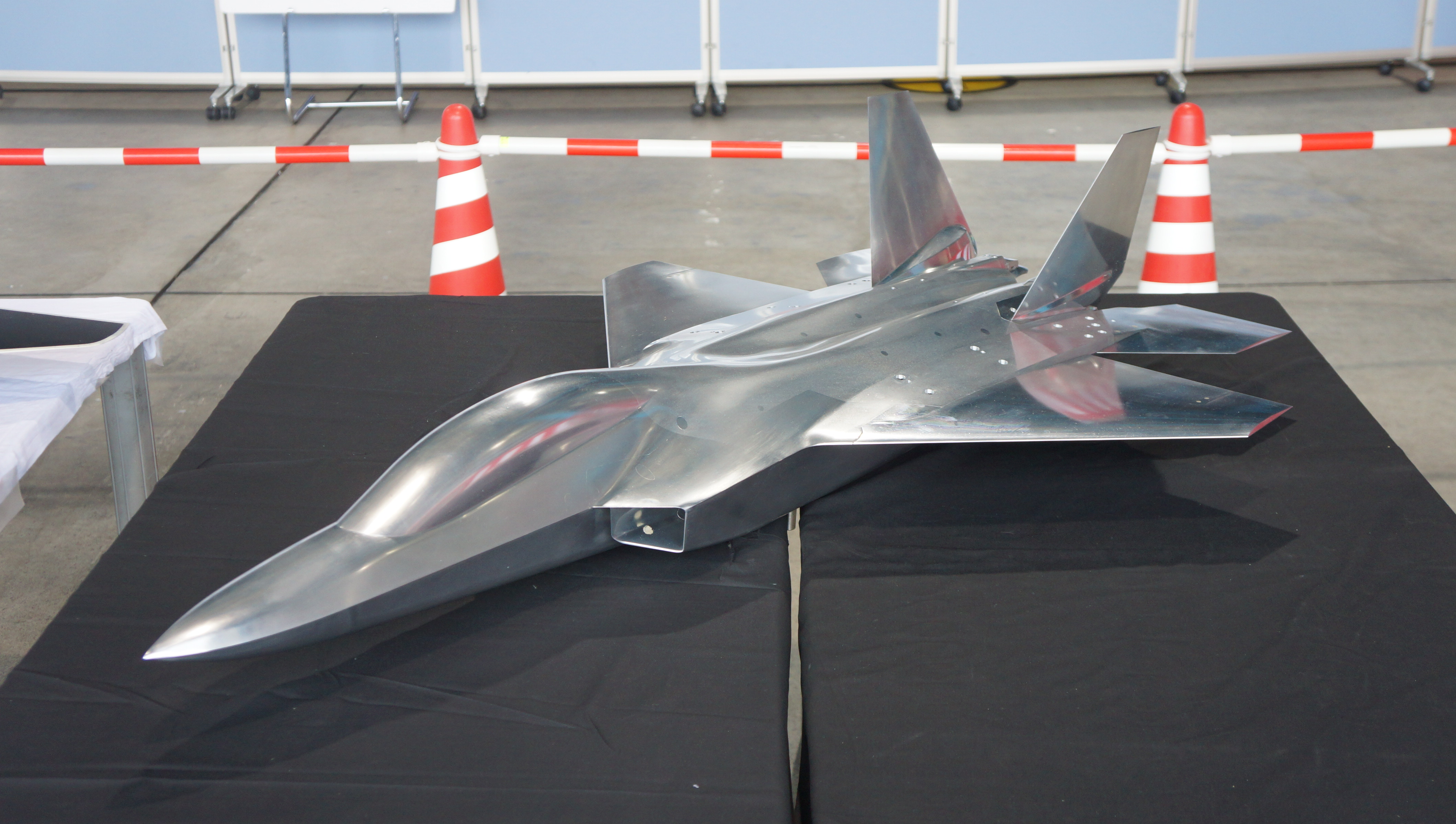
Model of ATD-X

During 2009, construction activity on the programme was launched at Mitsubishi's Komaki South Plant under the supervision of the Acquisition, Technology & Logistics Agency (ATLA) of the Defense Ministry. Furthermore, technical assistance was reported to have been provided by the American defence company Lockheed Martin at some stage of the programme. In total, the programme involved 220 subcontractors while 90 percent of the ATD-X’s components were domestically manufactured. Access to US testing facilities was reportedly denied. The total cost of the programme were projected to be 39.4 billion yen (roughly $331 million).

In July 2014, the TRDI (Technical Research & Development Institute) released the first official photos of the ATD-X prototype, and stated that the aircraft was undergoing ground testing. The fighter prototype was expected to be fully developed by 2018. The ATD-X program was intended to lead onto the Mitsubishi F-3, which was intended to incorporate sixth-generation technology into a production fighter aircraft, and was at one point expected to be produced in 2027. Several issues were encountered during the development of the X-2, particularly with its engine control software.

The ATD-X prototype was officially unveiled on 29 January 2016. At the time, the aircraft's first flight was expected to take place during the following month; it carried the X-2 official military designation at the unveiling.

=== Into flight ===
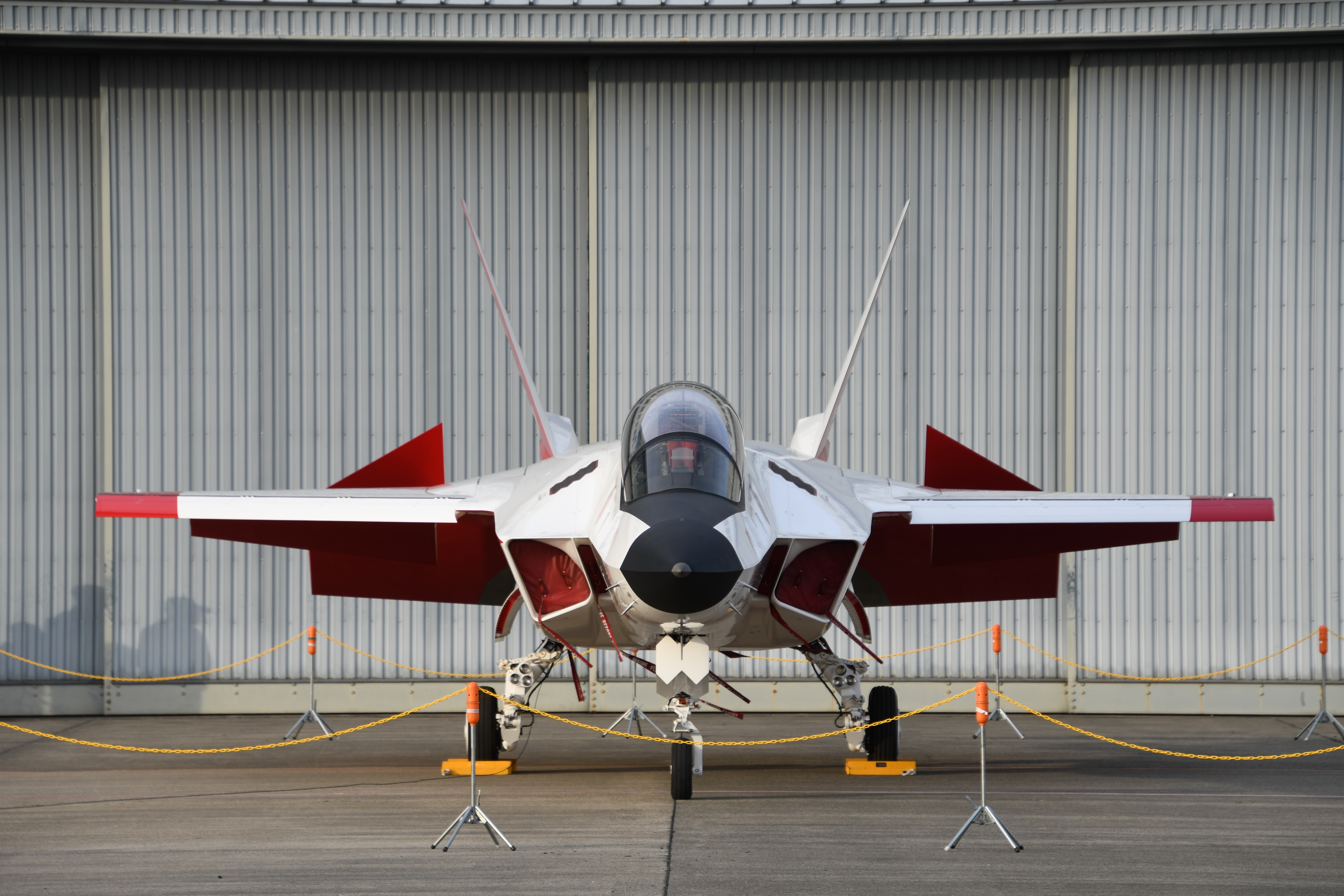
Head-on view of the X-2

On 22 April 2016, the X-2 performed its maiden flight from Nagoya Airfield; following a 26 minute flight, it landed at the JASDF's Gifu Air Field. The unusually prolonged period between structural completion and first flight has not been fully explained. The Jiji News Agency reported that the X-2 has a take-off weight of 13,000 kg (28,700 lb); Japanese media reported its weight as nine tonnes (9,000 kg; 20,000 lb), which was relatively heavy for a demonstrator of these dimensions, being 9.1 metres (30 ft) span and 14.2 metres (47 ft) long.

In late November 2017, ATLA announced that the testing of the X-2 will be concluded in March 2018. By the time of this announcement, the aircraft had completed 34 sorties out of the original 50 planned flights. By March 2018, reports emerged that ATLA was not set to request further funding for the X-2, and that government interest was increasingly focused on forming agreements with other international partners to either jointly develop a next-generation fighter or to directly purchase such aircraft from an overseas party.

By July 2018, Japan had reportedly gleaned sufficient information from the X-2's flight tests for a determination and decided that it would need to bring on board international partners to complete this project. Several companies have responded, including Lockheed Martin (which reportedly offered an updated version of the F-22 Raptor), the British aerospace company BAE Systems (which reportedly entered talks about towards what has since become the Global Combat Air Programme), and the American aircraft firm Northrop Grumman (which was speculated to have offered a modernized version of the YF-23).

The X-2's development and maiden flight made Japan to become the fourth nation in the world to develop and test-fly their own stealth jet (after the United States, Russia and China), helping to revitalize Japan's defense and aerospace industries and to stay competitive with regional powers China and South Korea that are also developing their own stealth fighters. Prior to the X-2 and the 2014 easing of arms export restrictions, Japan's defense industry stagnated because the arms export ban prevented Japan from exporting weapons or participating in any joint development with another country, with the exception being the United States. This in turn slowed the growth of Japan's defense and aerospace industries, as the lack of military aircraft development means that procurement of certain aircraft are sought elsewhere from foreign defense contractors. The X-2 is thus seen as having potential to reinvigorate Japan's aerospace and defense industry. According to Hideaki Watanabe, head of the Acquisition, Technology & Logistics Agency (ATLA), the X-2 can be used to give Japan more bargaining power in future joint development projects because of its technological advancement. There is also potential that technologies developed from the X-2 can be transferred and used for civilian applications as the Mitsubishi F-2 has done prior. The F-2 introduced the first usage of carbon fiber reinforced polymer (CFRP) and Active electronically scanned array (AESA) radar on a fighter aircraft. CFRP material would later be used for the Boeing 787 Dreamliner and while the AESA radar technology would help produce electronic toll collection system.

== Design ==
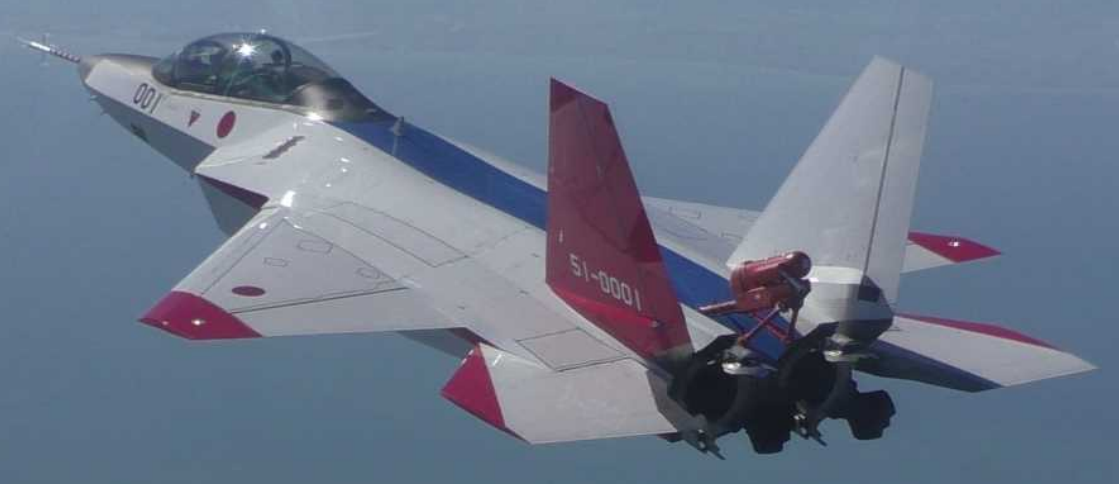
X-2 in-flight, 2017

The X-2 was flown as a technology demonstrator and research prototype with the primary goal of to determining whether domestic advanced technologies for a fifth generation fighter aircraft were viable. To minimize the aircraft's radar cross-section (RCS), the fuselage was specifically shaped, its surface featuring a mixture of sawtooth edges, chines and irregular curves. Instead of focusing on radiation-absorbent material (RAM), the X-2 is primarily composed of a non-reflective composite material that consists of both ceramic and silicon carbide that was developed by the Japanese chemical specialist Ube Industries. The bubble canopy enclosing the cockpit is coated with a special tin alloy. The aircraft incorporates a serpentine shaped air intake duct to further suppress radar reflection. According to Hideaki Miwa of the Defense Ministry's procurement agency, the X-2's RCS is "no bigger than a giant beetle viewed from tens of kilometers away".

The X-2 was powered by a pair of IHI Corporation XF5 low-bypass turbofan engines during its test flight programme. These were the first Japanese-built engines to be equipped with afterburners, and were primarily composed of a combination of heat-resistant ceramic matrix composite and titanium aluminide alloy. The exhaust nozzle of each engine is equipped with three paddles (similar to the arrangement used on the experimental Rockwell X-31) that allow it redirect thrust three-dimensionally (both vertically and horizontally), providing the X-2 with a 3-D thrust vectoring capability for enhanced manoeuvrability. Furthermore, due to the X-2’s relatively low overall weight, the engines could accelerate the aircraft to speeds in excess of double the speed of sound; it could also sustain supersonic flight without the use of afterburners, a capability known as supercruise. At one point in development, an axis-symmetric thrust vectoring engine was also being worked on for the envisioned production standard derivative of the aircraft.

Among the planned features of the X-2 is a fly-by-optics flight control system, which by replacing traditional wires with optical fibers, allows data to be transferred faster and with immunity to electromagnetic disturbance. A further feature will be a so-called 'Self Repairing Flight Control Capability' (自己修復飛行制御機能), which will allow the aircraft to automatically detect failures or damage in its flight control surfaces, and using the remaining control surfaces, calibrate accordingly to retain controlled flight. Sensors include an active electronically scanned array (AESA) radar referred to as the 'Multifunction RF Sensor', which is intended to have broad spectrum agility, capabilities for electronic countermeasures (ECM), electronic support measures (ESM), communications functions, and possibly even microwave weapon functions.

== Specifications (X-2) ==
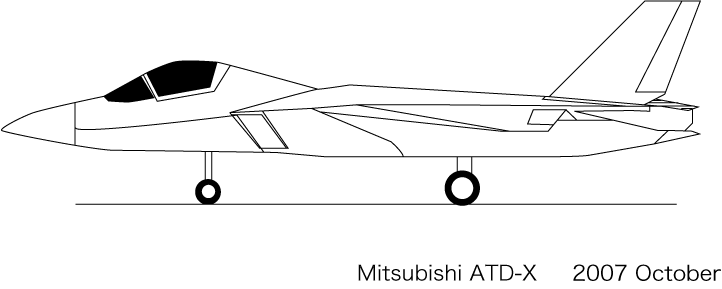
Mitsubishi X-2

Data from Mitsubishi Heavy Industries, Japanese Ministry of Defense, Jane's Defence Weekly

General characteristics

- Crew: 1
- Length: 14.174 m (46 ft 6 in)
- Wingspan: 9.099 m (29 ft 10 in)
- Height: 4.514 m (14 ft 10 in)
- Empty weight: 9,700 kg (21,385 lb)
- Max takeoff weight: 13,000 kg (28,660 lb)
- Powerplant: 2 × IHI XF5-1 low-bypass turbofans, 49.03 kN (11,023 lbf) with afterburner

Performance

- Maximum speed: Mach 2.25, (Mach 1.28 supercruise)
- Range: 2,900 km (1,800 mi, 1,566 nmi)
- Combat range: 761 km (473 mi, 411 nmi)
- Ferry range: 3,200 km (1,988 mi, 1,728 nmi)

== See also ==
Aircraft of comparable role, configuration, and era

- HAL AMCA
- KAI KF-21 Boramae
- Lockheed Martin F-35 Lightning II
- Mikoyan LMFS
- Sukhoi Su-75 Checkmate
- Shenyang FC-31
- TAI TF-X

Related lists

- List of fighter aircraft
