= IHI Corporation XF9 =

2010s Japanese turbofan aircraft engine

XF9
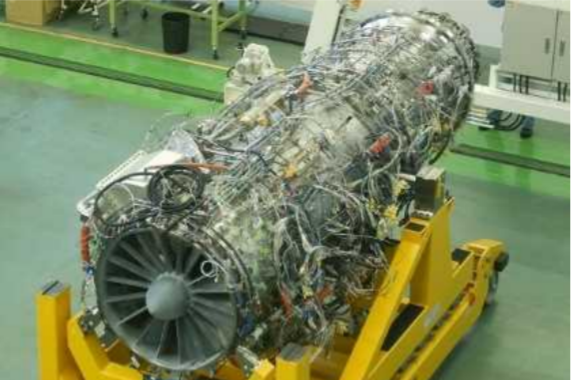
- XF9-1 prototype engine
- Type: Turbofan
- National origin: Japan
- Manufacturer: IHI Corporation

The IHI XF9 is a low-bypass afterburning turbofan engine developed by the Acquisition, Technology & Logistics Agency (ATLA) of Ministry of Defense of Japan (MoD) and IHI Corporation.

== Overview ==
The XF9 is a product of an ATLA project Research on fighter engine system (2015–2019) which followed two preliminary projects, Research on main components of next generation engines (2010–2015) and Research on fighter engine elements (2013–2017). Started after development of the XF5 turbofan engine (1995–2008), these research projects are preliminary works for Japan's future fighter program or the successor to the Mitsubishi F-2 fighter.

The basic concept is to produce a "slim and high-power" engine, thereby creating more capacity for accommodating fuel and weaponry inside the fuselage of a stealth fighter to reduce radar cross-section. The concept, dubbed High-power Slim Engine, also appears in an MoD report titled A vision for research and development of future fighter aircraft (2010) as the powerplant for a conceptual Japanese future fighter, the i^{3} FIGHTER.

While its predecessor, the XF5, was a small engine, the XF9-1 prototype is close to the General Electric F110 in size, and is comparable to the Pratt & Whitney F119 in terms of thrust class. With the core that withstands 2,073 K (1,800°C) class Turbine Inlet Temperature, the XF9-1 produces a high thrust, improving fuel economy at the same time. As of 2018, the officially publicized thrust level of the prototype is "11 tons (107 kN / 24,000 lbf) or more" in military thrust and "15 tons (147 kN / 33,000 lbf) or more" with afterburner. The XF9 is designed to be adaptable to a wide range of thrust level, higher or lower, depending on requirement; and the future fighter engine program is conducted with a target maximum thrust of 20 tons (196 kN / 44,000 lbf) in mind, which was unveiled at the ATLA Technology Symposium 2018.

== Technical features ==
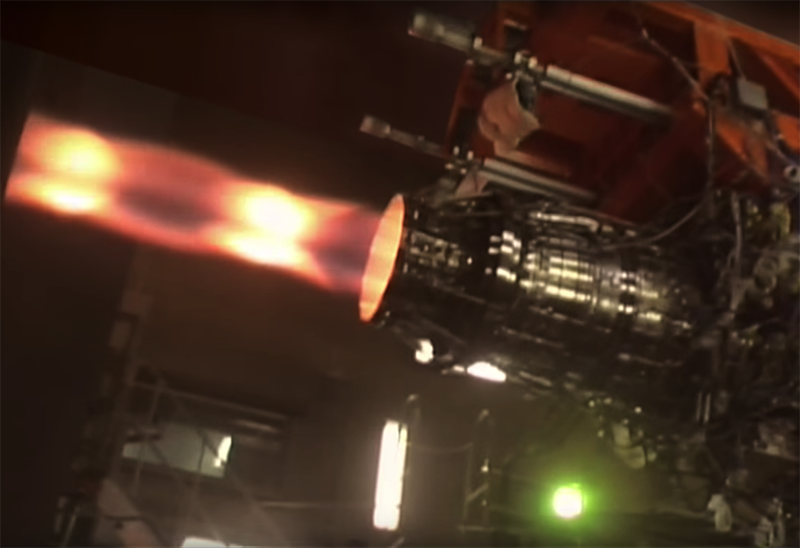
XF9-1 on a test run

The XF9-1 is a twin-spool axial-flow afterburning turbofan with a dual redundant FADEC, consisting of a 3-stage fan, a 6-stage high-pressure compressor, an annular type combustor, a single-stage high-pressure turbine, a single-stage low-pressure turbine, an afterburner, and a convergent-divergent nozzle. The concept, slim and high-power, resulted in an approximately 30% higher thrust per unit cross-sectional area compared to the GE F110 the Mitsubishi F-2 is equipped with. To achieve this thrust level, a higher combustion temperature (1,800°C class) and an optimized aerodynamic design were needed, which in turn required advanced material, manufacturing, cooling and fluid analysis technologies.

Each of the rotors is a blisk to contribute to weight reduction and downsizing. The combustor is equipped with patented new-type burners, Wide-angle Swirler, to facilitate stable combustion and more uniform heat distribution at the outlet. To reduce cost, the high-pressure turbine disk is manufactured by forging technique instead of powder metallurgy (PM) employed in the XF5; the material is a nickel-cobalt base superalloy, TMW-24, developed by NIMS, of which heat resistance is comparable to that of PM superalloys. Turbine blades made of a Japanese fifth generation nickel base single-crystal superalloy are friction welded to the disk to form the blisk, which is enclosed in the shroud made of ceramic matrix composites. The afterburner is a new type to eliminate the conventional annular flame holders to improve efficiency.

As another characteristic, the XF9-1 incorporates a starter generator that outputs 180 kW, meaning that a twin-engine fighter with this engine can be supplied with as much as 360 kW of electricity by engines alone. The capacity is quite large compared to that of conventional fourth or fifth generation fighters such as the Boeing F-15E (76 kW), the Lockheed Martin F-22 (130 kW), and the Lockheed Martin F-35 (160 kW), allowing for next generation avionics and other high power consuming onboard devices and equipment.

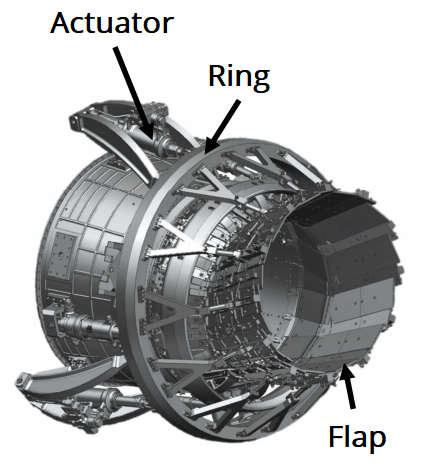
Thrust vectoring nozzle XVN3-1

In addition, research to demonstrate thrust vectoring control and its failure handling technology is conducted from 2016 to 2020 in parallel with development of the engine. This research is aimed at achieving higher maneuverability and smaller control surfaces favorable to stealth aircraft. For the XF9-1, the XVN3-1 three-dimensional thrust vectoring nozzle is available, which can deflect thrust up to 20 degrees in all circumference directions.

== Timeline ==
- 1995–2008
  - Research and development of the XF5 engine
- 2010
  - Research on main components of next-gen engines (–2015)
- 2013
  - Research on fighter engine elements (–2017)
- July 2017
  - Delivery of the core engine
- June 2018
  - Delivery of the prototype engine (XF9-1)

== Specifications ==
Data from

==== General characteristics ====
- Type: Afterburning turbofan
- Length: 4.8 m (16 ft)
- Diameter: <1 m (3 ft 3 in)
- Dry weight:

==== Components ====
- Compressor: 3-stage fan, 6-stage high-pressure compressor
- Combustors: Annular combustor
- Turbine: single-stage high-pressure turbine, single-stage low-pressure turbine

==== Performance ====
- Maximum thrust: > 107.9 kN (24,250 lbf) dry; > 147.10 kN (33,069 lbf) wet

== See also ==
- IHI XF5
- IHI F7
- IHI F3
- General Electric YF120
- Pratt & Whitney F119
- Pratt & Whitney F135
- i^{3} FIGHTER
- F-X (Japan)
