= IHI Corporation =

Manufacturing company in Japan

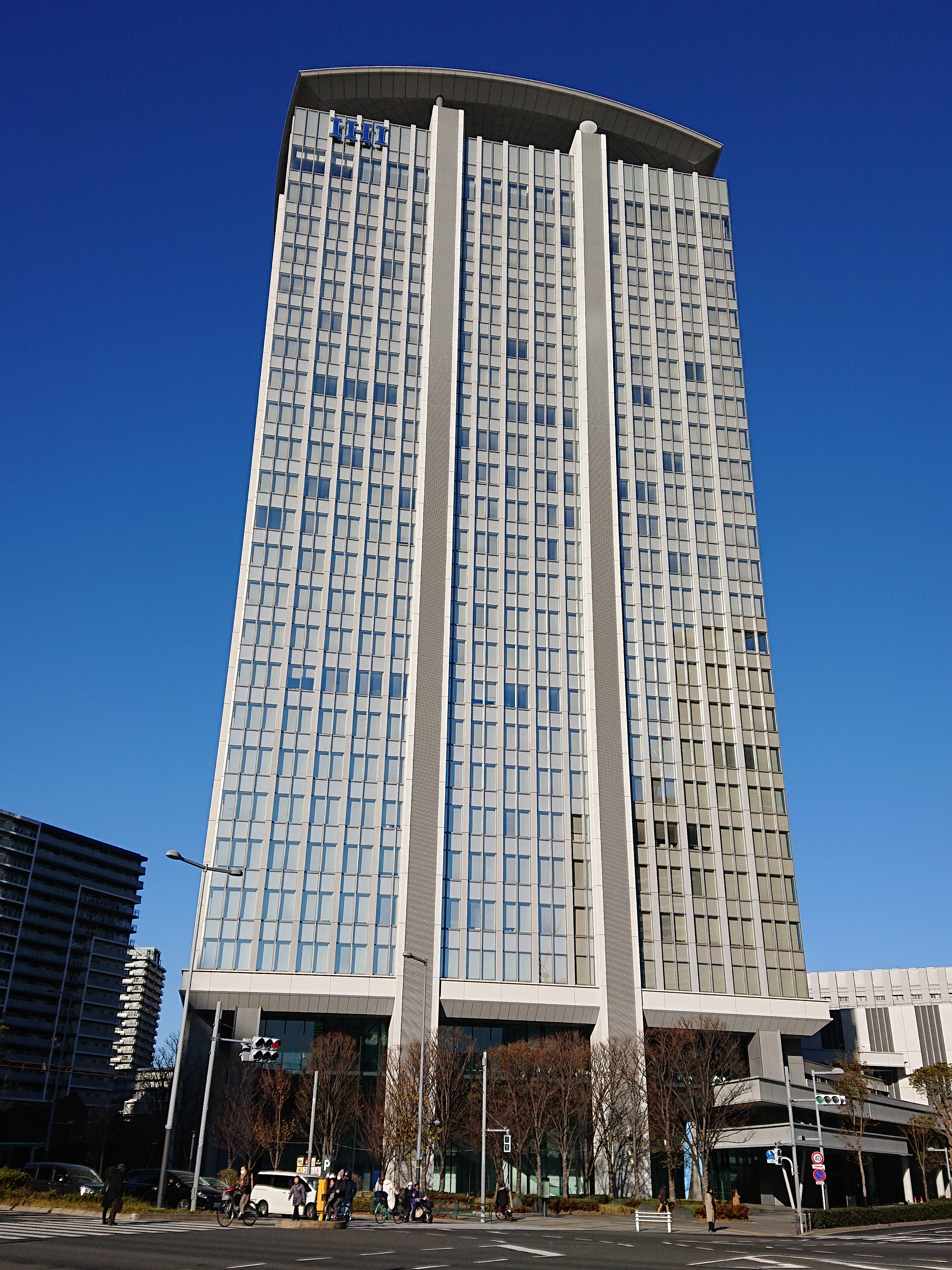
- Native name: 株式会社IHI
- Formerly: Ishikawajima-Harima Heavy Industries Co., Ltd (1960-2007)
- Type: Public KK
- Traded as: TYO: 7013
- Industry: Heavy equipment
- Predecessor: Ishikawajima Shipbuilding & Engineering Co., Ltd. Harima Dock Co., Ltd.
- Founded: 5 December 1853; 172 years ago
- Headquarters: Toyosu IHI Building, Tokyo, Japan
- Key people: Tsugio Mitsuoka (chairman); Hiroshi Ide (president and CEO)
- Products: Space development Jet engines Diesel engines Gas engines Industrial machinery Bridge & steel structures Energy systems etc
- Revenue: ▼¥1486.33 billion (2016)
- Operating income: ▲¥47.39 billion (2016)
- Net income: ▲¥5.25 billion (2016)
- Total assets: ▼¥1692.83 billion (2016)
- Total equity: ▲¥309.99 billion (2016)
- Owner: DKB Group
- Number of employees: 26,618 (2013)
- Parent: Dai-ichi Life (3.49%)
- Website: ihi.co.jp

IHI Corporation (株式会社IHI, Kabushiki-gaisha IHI), formerly known as Ishikawajima-Harima Heavy Industries Co., Ltd. (石川島播磨重工業株式会社, Ishikawajima Harima Jūkōgyō Kabushiki-gaisha) is a Japanese engineering corporation headquartered in Tokyo, Japan that produces and offers ships, space launch vehicles, aircraft engines, marine diesel engines, gas turbines, gas engines, railway systems, turbochargers for automobiles, plant engineering, industrial machinery, power station boilers and other facilities, suspension bridges and other structures.

IHI is listed on the Tokyo Stock Exchange Section 1. Following the reporting of a company whistleblower in February 2024, on April 24, 2024, the company announced that investigation was underway by the Ministry of Land, Infrastructure, Transport and Tourism of its subsidiary, IHI Power Systems Co., which had falsified its engine data since 2003, affecting over 4,000 engines worldwide.

== History ==
- 1853 – establishment of Ishikawajima Shipyard by the Mito Domain under order from the Edo Shogunate, who faced the Perry Expedition and the subsequent pressure to compete with the Great Powers, in Ishikawajima, Chuo district of Tokyo.
- 1854–1856 – construction of the Japanese warship Asahi Maru at Ishikawajima shipyard.
- 1889 – incorporation of Ishikawajima Shipyard as Ishikawajima Shipbuilding & Engineering Co., Ltd.
- 1907 – establishment of Harima Dock Co., Ltd.
- 1929 – spinoff of Harima's automobile section as Ishikawajima Automotive Works (later Isuzu through a series of mergers)
- 1960 – establishment of Ishikawajima-Harima Heavy Industries Co., Ltd. through a merger of Ishikawajima and Harima
- 1995 – IHI and Sumitomo Heavy Industries merged a warship business and established Marine United Ltd. The Uraga Dock Company was the origin in the shipbuilding of Sumitomo Heavy Industries. It was made by Enomoto Takeaki. However, Sumitomo Heavy Industries moved Uraga Dock to Yokosuka in 2003. IHI moved a shipbuilding section to Marine United in 2002 and changed its name to IHI Marine United Ltd. IHI Marine United became the subsidiary of IHI in 2006.
- 2000 – purchased Nissan's Aerospace and Defense Divisions and established IHI Aerospace Co., Ltd.
- 2007 – name changed to IHI Corporation.
- 2008 – Hauzer Techno Coating joins IHI Corporation as PVD coating machine manufacturer
- 2012 – IHI Corporation acquires Ionbond, provider of innovative coating services
- 2013 – established Japan Marine United Corporation, merging its ship building unit, Marine United Inc., with Universal Shipbuilding Corp. of JFE Holdings after discussion started in April 2008
- 2016 – sold all shares of wholly owned IHI Construction Machinery Limited to Kato Works Company Limited.
- 2018 – IHI halts manufacturing nuclear reactor parts to focus on aircraft parts, leaving Japan Steel Works as the sole Japanese supplier of reactor parts.
- 2024 – Subsequent to the February report of a company whistleblower; on April 24, IHI Corp. announced that its subsidiary, IHI Power Systems Co., had been falsifying fuel consumption and efficiency data of engines used in ships and trains since 2003, affecting 4,361 engines. Investigation by the Ministry of Land, Infrastructure, Transport and Tourism ensued.

== Businesses ==
=== Energy and resources ===
- Energy systems
- Process plants
- Energy storage

=== Gas turbines ===
- LM2500
- LM6000

=== Aircraft engines ===
IHI develops, manufactures, and maintains aero engines, either by joint projects of which partners include GE Aviation, Pratt & Whitney, and Rolls-Royce Holdings, or the company itself.

==== In-house development ====
- Ishikawajima Ne-20
- Ishikawajima-Harima J3
- Ishikawajima-Harima F3
- Ishikawajima-Harima XF5
- IHI Corporation F7, F7-10
- IHI Corporation XF9

==== Joint development ====
- IAE V2500
- General Electric GEnx
- General Electric GE90
- General Electric CF34
- Pratt & Whitney PW1100G-JM

==== Licensed production ====
- General Electric T700
- General Electric F110

==== Parts manufacturing ====
- Rolls-Royce Trent

=== Space products ===
- S-type Sounding Rocket (S-210, S-310, S-520, SS-520)
- M-V Launch Vehicle
- GX Launch Vehicle (Partner in Galaxy Express Corporation)
- Epsilon Launch Vehicle
- SRB-A solid rocket booster for H-IIA/H-IIB Launch Vehicle
- BT-4 liquid-fuelled apogee motor (used in the Cygnus vehicle which are launched on Atlas V and Antares rockets)

=== Ships ===
Shipbuilding was the founding activity of Ishikawajima in 1853. It remains part of IHI's business activities, although it has been diluted through several mergers with other Japanese shipbuilding companies.

In 1960, Ishikawajima Heavy Industries merged with Harima Shipbuilding & Engineering Company to establish the Ishikawajima-Harima Heavy Industries (IHI). IHI built Mutsu, Japan's first nuclear powered ship with reactors from Mitsubishi Heavy Industries in 1969. In 1995, Marine United was established jointly with Sumitomo Heavy Industries. In 2013, IHI Marine United was merged with Universal Shipbuilding Corporation owned by the steel company JFE Holdings in order to newly establish a larger firm, Japan Marine United Corporation (JMU), of which IHI remained a shareholder.

In March 2020, Japan Marine United (with 49% of shares) agreed to merge with Imabari Shipbuilding (with 51% of shares) into a joint venture named Nihon Shipyard (NSY), covering all ship types except Liquefied natural gas (LNG) tankers. This agreement became effective in January 2021. In parallel with the creation of Nihon Shipyard, Imabari Shipbuilding bought 30% of JMU's shares, while IHI and JFE Holdings each kept 35% of JMU's capital. The merger between these two Japanese companies resulted in Nihon Shipyard becoming one of the largest marine-engineering and shipbuilding companies in the world, of which IHI remains a shareholder.

==== IHI Marine United Tokyo shipyard ====
Ships built at Tokyo:

- Mutsu, Japan's first nuclear powered vessel
- Murasame (DD-101), Murasame-class destroyer
- Samidare (DD-106), Murasame class
- Akebono (DD-108), Murasame class
- Hiei (DDH-142), Haruna-class destroyer
- Tokiwa (AOE-423), Towada-class replenishment ship
- Asagiri (DD-151), Asagiri-class destroyer
- Amagiri (DD-154), Asagiri class
- Umigiri (DD-158), Asagiri class
- Sawayuki (DD-125), Hatsuyuki-class destroyer
- Isoyuki (DD-127), Hatsuyuki class
- Matsuyuki (DD-130), Hatsuyuki class
- Shirane (DDH-143), Shirane-class destroyer
- Kurama (DDH-144), Shirane class
- Chōkai (DDG-176), Kongō-class destroyer

==== IHI Marine United Yokohama shipyard ====
Ships built at Yokohama:

- Makinami (DD-112), Takanami-class destroyer
- Suzunami (DD-114), Takanami class
- Hyūga (DDH-181), Hyūga-class helicopter destroyer
- Ise (DDH-182), Hyūga class
- Izumo (DDH-183), Izumo-class helicopter destroyer
- Kaga (DDH-184), Izumo class
- Globtik Tokyo, Globtik Tokyo-class
- Globtik London, Globtik Tokyo-class
- Nissei Maru, Globtik Tokyo-class
- Tokyo Maru, Tokyo Maru-class

==== IHI Marine United Uraga shipyard ====
Ships built at Uraga:

- Takanami (DD-110), Takanami-class destroyer
- Yūdachi (DD-103), Murasame-class destroyer
- Tenryū (ATS-4203), a training support vessel
- Asuka (ASE-6102), a test ship

==== IHI Amtec shipyard ====
Ships built at Aioi:

- SSTH Ocean Arrow, a civilian ship

=== Steel structures ===
IHI Infrastructure Systems Co., Ltd., an IHI company, designs and constructs steel frame structures, bridges, and watergates.

==== Bridges ====
- Akashi-Kaikyo Bridge (Hyogo, Japan)
- Tatara Bridge (Hiroshima, Japan)
- Tokyo Bay Aqua-Line (Tokyo and Chiba, Japan)
- Second Bosporus Bridge (Istanbul, Turkey)
- Binh Bridge (Hanoi, Vietnam)
- Carquinez Bridge (California, U.S.A)
- Strait of Messina Bridge (Messina, Italy, Design phase completed)
- Osman Gazi Bridge (Turkey)
- Auckland Harbour Bridge lane clip-on expansions (New Zealand)
- Braila Bridge (Braila, Romania)
