= Fifth-generation fighter =

Classification of sophisticated jet fighter aircraft entering service since 2005

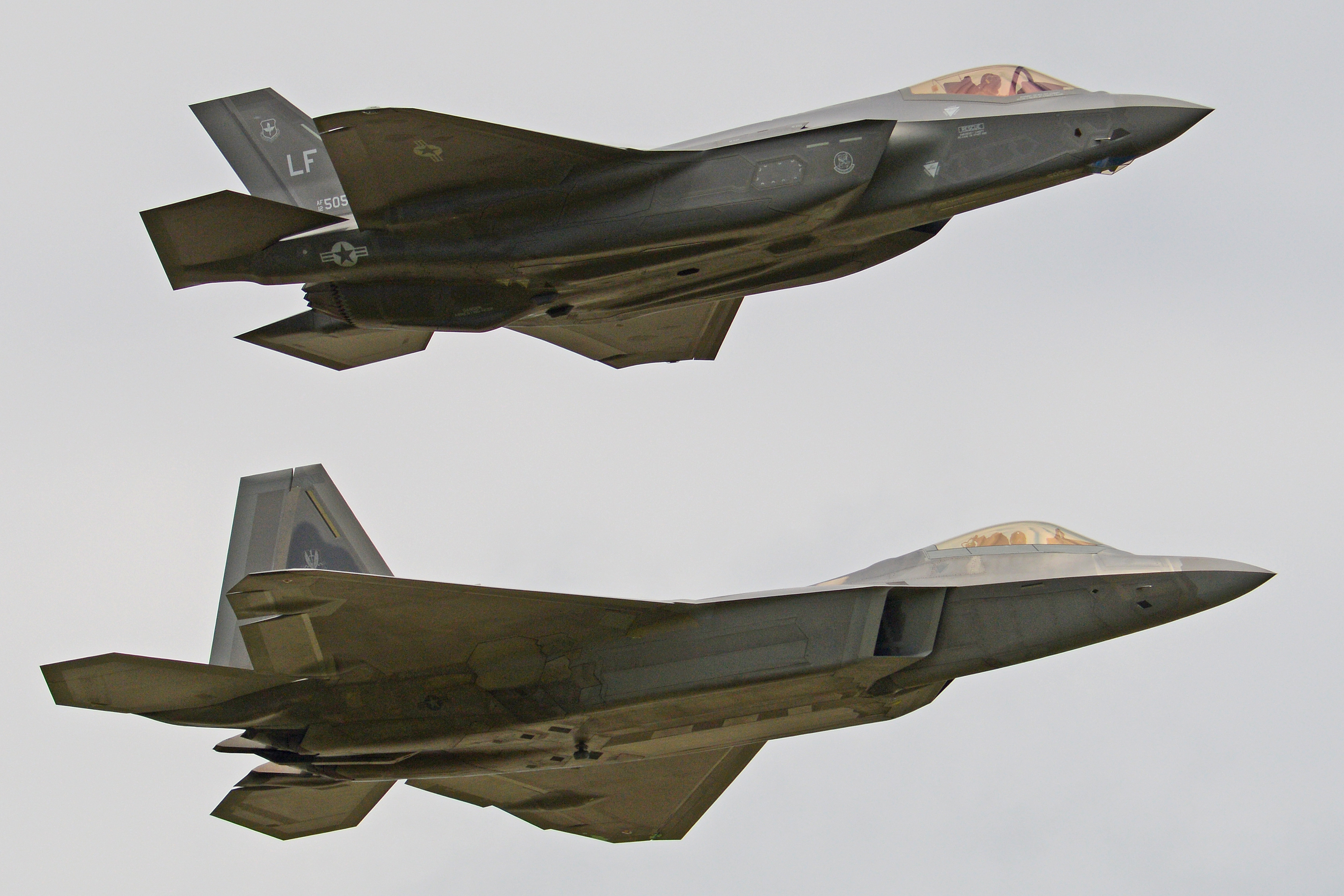
- A Lockheed Martin F-35 Lightning II (top) and Lockheed Martin F-22 Raptor (bottom), two fifth-generation fighters used by the United States Air Force

General information
- Type: Fighter aircraft
- National origin: Multi-national
- Status: In service

History
- First flight: 1990 (YF-23)
- Developed from: Fourth-generation fighter
- Developed into: Sixth-generation fighter

A fifth-generation fighter is a jet fighter aircraft classification which includes major technologies developed during the first part of the 21st century. As of 2026, these are the most advanced fighters in operation. The characteristics of a fifth-generation fighter are not universally agreed upon, and not every fifth-generation type necessarily has them all; however, they typically include stealth, low-probability-of-intercept radar (LPIR), agile airframes with supercruise performance, advanced avionics features, and highly integrated computer systems capable of networking with other elements within the battlespace for situational awareness and C^{3} (command, control and communications) capabilities.

As of December 2025, the combat-ready fifth-generation fighters are the Lockheed Martin F-22 Raptor, which entered service with the United States Air Force (USAF) in December 2005; the Lockheed Martin F-35 Lightning II, which entered service with the United States Marine Corps (USMC) in July 2015; the Chengdu J-20, which entered service with the People's Liberation Army Air Force (PLAAF) in March 2017; the Shenyang J-35, which entered service with the PLAAF and People's Liberation Army Navy Air Force (PLANAF) in September 2025; and the Sukhoi Su-57, which entered service with the Russian Air Force (VVS) in December 2020. Other national and international projects are in various stages of development.

== Characteristics ==
The emerging generation of advanced fighter aircraft in the first decades of the 21st century has come to be known as the fifth generation. The defining characteristics of such a fifth-generation fighter are not universally agreed upon, and not every fifth-generation type necessarily has them all. Some generation counts include more than five leading up to the emerging new generation.

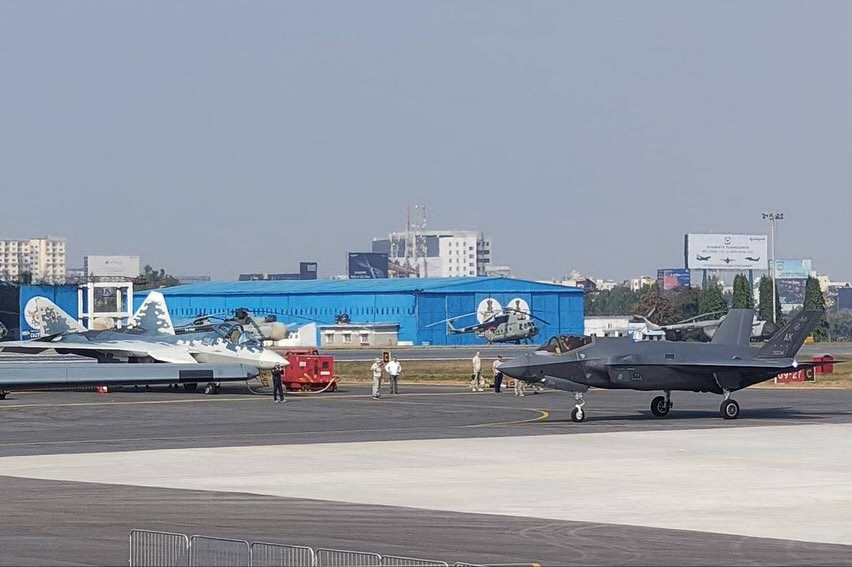
The Su-57 and F-35 at Aero India 2025.

Whereas previous fourth-generation fighters emphasized maneuverability and close-range dogfighting, typical fifth-generation characteristics include:

- Stealth, with munitions stored internally.
- High maneuverability, which tends to include short-field capabilities.
- Supercruise, i.e. prolonged supersonic cruise without the use of reheat.
- Advanced avionics, including low-probability-of-intercept radar (LPIR).
- Networked data fusion, enabling situation awareness on the battlefield.
- Multirole capabilities, such as battlefield C^{3} (command, control and communications).

In order to minimize their radar cross-section (RCS), most fifth-generation fighters use chines instead of standard leading edge extensions and lack canards, though the Sukhoi T-50 has engine intake extensions that seem to function somewhat like canards, and the Chengdu J-20 designers have chosen the agility enhancements of canards in spite of their poor stealth characteristics. They all have twin canted vertical tails (similar to a V-tail) also to minimize side RCS. Most fifth-generation fighters with supermaneuverability achieve it through thrust vectoring.

They all have internal weapon bays in order to avoid high RCS weapon pylons, but they all have external hardpoints on their wings for use on non-stealthy missions, such as the external fuel tanks the F-22 carries when deploying to a new theater.

All fifth-generation fighters have a high percentage of composite materials, in order to reduce RCS and weight.

=== Software-defined aircraft ===
All revealed fifth-generation fighters use commercial off-the-shelf main processors to directly control all sensors to form a consolidated view of the battlespace with both onboard and networked sensors, while previous-generation jet fighters used federated systems where each sensor or pod would present its own readings for the pilot to combine in their own mind a view of the battlespace. The F-22A was physically delivered without synthetic aperture radar (SAR) or situation awareness infra-red search and track. It will gain SAR later through software upgrades. However, any flaw in these complex software systems can disable supposedly unrelated aircraft systems, and the complexity of a software-defined aircraft can lead to a software crisis with additional costs and delays. By the end of 2013, the biggest concern with the F-35 program was software, especially the software required for data fusion across the many sensors.

Sukhoi calls their expert system for sensor fusion the artificial intelligence of the Su-57. Flight tests of their integrated modular avionics started in 2017 on a fiber optic networked multicore processor system. The system is not without faults. In December 2020, a malfunction with the computer flight control system caused the first production Su-57 to crash.

An automatic software response to an overheat condition apparently has contributed to a crash of an F-22. Issues with the avionics also contributed to an F-35A crash in 2020.

The F-35 uses software-defined radio systems, in which common middleware controls field-programmable gate arrays. Col. Arthur Tomassetti has said that the F-35 is a "software intensive airplane and software is easy to upgrade, as opposed to hardware".

In order to ease the addition of new software features, the F-35 has adopted a kernel and application separation of security responsibilities.

Steve O'Bryan of Lockheed Martin has said that the F-35 may gain the ability to operate UAVs through a future software upgrade. The USN is already planning to place its Unmanned Carrier-Launched Airborne Surveillance and Strike system under the control of a manned aircraft, to act as a flying missile magazine.

=== Situational awareness ===
The combination of stealthy airframes, stealthy sensors, and stealthy communications is designed to allow fifth-generation fighters to engage other aircraft before those targets are aware of their presence. Lt. Col. Gene McFalls of the USAF has said that sensor fusion will feed into inventory databases to precisely identify aircraft at a distance.

Sensor fusion and automatic target tracking are projected to give the fifth-generation jet fighter pilot a view of the battlespace superior to that of legacy AWACS (Airborne Warning and Control System) aircraft that may be forced back from the front lines by increasing threats. Therefore, tactical control could be shifted forwards to the pilots in the fighters. Michael Wynne, former Secretary of the United States Air Force, has suggested elimination of the Boeing E-3 Sentry and Northrop Grumman E-8 Joint STARS in favor of more F-35s, simply because so much effort is being made by the Russians and Chinese to target these platforms that are built to commercial airliner standards.

However, the more powerful sensors, such as AESA radar which is able to operate in multiple modes at the same time, may present too much information for the single pilot in the F-22, F-35 and Su-57 to adequately use. The Sukhoi/HAL FGFA offered a return to the two-seat configuration common in fourth generation strike fighters, but this was rejected over cost concerns.

There is ongoing research to apply track-before-detect across sensor fusion in the core CPU to allow fifth-generation fighters to engage targets that no single sensor has by itself detected. Probability theory is used to determine "what data to believe, when to believe and how much to believe".

These sensors produce too much data for the onboard computers to fully process so sensor fusion is achieved by comparing what is observed against preloaded threat libraries that contain known enemy capabilities for a given region. Items that do not match known threats are not even displayed.

=== Combat cloud ===
Gilmary M. Hostage III has suggested that fifth-generation jet fighters will operate together in a "combat cloud" along with future unmanned combat aircraft, and Michael Manazir has suggested that this might come as quickly as loading a UCLASS with AMRAAMs to be launched at the command of an F-35.

== History ==
Introduction timeline
2005	(United States) F-22A Raptor
2006
2007
2008
2009
2010
2011
2012
2013
2014
2015	(United States) F-35B Lightning II
2016	(United States) F-35A Lightning II
2017	(China) Chengdu J-20
2017	(United States) F-35I "Adir" Lightning II
2018
2019	(United States) F-35C Lightning II
2020	(Russia) Sukhoi Su-57
2021
2022
2023
2024
2025	(China) Chengdu J-20A
2025	(China) Chengdu J-20S
2025	(China) Shenyang J-35
2025	(China) Shenyang J-35A
TBA	(South Korea) KF-21EX
TBA	(Turkey) TAI TF-X Kaan
TBA	(Russia) Sukhoi Su-75 Checkmate
TBA	(India) HAL AMCA

=== United States ===
Before the introduction of stealth technology, bomb bays were mostly used by dedicated bomber aircraft; in fighters and attack airplanes bombs and rockets were hung from the wings or fuselage on pylons. Notable exceptions are the F-101, F-102 and F-106 interceptor aircraft, all of which had bays used to store missiles, or other weapons stores.

Prototypes and concept demonstrators built by American manufacturers included the Lockheed YF-22 – 1990 (2 built), Northrop YF-23 – 1990 (2 built) for the Advanced Tactical Fighter program, Boeing Bird of Prey – 1996 (1 built), McDonnell Douglas X-36 – 1997 (2 scale models built), the Lockheed Martin X-35 – 2000 (2 built) and Boeing X-32 – 2001 (2 built) for the Joint Strike Fighter program.

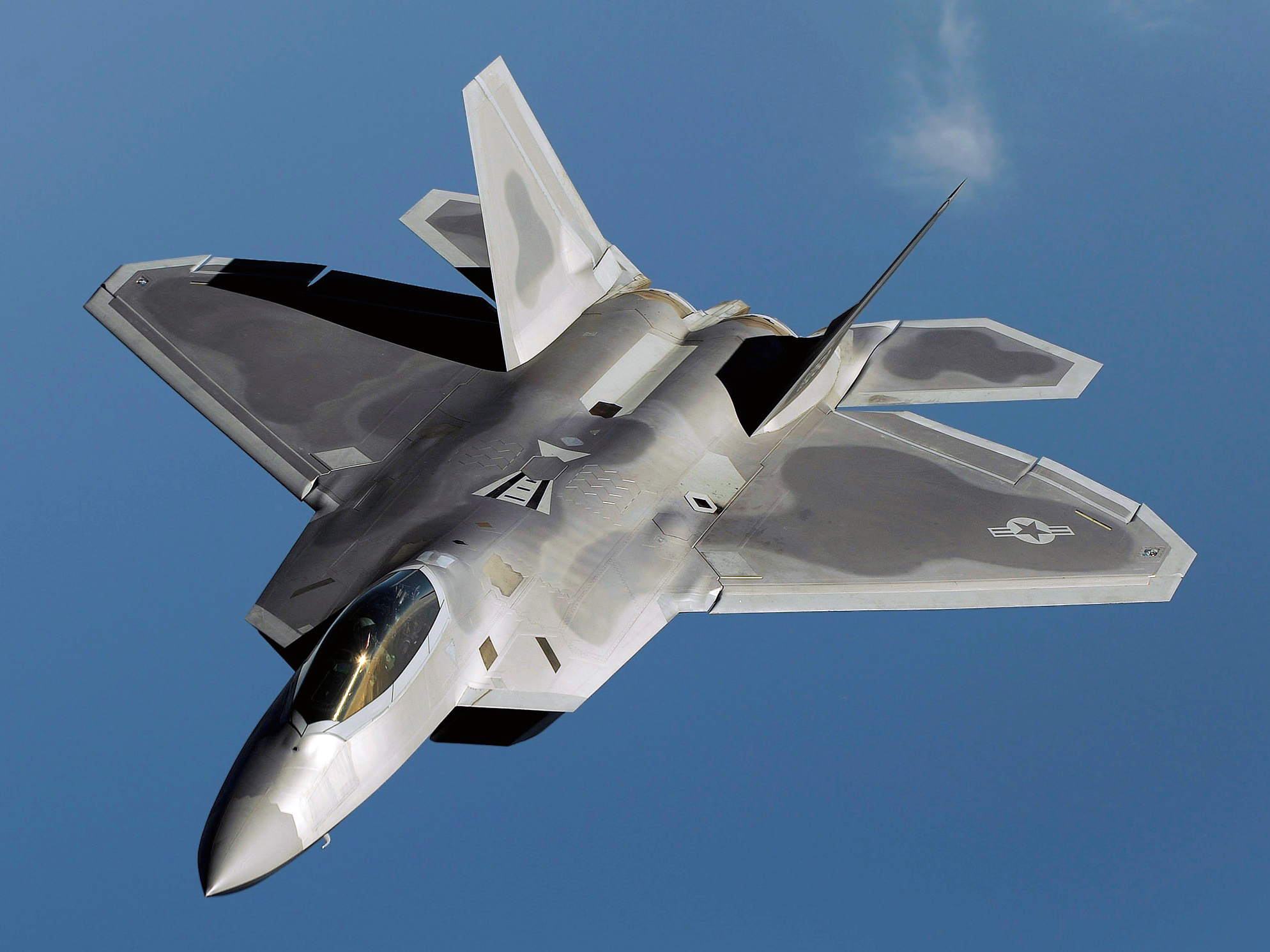
Lockheed Martin F-22 Raptor

Previous-generation radar low observable (LO) aircraft, also referred to as stealth aircraft, such as the Northrop Grumman B-2 Spirit bomber and Lockheed F-117 Nighthawk ground attack aircraft were not designed for air to air combat, lacking the active electronically scanned array (AESA) radars, low probability of intercept (LPI) data networks, aerial performance, and air-to-air weapons necessary to engage other aircraft. In the early 1970s, various American design projects identified stealth, speed, and maneuverability as key characteristics of a next-generation air-to-air combat aircraft. This led to the Request for Information for the Advanced Tactical Fighter project in May 1981, which resulted in the F-22.

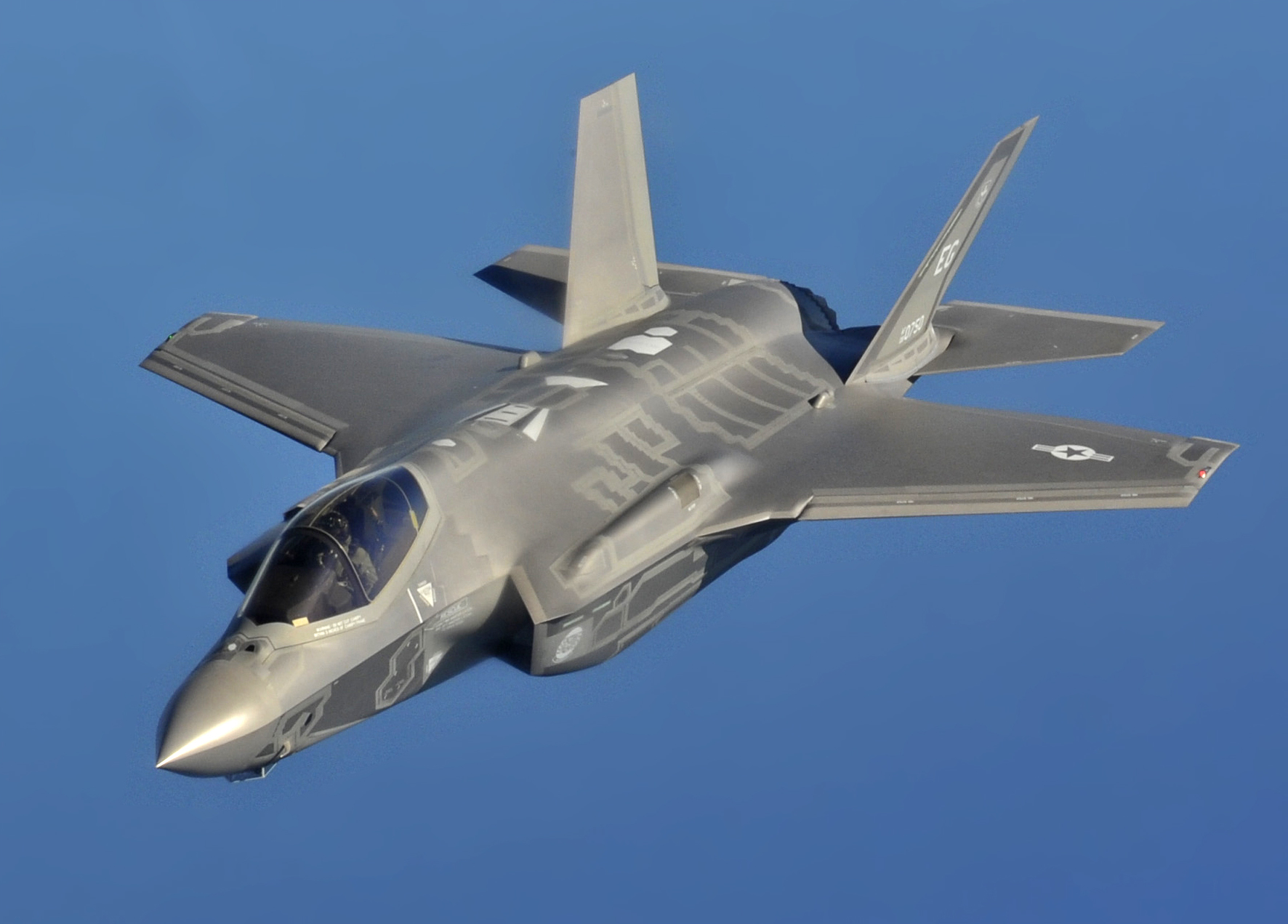
Lockheed Martin F-35A Lightning II

The USMC is leveraging the USAF's experience with "fifth-generation air warfare" in the F-22, as they develop their own tactics for the F-35.

According to Lockheed Martin in 2004, the only fifth-generation jet fighter then in operational service was their own F-22 Raptor. Lockheed Martin uses "fifth-generation fighter" to describe the F-22 and F-35 fighters, with the definition including "advanced stealth", "extreme performance", "information fusion" and "advanced sustainment". For unknown reasons, their definition no longer includes supercruise capability, which has typically been associated with the more advanced modern fighters, but which the F-35 lacks. Lockheed Martin attempted to trademark the term "5th generation fighters" in association with jet aircraft and structural parts thereof, and has a trademark for a logo with the term.

The definition of the term fifth-generation fighter from Lockheed Martin has been criticized by companies whose products do not conform to these particular specifications, such as Boeing and Eurofighter, and by other commentators such as Bill Sweetman: "it is misleading to portray the F-22 and F-35 as a linear evolution in fighter design. Rather, they are a closely related pair of outliers, relying on a higher level of stealth as a key element of survivability – as the Lockheed YF-12 and Mikoyan MiG-25, in the 1960s, relied on speed and altitude."

The United States Navy and Boeing have placed the Boeing F/A-18E/F Super Hornet in a "next generation" fighter category along with the F-22 and F-35, as the Super Hornet has a "fifth-generation" AESA radar, modest radar cross-section (RCS) reductions and sensor fusion. A senior USAF pilot has complained about fifth-generation claims for the Super Hornet: "The whole point to fifth generation is the synergy of stealth, fusion and complete situational awareness. The point about fifth-generation aircraft is that they can do their mission anywhere – even in sophisticated integrated air defense [IADS] environments. If you fly into heavy IADS with a great radar and sensor fusion, but no stealth, you will have complete situational awareness of the guy that kills you." Michael "Ponch" Garcia of Raytheon has said that the addition of their AESA radars to the Super Hornet provides "90 percent of your fifth-generation capability at half the cost." Additionally, a top Boeing official has called their newest 4.5 generation fighters "stealth killers".

=== China ===
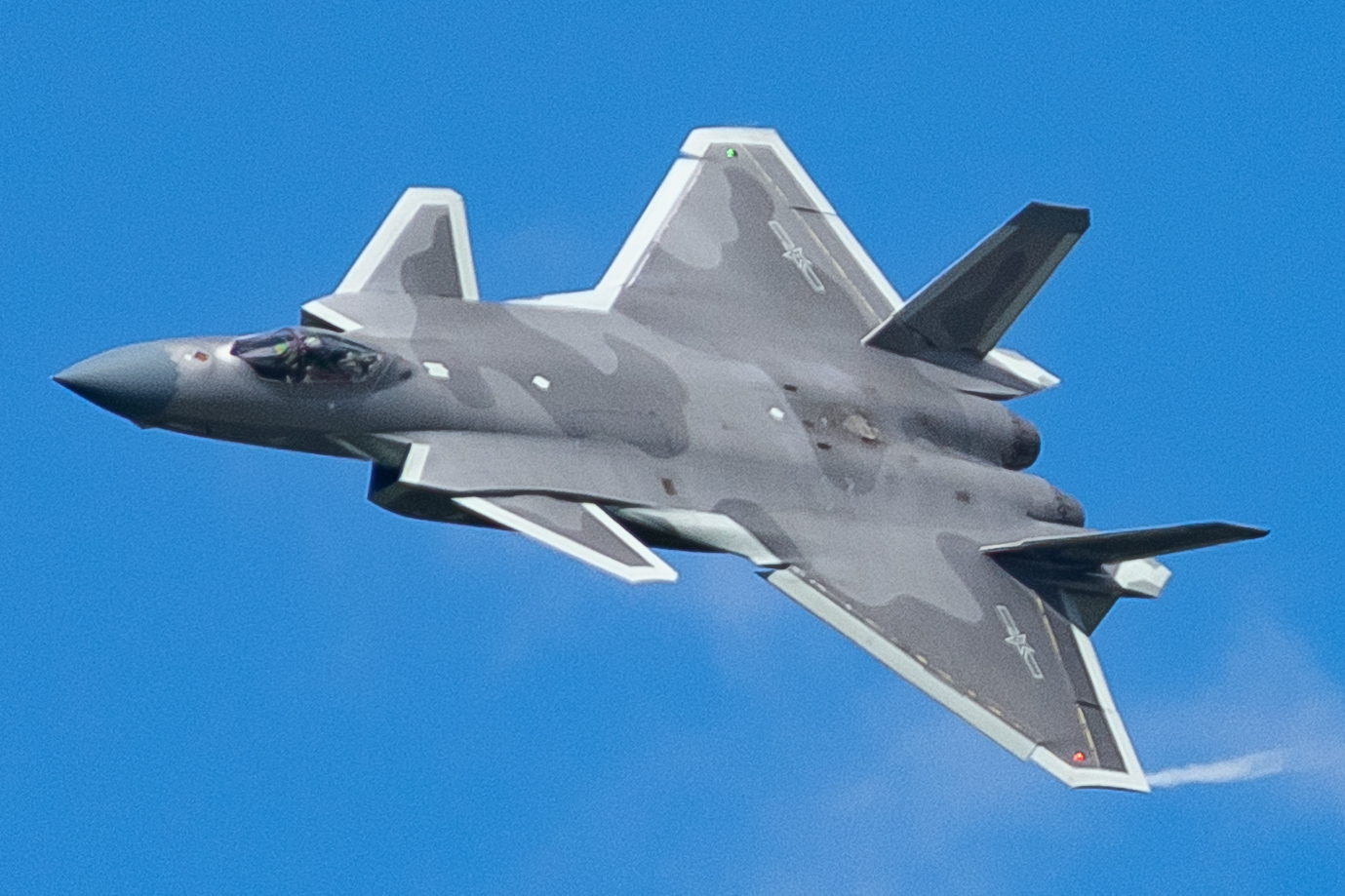
Chengdu J-20, introduced in 2017

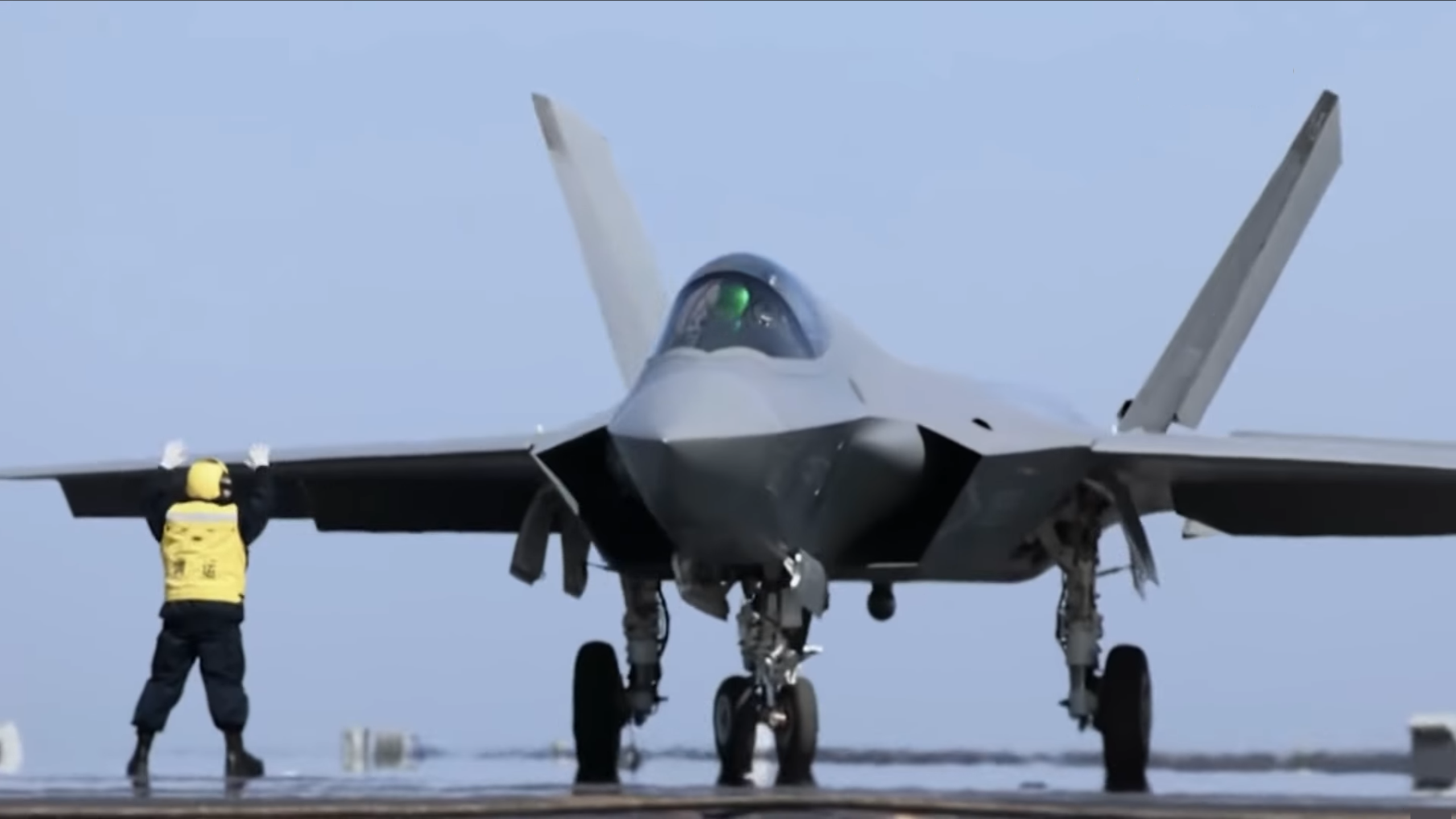
Shenyang J-35, introduced in 2025, on the deck of Chinese aircraft carrier Fujian

China has two stealth fighter aircraft, Chengdu J-20 and Shenyang J-35, both classified as fifth-generation fighter by United States Department of Defense and Defense Intelligence Agency.

By the late 1990s, several Chinese fifth-generation fighter programs, grouped under the program codename J-XX or XXJ, were identified by western intelligence sources. PLAAF officials have confirmed the existence of such a program, which they estimated would enter service between 2017 and 2019. By late 2010, two prototypes of the Chengdu J-20 had been constructed and were undergoing high-speed taxi trials. The J-20 made its first flight on 11 January 2011. On 26 December 2015, a new J-20 with serial number 2101 was seen leaving its Chengdu Aviation Corporation factory. It is believed to be the first of the low rate initial production (LRIP) aircraft. 2101 conducted its maiden flight on 18 January 2016.

The J-20 officially entered training unit service in March 2017, becoming the first operational stealth fighter outside of the United States and in Asia. The J-20 underwent testing and exercises in late 2017, and was inducted into PLAAF combat units in 2018.

Another stealth fighter design from SAC started to circulate on the internet in September 2011. In June 2012, photos about a possible prototype of F-60 being transferred on highway began to emerge on the internet. This aircraft was named Shenyang FC-31 later, and made its maiden flight on 31 October 2012. Serial production version of the FC-31 was dubbed as Shenyang J-35.

On 3 September 2025, China officially debuted Shenyang J-35A for the People's Liberation Army Air Force (PLAAF) and Shenyang J-35 for People's Liberation Army Navy (PLAN), while PLAAF also received the upgraded Chengdu J-20A and J-20S variants, as reported by Chinese state media China Daily.

=== Russia ===
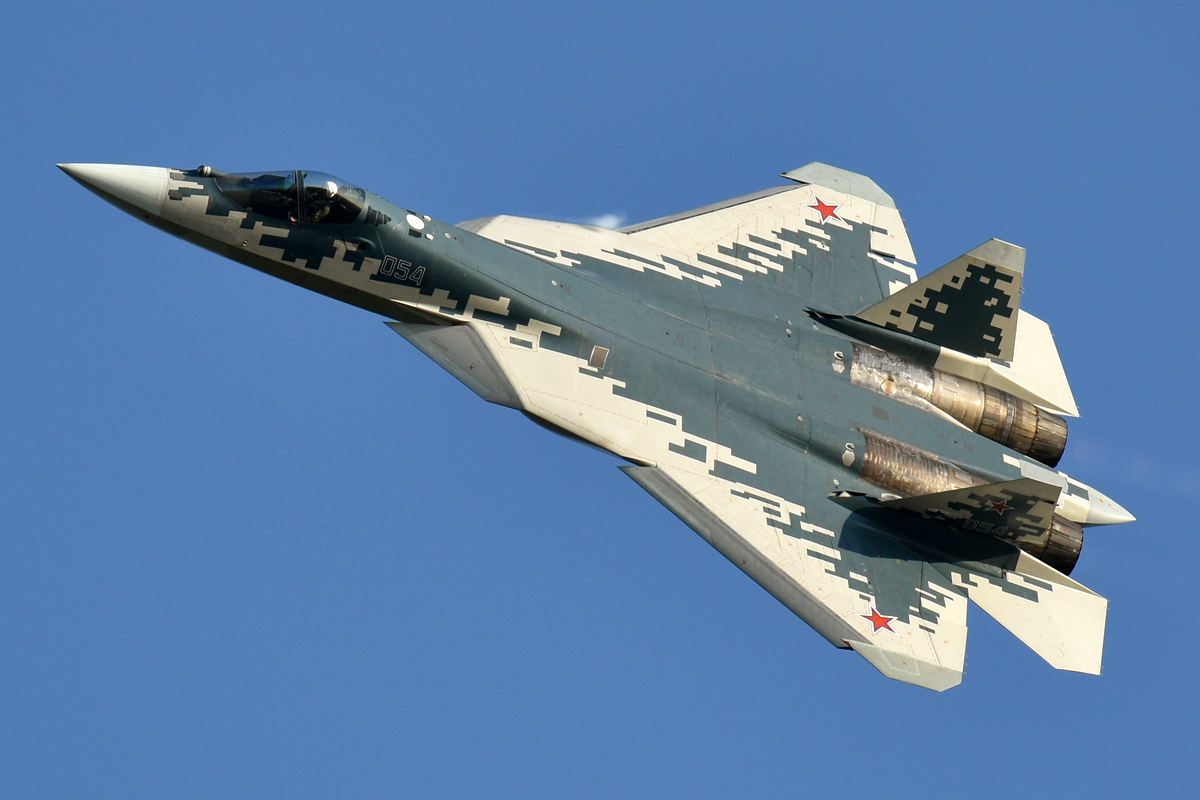
Sukhoi Su-57 prototype of the Russian Air Force

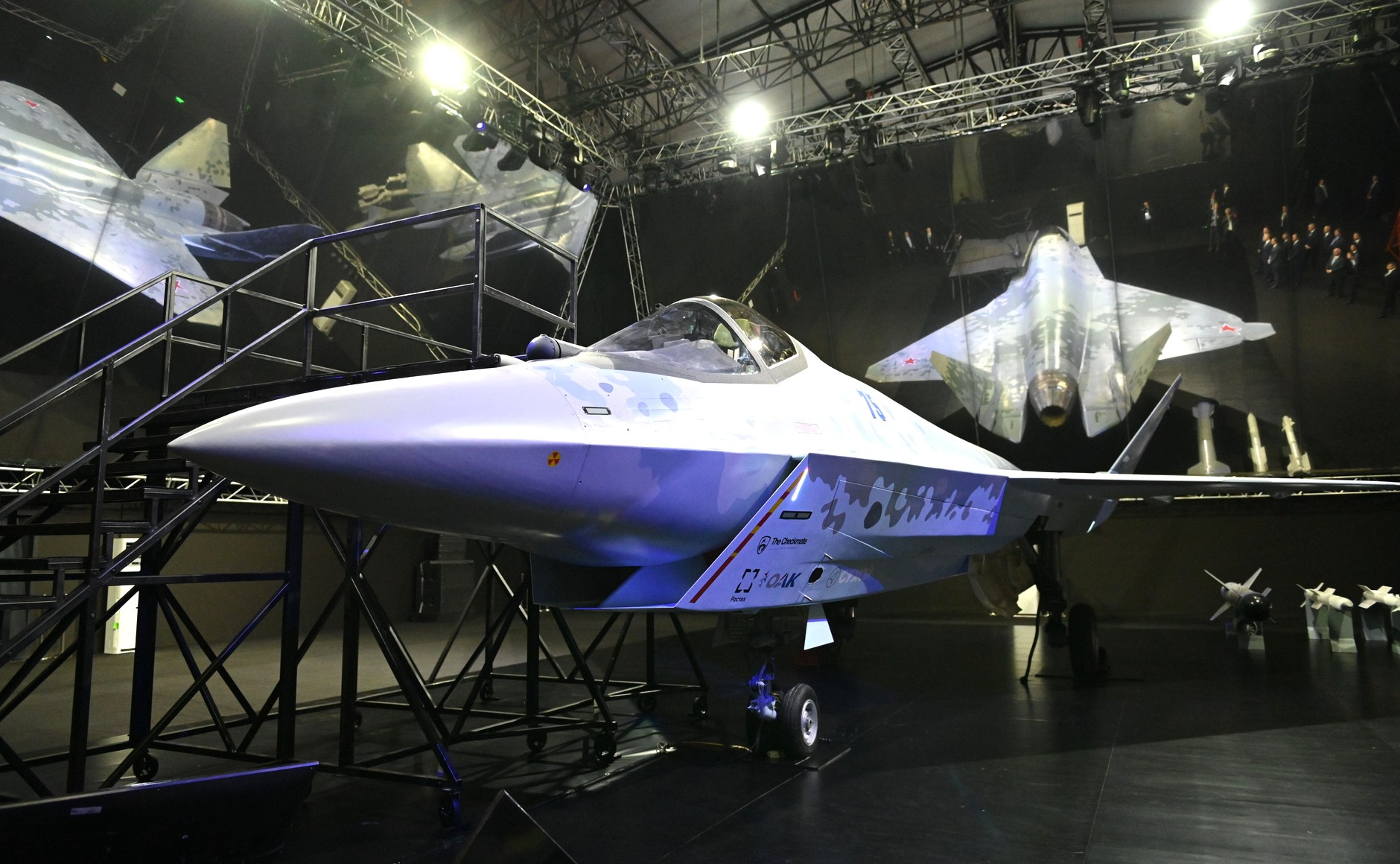
A static prototype of the Sukhoi Su-75 Checkmate at the MAKS Airshow 2021

Technology demonstrators included the Mikoyan Project 1.44 – 1998 (1 built) and Su-47 – 1997 (1 built).

In the late 1980s, the Soviet Union outlined the need for a next-generation aircraft to replace its fourth-generation jet fighters, the Mikoyan MiG-29 and Sukhoi Su-27, in front line service. To meet the characteristics for the next-generation aircraft, work was underway on two aircraft projects: the twin-engined delta canard Sukhoi Su-47 with forward-swept wings and the Mikoyan Project 1.44. However, due to the dissolution of the Soviet Union and lack of funds, both remained only as technology demonstrators.

After 2000, the Russian Defence Ministry initiated a new fighter competition known as "PAK FA" (Russian: ПАК ФА, short for: Перспективный авиационный комплекс фронтовой авиации, romanized: Perspektivny Aviatsionny Kompleks Frontovoy Aviatsii, lit. ''Prospective aeronautical complex of front-line air forces'') to develop a next-generation fighter for the Russian Air Force, with Sukhoi and MiG as the main competitors. Sukhoi came up with its heavier, two-engine T-50 proposal (now Sukhoi Su-57) while Mikoyan proposed a light, single-engine Mikoyan LMFS design, based on the former MiG-1.44 project. Sukhoi won the competition and in 2002, it was selected to lead the development of Russia's next-generation fighter based on the T-50 design. Later development of the multirole Mikoyan LMFS were continued from MiG funding. However Mikoyan LMFS program was also cancelled and replaced by similar Sukhoi Checkmate program.

Russia's first fifth-generation aircraft, the Sukhoi Su-57, will replace its aging MiG-29s and Su-27s. The Su-57 first flew on 29 January 2010. The first production Su-57 was delivered to the Russian Air Force on 25 December 2020.

The Mikoyan PAK DP is another proposed fifth-generation fighter, being developed to replace the MiG-31. The project began in 2010, and "According to Russian news reports, the MiG-41 will be equipped with stealth technology, reach a speed of Mach 4–4.3, carry anti-satellite missiles, and be able to perform tasks in Arctic and near-space environments."

Russia unveiled a prototype of the single-engine Sukhoi Su-75 Checkmate Light Tactical Aircraft in July 2021 at the biennial MAKS (air show), with maiden flight initially expected in 2023 (subsequently delayed to at least 2024). The fighter is mainly designed for export and is expected to be less costly than 2-engine competitors.

=== Turkey ===
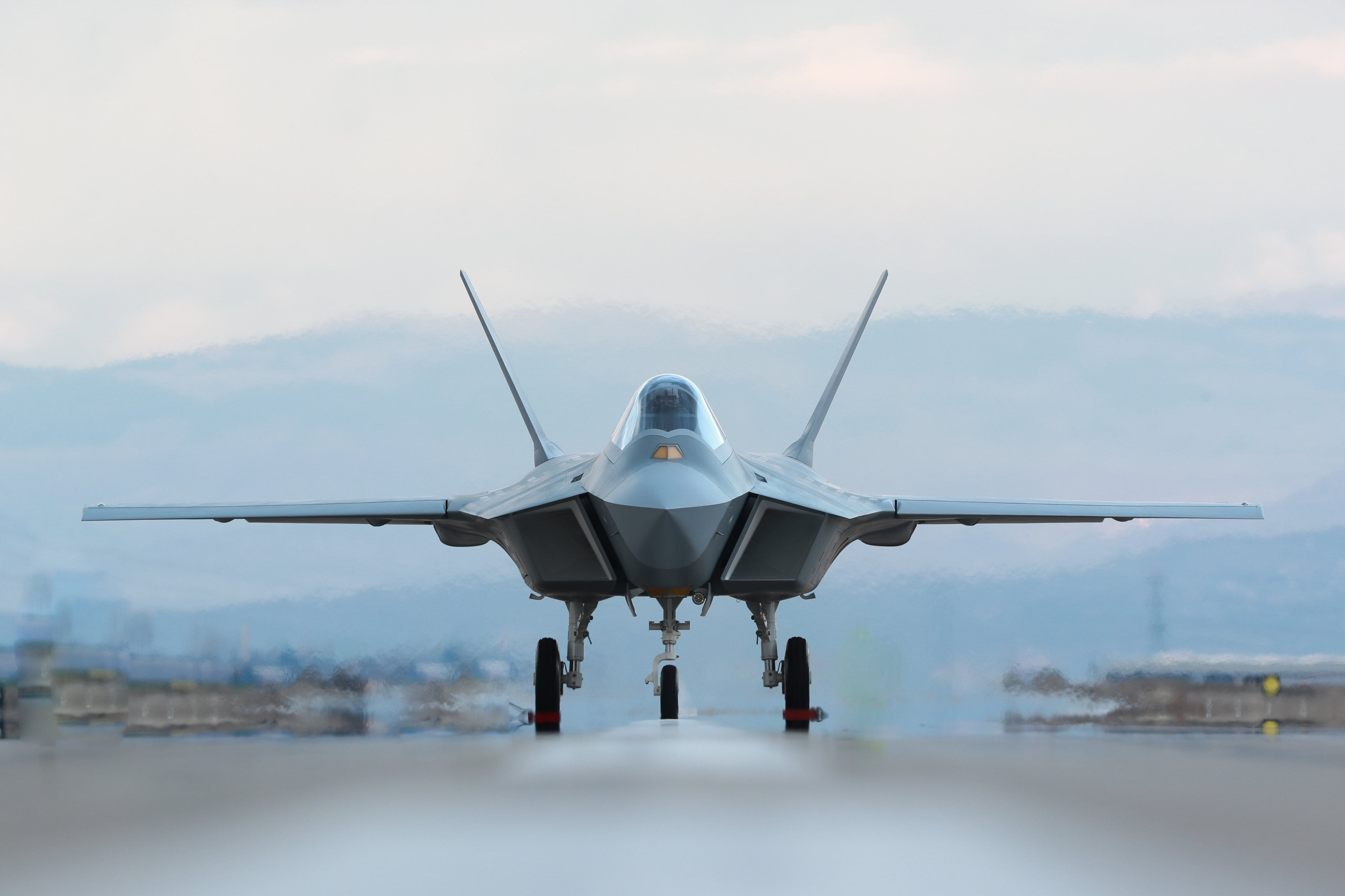
TAI TF-X Kaan prototype during the runway tests at TAI's facilities in Ankara, on March 17, 2023

The TAI TF-X Kaan, or in Turkish as Milli Muharip Uçak (MMU, National Combat Aircraft), is a stealth, twin-engine, all-weather, fifth generation air superiority fighter in development by Turkish Aerospace Industries (TAI) and BAE Systems as its sub-contractor. The TF-X is planned to replace the F-16 Fighting Falcon aircraft of the Turkish Air Force and to be exported to foreign states.

Taxiing and ground running tests of the prototype began two days before the scheduled roll-out, on March 16, 2023. It was officially given the name "Kaan" on May 1, 2023.

On 21 February 2024, the first Kaan prototype took its 13-minute maiden flight, taking off from Mürted Airfield Command in Ankara, Turkey. This prototype uses General Electric F110 engines, also used in the General Dynamics F-16 Fighting Falcon.

=== South Korea ===
In June 2024, KAI announced plans to add internal weapon bays to its 4.5 generation KF-21 Boramae, as part of its KF-21EX 5th generation enhancement programme.

=== India ===
India is independently developing a twin-engine fifth-generation supermaneuverable stealth multirole fighter, called the HAL Advanced Medium Combat Aircraft (AMCA). It is being developed and designed by the Aeronautical Development Agency and will be manufactured by a SPV with initial prototypes produced by Hindustan Aeronautics Limited. As of 2025, the AMCA prototype was under construction, with a first flight of the prototype expected by 2028.

In early 2018, India pulled out of the parallel project called FGFA, a fifth-generation derivative of the Sukhoi Su-57, which it alleged did not meet requirements for stealth, combat avionics, radars and sensors by that time. The completed FGFA was to include 43 improvements over the Su-57, including stealth, supercruise, advanced sensors, networking and combat avionics.

=== Sweden ===
Saab's Flygsystem 2020 is a program to develop a fifth generation fighter.

=== Japan ===
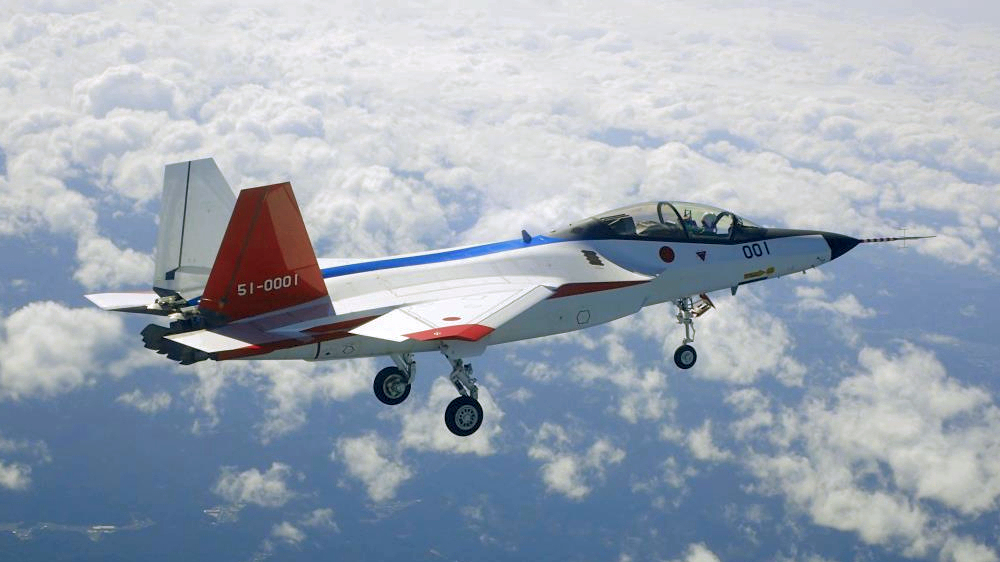
Mitsubishi X-2 Shinshin demonstrator

Japan developed a prototype of a stealth jet fighter called the Mitsubishi X-2 Shinshin, previously referred to as the ATD-X. At the beginning of the twenty-first century, Japan, seeking to replace its aging fleet of fighter aircraft, began making overtures to the United States on the topic of purchasing F-22 fighters for their own forces. However the U.S. Congress had banned the exporting of the aircraft in order to safeguard secrets of the aircraft's technology such as its extensive use of stealth; this rejection necessitated Japan's development of its own modern fighter, to be equipped with stealth features and other advanced systems.

A mock-up of the X-2 Shinshin was constructed and used to study the radar cross section in France in 2009. The first prototype rolled out in July 2014 and the aircraft made its first flight on 22 April 2016. By July 2018, Japan had gleaned sufficient information, and decided that it would need to bring on international partners to complete this project. Several companies have responded.

Japan has signed a contract with Mitsubishi Heavy Industries to develop a sixth-generation fighter called Mitsubishi F-X.

== Comparison of 5th-generation fighters in service ==
	F-22	F-35A	F-35B	F-35C	Su-57	J-20	J-35	J-35A
Country	USA	USA	USA	USA	Russia	China	China	China
Maiden flight	1997	2006	2008	2010	2010	2011	2021	2023
Entered service	2005	2016	2015	2019	2020	2017	2025	2025
Number built	195 (Note: 9 EMD and 186 production aircraft)	354+ (Note: While Lockhead Martin has produced more than 1310 F-35's, the announced number of each variant produced has not been updated.)	108+	38+	42 (Note: 32 production aircraft and 10 test aircraft)	500	57	
Length, meters	18.92 m (62 ft 1 in)	15.67 m (51 ft 5 in)	15.61 m (51 ft 3 in)	15.67 m (51 ft 5 in)	20.1 m (65 ft 11 in)	21.2 m (69 ft 7 in)	17.3 m (56 ft 9 in)	17.3 m (56 ft 9 in)
Wingspan	13.56 m (44 ft 6 in)	10.7 m (35 ft 1 in)	10.7 m (35 ft 1 in)	13.1 m (43 ft 0 in)	14.1 m (46 ft 3 in)	13.01 m (42 ft 8 in)	11.5 m (37 ft 9 in)	
Wing Area, sq. meters	78.04	42.7	42.7	62.1	78.8	73		
Empty Weight, kg	19,700	13,300	14,700	15,800	18,500	17,000		
Loaded Weight, kg	29,410	22,470	21,770	25,900	29,270	25,000		
Max Weight, kg	38,000	31,800	27,300	31,800	35,000	37,000		
Thrust vectoring	2D	none	STOVL	none	3D	none/3D	none	none
Takeoff-Landing	CTOL	CTOL	STOVL	CATOBAR	CTOL	CTOL	CATOBAR	CTOL
Max speed, Mach	2.25	1.6	1.6	1.6	2.0	2.0	1.8	1.8
Cruise speed, Mach	1.76				1.3			
Ferry range, km	3,220	2,220	1,670	2,520	3,500	5,500		
Ceiling	20,000 m (66,000 ft)	15,000 m (49,000 ft)	15,000 m (49,000 ft)	15,000 m (49,000 ft)	20,000 m (66,000 ft)	20,000 m (66,000 ft)	16,000 m (52,000 ft)	16,000 m (52,000 ft)
Engines	2	1	1	1	2	2	2	2
Dry thrust, kN	232	125	125	125	176.6	172 (Note: Shenyang WS-10C)		
Afterburn. Thrust, kN	312	191	191	191	294.2	294		
Thrust/weight ratio	1.08	0.87	0.9	0.75	1.02	1		
Gun(s)	20mm	25mm	None	None	30mm	None		
Int/Ext hardpoints	8/4	6/6	4/6	6/6	6/6	8/4	6/6	6/6
Radar	XBand	XBand	XBand	XBand	X + LBand	XBand	XBand	XBand
Radar range target	240 km	150 km	150 km	150 km	Unknown	Unknown		

== See also ==
- Air superiority fighter
- Stealth aircraft
