= Sixth-generation fighter =

Classification of post-2020s jet fighters

Sixth-generation jet fighter
- The Chengdu J-36, the world's first publicly flown 6th-generation fighter.

General information
- Type: Fighter aircraft
- Status: In development

History
- Developed from: Fifth-generation fighter

A sixth-generation fighter is a jet-powered fighter aircraft more advanced than the fifth-generation jet fighters currently in service and development. Key characteristics include advanced stealth technology, increased range, beyond-visual-range weapons, and potentially aerial manned-unmanned teaming.

As of 2026, various national and multinational programs are in progress, with the first sixth-generation fighters expected to enter service in the 2030s. China is the first nation to publicly fly prototypes widely referred to as sixth-generation fighter aircraft. China has test-flown two sixth-generation prototypes, tentatively named the Chengdu J-36 and Shenyang J-50, in 2024.

In 2025, the United States Air Force picked the Boeing F-47 design for its Next Generation Air Dominance program, started in 2014 to replace the F-22 Raptor. The United States Navy is pursuing the F/A-XX program to replace its F/A-18E/F Super Hornets. Boeing was also awarded the development contract for the Boeing F/A-XX in September 2026.

In 2022, the Italy-Japan-UK Global Combat Air Programme was launched to replace their Eurofighter Typhoon and Mitsubishi F-2 fleets.

== Characteristics ==
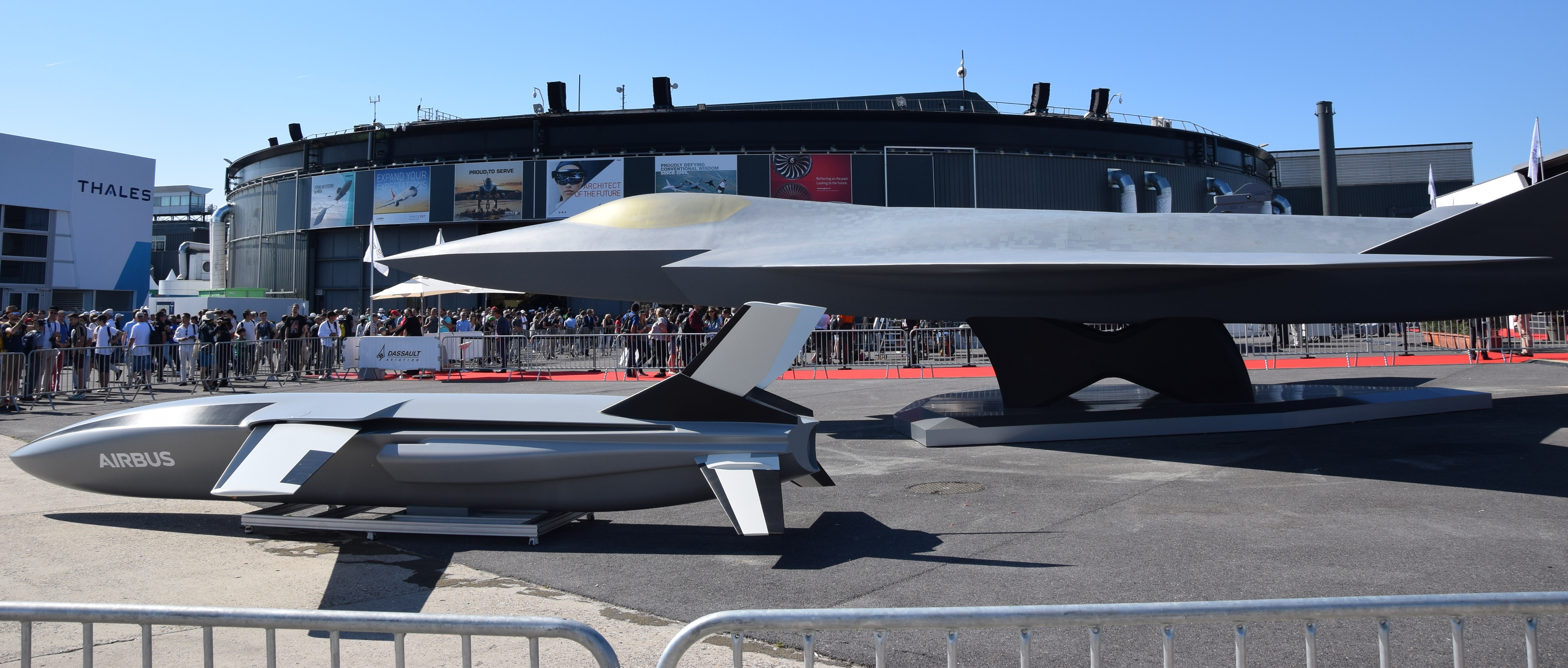
Mock-up of a sixth-generation fighter aircraft and a loyal wingman drone concept at the 2019 Paris Air Show

Sixth-generation fighter concepts generally share some assumptions. One is that the fifth-generation capability for air-to-air combat, battlefield survivability in the anticipated anti-access/area denial environment and ground support/attack will need to be enhanced and adapted to the future threat environment. Another is that sixth-gen planes will do less close-in dogfighting, but beyond-visual-range (BVR) air-to-air missiles will remain important. Others include the need to handle ground support, cyber warfare and even space warfare missions; and the need to be able to direct or fight with more numerous fleets of satellite drones and ground sensors in a high-traffic networked environment, allowing for greater insights through data-informed decision-making.

These and other assumptions suggest these design characteristics:

- Designed using digital engineering (aka model-based design).
- Advanced digital capabilities including high-capacity networking, artificial intelligence, data fusion, cyber warfare, data-to-decision and battlefield command, control and communications (C3) capabilities.
- Designed to control loyal wingman drones.
- Use of gallium nitride in power transistors.
- Optionally manned, with the same airframe capable of conducting piloted, remote controlled or onboard-AI controlled missions.
- Enhanced human-systems integration, with virtual cockpits presented via helmet-mounted displays which allow the pilot 360-degree vision with AI-enhanced battlefield awareness, and replacing conventional instrument panels.
- Advanced stealth airframes and avionics.
- Advanced variable-cycle engines able to cruise economically but still deliver high thrust when required.
- Increased-range stand-off and beyond-visual-range weapons.
- Potential use of directed-energy weapons such as a laser close-in weapon system (CIWS).
- Software architecture with separation of flight critical operations from other functionality.

The feasibility of some of these characteristics remains uncertain. Development time and cost are likely to prove major factors in laying out practical roadmaps. Specific requirements are anticipated by some observers to crystallize around 2025.

== History of countries with active programs ==
=== China ===
After successfully developing the 5th-generation J-20 stealth fighter, China began working on the development of next-generation aircraft. In January 2019, Wang Haifeng, chief designer of the Chengdu Aircraft Corporation (CAC) announced that China had begun pre-research on sixth-generation aircraft, predicting that aircraft from the programme would enter service by 2035.

In 2018, Chengdu Aerospace Corporation reportedly submitted eight proposals for the sixth-generation fighter design, and four designs were tested in low-altitude wind tunnels. In the same year, Shenyang Aircraft Corporation (SAC) also reportedly developed prototypes for the next-generation aircraft.

In October 2021, a fighter aircraft with a tailless design was spotted in Chengdu Aircraft Corporation facilities.

In September 2022, United States Air Force (USAF) General Mark D. Kelly, head of the Air Combat Command (ACC) said China was on track for its sixth-generation fighter program, and that it looked at sixth-generation technology in the same way USAF did in terms of using a ‘system of systems’ approach while offering “exponential” improvements in stealth, processing power, and sensing. He added that China saw that the technology allowed for iteration based on open mission systems and that the country's ability to master the advanced levels of stealth required for sixth-generation platforms was part of that iterative approach.

In February 2023, Aviation Industry Corporation of China (AVIC) shared its six-generation fighter aircraft concept on social media. The featured concept included diamond-shaped wings and tailless design, which correlated with earlier images released in various AVIC presentations.

In November 2024, AVIC released footage of a mockup of the Baidi B-Type (White Emperor) “integrated space-air fighter”. Some commentaries believed the mock-up indicated six-generation fighter capabilities, while critics stated claims of space operations capability lack evidence and were "dubious". The mock-up was later proved to be a marketing plan for an AVIC-sponsored science fiction novel.

On 26 December 2024, social media photos and videos suggested Chengdu Aircraft Corporation (CAC) has publicly flown a prototype aircraft in Chengdu, Sichuan. The aircraft was spotted flying around an airport owned by CAC and features a trijet tailless flying wing design. Tentatively designated Chengdu J-36 by defense analysts, it was trailed by a Chengdu J-20S twin-seater stealth fighter as the chase plane. The aircraft was believed to have advanced stealth and sensor features, while its capabilities, roles, and design details remained speculative.

Observers believe that CAC chose 26 December to carry out the flight in commemoration of Mao Zedong's birthday on that day. On the same day, further social media posts indicated a second airframe, featuring a cranked arrow configuration with sharply swept wings, was spotted near Shenyang Aircraft Corporation's facilities. Unconfirmed reports suggested the Shenyang fighter made its maiden flight on 20 December 2024.

The Shenyang aircraft prototype seemed to be smaller than the Chengdu one. It was trailed by a Shenyang J-16 strike fighter as the chase plane. The aircraft was tentatively named Shenyang J-50 or Shenyang J-XD by analysts for identification, but further information was limited.

On 5 August 2025, a third tailless stealth aircraft prototype was spotted in China, with a distinct silhouette different from the previous J-36 and J-50. The photo on social media displayed an aircraft with pointed nose, highly swept wings with cropped tips, and W-shaped trailing edge featuring a central extension in triangular shape. Defense analysts speculated the airframe was an early prototype of China's sixth generation "loyal wingman" drone or an crewed aircraft competing with J-36 and J-50. South China Morning Post reported that the aircraft design is a carrier-based fighter, and its design can be traced to a research paper published by the Northwestern Polytechnical University.

=== Italy, Japan, UK ===
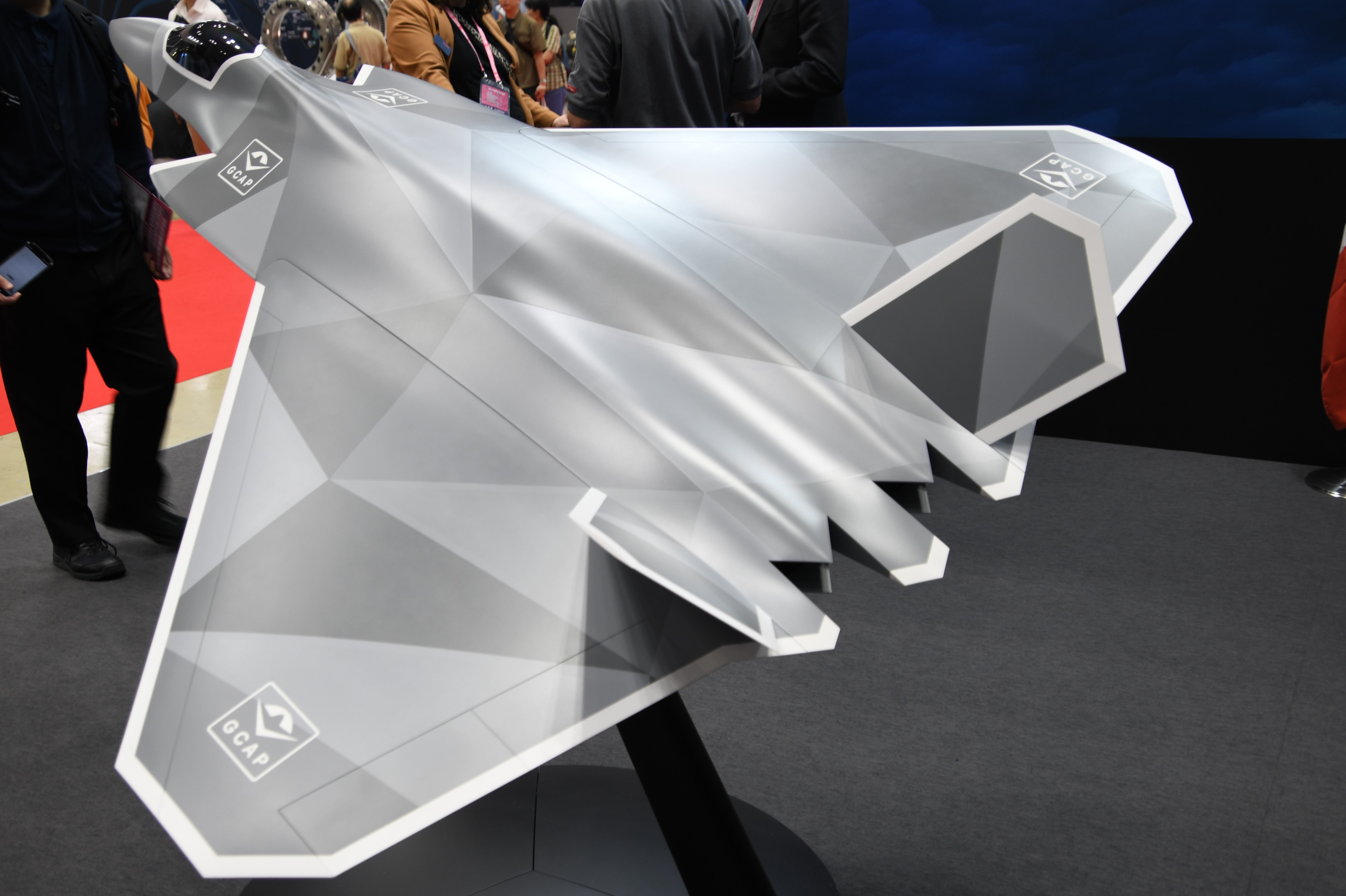
GCAP concept model (delta wing type) left rear top view in GCAP booth of JA2024 at Tokyo Big Site 2024

In 2010, the Japanese government revealed the concept sixth-generation jet fighter, the i3 FIGHTER. i3 is short for informed, intelligent and instantaneous.

In July 2014, Jane's Information Group reported that a House of Commons Defence Select Committee had published a report about the UK's "post-2030 combat aviation force structure". The report highlighted a possibility of the UK committing to a next generation fighter program to potentially replace the Eurofighter Typhoon post-2030; the Eurofighter Typhoon has since had its intended service life extended to around 2040. On 22 March 2016, Japan conducted the first flight of the Mitsubishi X-2 Shinshin testbed aircraft for this project.

In July 2018, Gavin Williamson, then Secretary of State for Defence of the United Kingdom, unveiled the United Kingdom's Combat Air Strategy and announced the development of a sixth-generation fighter concept named the Tempest for the Royal Air Force at the 2018 Farnborough Airshow.

In 2019, Sweden and Italy joined the Tempest project. During the same year, India and Japan were also invited to join the project. On 1 April 2020, the Japanese F-X program was announced. In 2022, after a year of ever closer collaboration with the Tempest project and a retreat from an industrial partnership with Lockheed Martin, Japan merged its F-X project with the BAE Tempest fighter development to form the three nation Global Combat Air Programme while opting to pursue separate drone development. Two weeks after the agreement was signed between the UK, Italy & Japan; Sweden signed a bi-lateral defence trade agreement with Japan allowing them to continue on as an observer in the programme and the option to participate as a development partner in the future if desired.

=== United States ===
==== Timeline ====
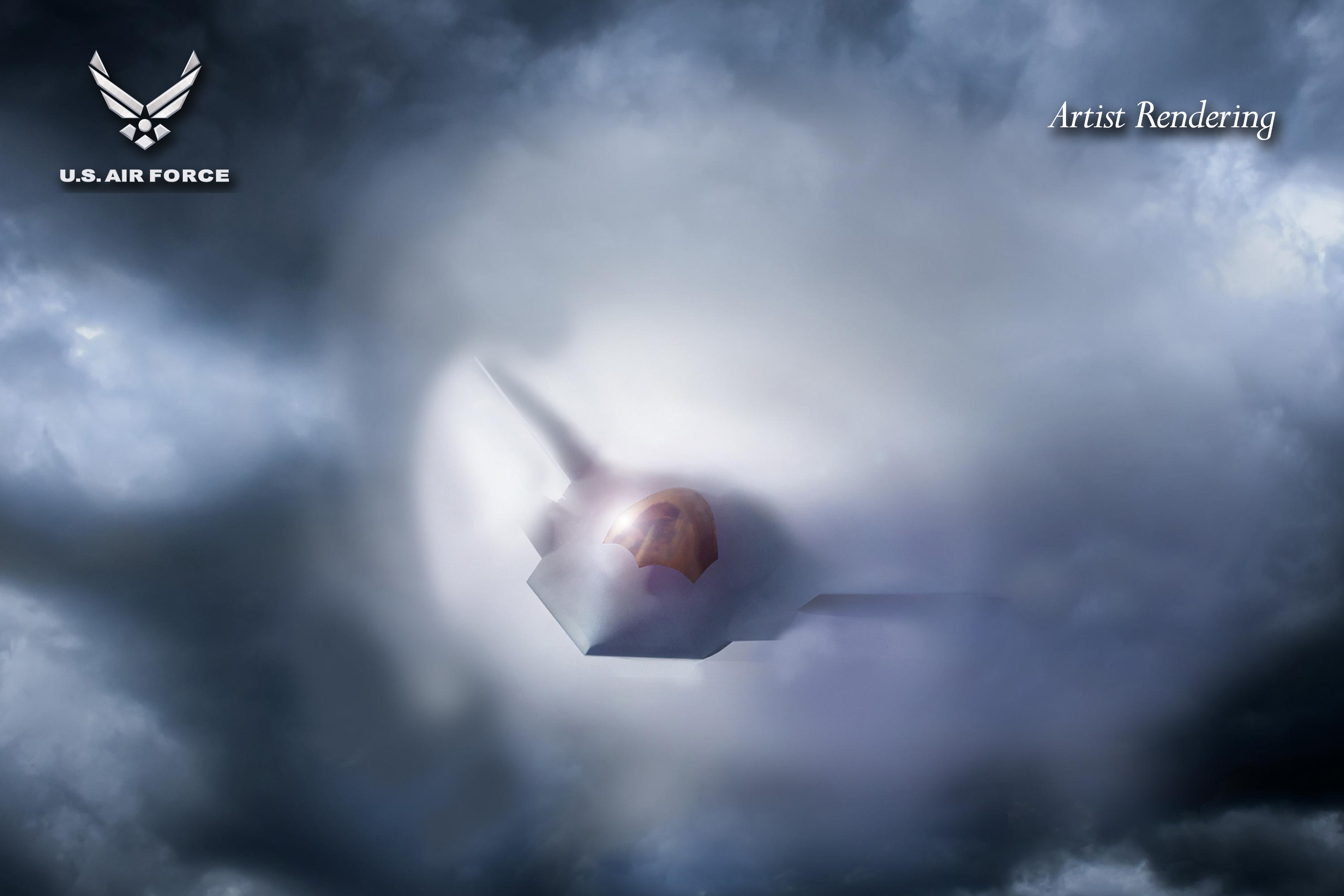
An artist's rendering of the F-47 NGAD fighter aircraft in flight.

The United States Air Force (USAF) and United States Navy (USN) are expected to field their first sixth-generation fighters in the 2030s. The USAF's Next Generation Air Dominance (NGAD) program aims to develop the F-47, a sixth-generation air superiority fighter to succeed the Lockheed Martin F-22 Raptor. Since 2008, the USN's similar program of the same name has been working toward an F/A-XX fighter to complement the smaller Lockheed Martin F-35C Lightning II and replace the Boeing F/A-18E/F Super Hornet.

In 2010, the USAF sought initial responses for a Next Generation Tactical Aircraft (Next Gen TACAIR), which would become the F-X program.

In April 2013, DARPA began looking at a plan to merge the USAF and USN concepts, develop prototype X-planes under the "Air Dominance Initiative", and lay the groundwork for a single plane with Navy and Air Force variants. But that same year, the RAND Corporation recommended that the services avoid a joint fighter effort, noting that in previous complex joint projects, design compromises had raised costs far more than normal single-service programs.

In 2014, a broader approach to offensive technologies was proposed, with USAF aircraft anticipated to operate alongside ground-based and non-kinetic anti-aircraft solutions, and with a greater weapon load than current fighters. In 2016, the USAF consolidated this change of course for its Air Superiority 2030 plan, to pursue "a network of integrated systems disaggregated across multiple platforms" rather than focusing on the sixth-generation fighter. The Air Force and Navy requirements had already been merged the year before and were now formally integrated, with the joint focus to be on AI systems and a common airframe.

Boeing, Lockheed Martin and Northrop Grumman have all announced sixth-generation aircraft development projects. On 14 September 2020, the U.S. Air Force confirmed that it has designed, built and flown at least one prototype of its next-generation fighter.

In November 2022, Northrop Grumman claimed that its B-21 Raider would be "the world's first sixth-generation aircraft."

The winner of the NGAD program was revealed to be the Boeing F-47 on 21 March 2025.

==== Concepts and technologies ====
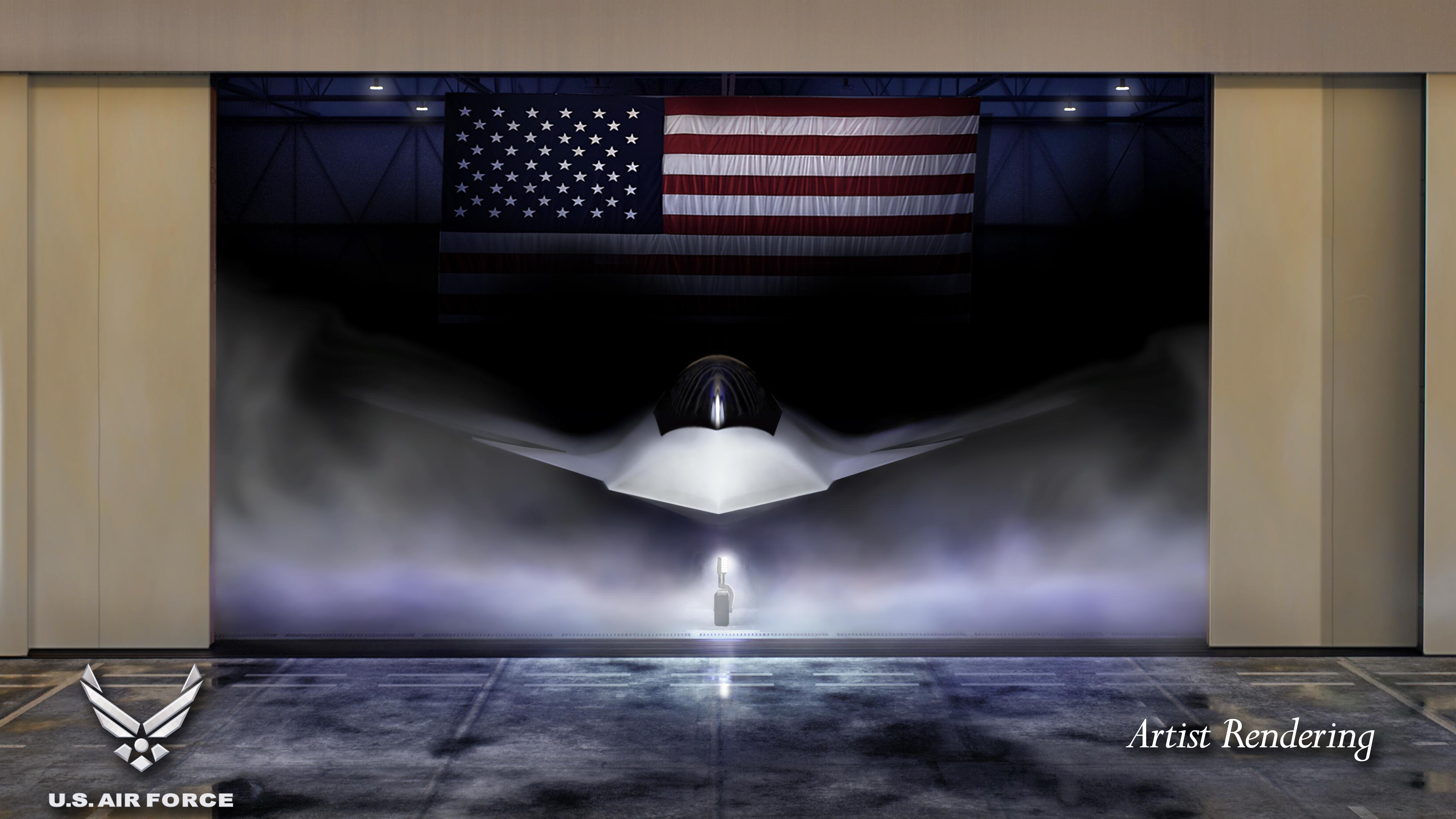
Artist's rendering of the Boeing F-47

The Navy and Air Force visions for their respective next-generation jet concepts agree on some fundamental characteristics: These include the need for artificial intelligence as a decision aid to the pilot, similar in concept to current sensor fusion; non-GPS positioning-navigation-timing gear, and communications that allow big-data movement between aircraft.

The Air Force regards stealth technology as extremely important for the F-X, while the Navy say the F/A-XX should not be so focused on survivability as to sacrifice speed and payload. Unlike the previous F-22 and F-35 development programs that depended on new technologies that drove up cost and delayed introduction, the Air Force is intending to follow a methodical path of risk reduction to include as much prototyping, technology demonstration, and systems engineering work as possible before creation of an aircraft actually starts. Sixth-generation strike capability is envisioned as a move beyond the limitations inherent to the potential abilities of a single strike aircraft. 6th-gen combat awareness will require a theater-wide integration of diverse systems beginning with the primary airborne sensory suite and further including real-time data linking of ground-based detection and ranging technology with sensors aboard primary and support aircraft, advanced communication capabilities, unparalleled capacity for continuous onboard info-stream processing utilizing AI for real-time data translation and rendering geared toward optimizing pilot situational awareness while reducing workload, potential near-space capabilities, extension of existing strike/standoff ranges, seamless co-operation with ground-to air defense assets and the ability to deploy aircraft in manned, optionally manned, unmanned and stand-in options.

In March 2015, the Navy revealed they were working with the Air Force to potentially release joint analysis of alternatives (AoA) in 2016 for their next-generation fighters; they are allowed to take a joint AoA, then define a service solution that would be good for each service. The Navy is focusing on replacing the capabilities of the fighter with a wide range of options for the Super Hornet, as well as the EA-18G Growler. The AoA will run parallel to several other design and technology efforts including engine technology, airframe molds, broadband and IR stealth, and new ways to dominate the electromagnetic spectrum. Part of the Navy's calculus will be based on how the F-35C performs as a critical forward sensor node for the carrier air wing. How the fifth-generation F-35C integrates with the rest of the air wing to give greater capabilities than what the platform itself can do may lend itself to the sixth-generation F/A-XX. The Navy aircraft is to have greatly increased speed and range compared to the Super Hornet.

In April 2015, the Center for Strategic and Budgetary Assessments (CSBA) released a report concluding that the next-generation U.S. Air Force fighter should be larger and more resembling a bomber than a small, maneuverable traditional fighter. It analyzed over 1,450 air-to-air engagements since 1965 and found that long-range weapons and sensors have dramatically decreased instances of dogfighting. With the increase of air defense systems using electronic and infrared sensors and high-speed weapons, traditional designs relying on small size, high speed, and maneuverability may be less relevant and easier to intercept. As a result, the CSBA suggests building a fighter significantly larger relying on enhanced sensors, signature control, networked situational awareness, and very-long-range weapons to complete engagements before being detected or tracked. Larger planes would have greater range that would enable them to be stationed further from a combat zone, have greater radar and IR detection capabilities, and carry bigger and longer-range missiles (Long-Range Engagement Weapon). One airframe could be fitted with various attachments to fill several roles. The concept of a small number of large, intercontinental and heavily armed combat aircraft could link itself to the development of the Long Range Strike Bomber.

In November 2016, the USAF Scientific Advisory Board announced studies for a Penetrating Counter Air (PCA) platform that would combine long range, supersonic speed, stealth and maneuverability; and be fielded by 2030. PCA would have substantially longer range to fly long distances over the Pacific, especially in a situation where airbases in the vicinity of China are not available or if aerial tankers are destroyed. It would also escort bombers deep into Russia or China, where the anticipated threat includes advanced networked air defense radars. It would include stealth against low or very high frequency radars (like those of the S-400 missile system), which requires an airframe with no vertical stabilizers. Another requirement is significantly larger payload than current air superiority aircraft like the F-22. Adaptive cycle engine technology is an option under consideration for the PCA, given the fact that the alternative would be a very large aircraft.

While current engines operate best at a single point in the flight envelope, sixth-generation engines are expected to have a variable cycle to give optimum efficiency at any speed or altitude, giving greater range, faster acceleration, and greater subsonic cruise efficiency. The engine would configure itself to act like a turbojet at supersonic speeds, while performing like a high-bypass turbofan for efficient cruising at slower speeds; the ability to supercruise will likely be available to aircraft with this engine type. The technology is being developed by the Air Force under the Adaptive Engine Transition Program (AETP) and by the Navy under its Variable Cycle Advanced Technology (VCAT) program. The Air Force is aiming for a Milestone A decision by 2018, with a production version to be ready possibly by 2021. Companies involved with next-generation engine development include General Electric and Pratt & Whitney. Risk reduction began in 2012 so that engine development can start around 2020. An engine is to be ready when fighters are introduced by the Navy in 2028 and the Air Force in 2032.

The Air Force is interested in lasers both for low-power illumination and as higher-powered weapons. In November 2013, the Air Force Research Laboratory released a request for information (RFI) for submissions with detailed descriptions in a militarily useful configuration, potential problems and solutions, and cost estimates.

== History of countries with planned or cancelled programs ==
=== Brazil ===
On 6 May 2024, during a press trip at the Embraer factory in the city of São José dos Campos, São Paulo, the Director of Industrial Cooperation of Saab in Brazil, Luiz Hernandez, stated that Brazil will develop a sixth-generation fighter based on technologies from the Saab JAS 39 Gripen, already in production in the country. The project would be a cooperation between Embraer and the Department of Aerospace Science and Technology. The Vice President of Embraer's defence division, Walter Pinto Junior, confirmed the idealization of the project, and commented that "for Embraer, fighter aviation is a possibility of taking higher flights", but highlighted that the company still needs a "business plan, to make a viable long-term project".

=== France, Germany, Spain (cancelled) ===
Within the Future Combat Air System (FCAS) programme, France, Germany, and Spain were jointly working on a sixth-generation fighter known as the Next-Generation Fighter (NGF) until the project was cancelled in 2026.

=== India ===
As of 2026, India does not have an indigenous 6th-generation fighter program and is considering joining a European-based 6th-generation fighter program. On 8 October 2020, Air Chief Marshal Rakesh Bhadauria said the Indian Air Force (IAF) has a clear roadmap for sixth-generation combat systems such as directed energy weapons, smart wingman concept, optionally manned combat platforms, swarm drones, hypersonic weapons, and other equipment. On 22 October 2021, Bhadauria's successor Air Chief Marshal Vivek Ram Chaudhari said India's fifth-generation AMCA, which was then under development, would have some sixth-generation technologies.

=== Russia ===
Russian Mikoyan PAK DP is a rumoured next generation aircraft. On 26 August 2013, Russia revealed it would proceed with development of a sixth-generation jet fighter. They say the aircraft will most likely be pilotless. However, they would not skip completing development of fifth-generation fighter projects, like the Sukhoi Su-57.

Mikoyan PAK DP is a Russian program to develop a next generation interceptor aircraft to replace the Mikoyan MiG-31. According to the Russian defense analyst Vasily Kashin, the aircraft would be considered as a 5++ or 6th generation fighter project. In January 2021, Rostec Corporation, the owner of Mikoyan, announced that the PAK DP had now entered the development phase, saying "Development of the next generation of interceptor fighters has already begun." Russia's aerospace sector is under pressure due to the ongoing war in Ukraine. While Russian state media recently revived discussions about the Mikoyan PAK DP interceptor in 2026, defense experts remain highly skeptical that the aircraft is anything more than a concept.

=== Sweden ===
In March 2024, the Swedish government gave SAAB a contract to explore the cost and feasibility of developing a sixth-generation fighter to replace the JAS 39 Gripen; officials aim to decide by 2031.

=== Turkey ===
In 2024, Haluk Görgün, the head of the Presidency of Defense Industries, stated that the works on the sixth-generation fighter project were underway. Later in 2026, the CEO of the Turkish Aerospace Industries, Mehmet Demiroğlu, has provided a public commentary which acknowledged the sixth-generation combat aircraft program. Although the company has begun work on developing a sixth-generation fighter jet, it has not yet officially announced the name of the program.

== See also ==
- Fifth-generation fighter: The current generation.
- Jet fighter generations: The generations, from first to sixth.
- Lockheed Martin X-44 MANTA
- McDonnell Douglas A-12 Avenger II
- Lockheed Martin FB-22
- Northrop YF-23
- Sukhoi Su-75 Checkmate
