= AVIC Baidi Type-B =

Fictional Chinese spaceplane

The AVIC Baidi Type-B (白帝, lit. "White Emperor") is a fictional 6th generation stealth fighter spaceplane mock-up built by the Aviation Industry Corporation of China (AVIC) and unveiled in November 2024 at the Zhuhai Airshow. At the time, many Western observers, Sinologists and military expert discussed the mock-up as if it was a non-fictional aircraft project. In reality, the Baidi model is a science fiction concept derived from an AVIC-sponsored alien invasion novels, "The Nantianmen Project" (南天门计划) by writer Wu Jun (吴俊), which serve the purpose of generating enthusiasm for military development for Chinese youth. A theme park based on this AVIC fictional universe is scheduled to open in 2027.

== History and reaction ==
In November 2024, AVIC released footage of a mockup of the “integrated space-air fighter”, named Baidi (White Emperor), which AVIC claimed would be capable of operating in outer space. The Baidi is a fictional plane in a popular novel sci-fi series, immediately recognizable to Chinese aviation enthusiasts, but the mockup was interpreted as a real proposal and generated discussions in the West, with many news organizations speculating about its capabilities. Critics quickly pointed out that the claims about space operations lacked evidence and were "dubious", with some soon correctly doubting the aircraft's existence and comparing it to the fictional Darkstar aircraft from the movie Top Gun: Maverick.

According to Chinese sources, the fighter mock-up is derived from a science fiction novel and served as a marketing scheme to increase young people's interest in aviation development. However, commentaries also point out that, as AVIC backed the project, the Baidi could be representative of the vision and technological trends that the Chinese aviation industry was pursuing at time. Meanwhile in China, the sci-fi park "Niantanmen", based on the same novels and intellectual property, is projected to open in 2027.
