= F/A-XX program =

Sixth-generation strike fighter program

F/A-XX
- The Boeing F/A-XX concept design as of 2013

General information
- Role: Multirole strike fighter
- Project for: Multirole fighter
- National origin: United States
- Manufacturer: Boeing
- Issued by: United States Navy

History
- Initiated: April 2012 (RFI)
- Outcome: Boeing selected to develop and produce the F/A-XX
- Related: Next Generation Adaptive Propulsion (NGAP), Next Generation Air Dominance (Air Force)

F/A-XX is a development and acquisition program for a future sixth-generation strike fighter to replace the United States Navy's F/A-18E/F Super Hornet and complement the F-35C beginning in the 2030s. A requirement was first identified in June 2008.

The F/A-XX is the crewed combat aircraft component and centerpiece of the Navy's Next Generation Air Dominance (NGAD) family of systems. Although identically named and sharing some technology developments, this program is distinct from the U.S. Air Force's NGAD sixth-generation fighter program. (Note: To verbally distinguish between the two programs and their spoken acronyms, the Air Force NGAD is pronounced /ˈənɡæd/, while Navy NGAD is pronounced /ˈəndʒæd/ (the "G" pronounced like a "j").)

Boeing was awarded the development contract for the F/A-XX in September 2026, beating Northrop Grumman and securing prime contractor status for both of America's 6th-generation fighters, along with the F-47 for the United States Air Force.

== Requirements ==
=== Strike fighter with air superiority capabilities ===
An early rendering of a proposed Boeing F/A-XX design from January 2011

In April 2012, the Navy issued a formal request for information for the F/A-XX. It calls for a multirole strike fighter to initially complement and eventually supersede the F/A-18E/F Super Hornet and EA-18G Growler aircraft in the 2030s, while complementing the F-35C Lightning II and UCLASS unmanned aircraft, that can operate in anti-access/area denial environments. Primary missions include air combat, air to air, ground attack, surface warfare, and close air support. Platform requirements include supercruise capabilities as well as advanced next-generation stealth features, sensors and radars with networking adaptability. Additional missions and capabilities include air-to-air refueling, Reconnaissance, Surveillance and Target Acquisition (RSTA), and electronic warfare and countermeasures thereof. Manned, unmanned, and optionally-manned operations for a highly adaptive platform will be part of the new system. The F/A-XX is being pursued as F/A-18 Super Hornets will reach the end of their 9,000 hours of service life by the early 2030s. Aside from the option of buying more F-35Cs, the F/A-XX is seeking to create a new aircraft to replace the Super Hornet's capability and mission set. Just as the F-35C replaced aging F/A-18 Hornets and complements Super Hornets, the F/A-XX will replace aging Super Hornets in the 2030s and complement the F-35C.

The U.S. Navy has indicated that in contrast to the U.S. Air Force's Penetrating Counter-Air (PCA) crewed air superiority fighter for their NGAD program, the F/A-XX is intended to be a strike fighter that primarily focuses on surface attack while having a secondary air superiority role. The aircraft is to have a 25% range increase over existing strike fighters in the inventory.

=== Maximum connectivity and sensors ===
Although the F/A-XX platform will be a sixth-generation fighter aircraft, the Navy is reluctant to talk about a new aircraft because the project is still in development, and for national security concerns. A range of next-generation technologies may be explored including maximum sensor connectivity, and electronically configured "smart skins". Maximum connectivity refers to massively increased communications and sensor technology, such as having the ability to connect with satellites, other aircraft, and anything providing real-time battlefield information. Smart skins would have sensors and electronics integrated into the fuselage of the aircraft itself to increase sensor performance while reducing drag and increasing speed and maneuverability.

=== Open architecture ===
An open architecture design is desired, allowing for different sensors, payloads, and weapons to be used to meet specific mission requirements and be able to be moved around for multiple different missions on different days or different sorties. The resulting open architecture design is likely to take shape depending on which style of new propulsion system is presented by the aircraft industry.

=== Propulsion ===
The Navy has worked with the U.S. Air Force on adaptive-cycle engine technology, which can benefit a next-generation tactical fighter with supercruise ability. However, there is significant disagreement over the Air Force's claims that adaptive-cycle jet engine technology, where the ratios of bypass and compression airflow can be made variable to improve efficiency, can benefit a carrier-based fighter. Ultimately, in order to reduce costs and development timelines, the Navy has decided to pursue less risky derivative turbofans rather than the more ambitious adaptive-cycle engines.

=== New spectrum of weapons ===
Chief of Naval Operations (CNO) Jonathan Greenert speculated in February 2015 that the F/A-XX would not rely primarily on speed or stealth as much as previous-generation jet fighters due to better signature detection and proliferating high-speed anti-aircraft weapons. Instead, in addition to its protective features provided by its stealth features, technologies, maneuverability and speed, the fighter is to carry a wide array of new spectrum of advanced weaponry to overwhelm or suppress enemy air defenses and ensure survivability and superiority. One approach could create a minimum cost F/A-XX that uses high-cost, high-performance weapons to defeat threats; according to the Navy's Naval Integrated Fire Control-Counter Air (NIFC-CA) battle network concept, an individual platform would not need to have a full suite of sensors and rely on off-board data-linked information from other platforms to provide targeting information and guide weapons launched from the platform. The F/A-XX platforms will be made to carry missiles, have power and cooling systems for directed-energy weapons, and have sensors that can target small radar cross-section targets; cyber warfare platforms at a tactical level as part of a family of systems are being explored.

=== Increased payload ===
F/A-XX will have substantially greater range and payload than its predecessors with 25% greater combat radius compared to existing strike fighters, according to service officials.

=== Unmanned ===
In May 2015, Secretary of the Navy Ray Mabus stated that the F/A-XX should be a platform with the capability of optional unmanned autonomous operation. The effort may produce a family of systems to replace the capabilities of the F/A-18E/F and EA-18G rather than a single airframe, and the Navy is now conducting an analysis of alternatives for its next-generation aircraft in partnership with the Air Force. Admiral Jonathan Greenert favored an optionally manned aircraft for a modular section that can either hold a pilot or more sensors.

=== Aircraft carrier compatible ===
The aircraft must be capable of operating from Navy Nimitz-class and Gerald R. Ford-class aircraft carriers.

== Entries ==
In July 2009, Boeing first publicly unveiled a sixth-generation fighter concept for the F/A-XX program requirement officially revealing its project development. Its renderings and concepts showed a stealth twin-engined tailless jet with two-seat tandem cockpit and a blended wing fuselage. Boeing disclosed that it is intended to be manned or unmanned depending on the mission. The fighter concept is in the 40,000 lb (18,000 kg) weight class. The Northrop Grumman X-47B that was chosen for the UCAS-D program has also been proposed for the F/A-XX effort.

Boeing unveiled an updated F/A-XX sixth-generation fighter concept in April 2013. The concept is a tailless twin-engine stealth fighter available in manned and unmanned configurations. It has canards, which usually compromises frontal radar cross-section, unless designed and managed by software correctly. The lack of a tail shows an emphasis on all-aspect stealth. It also has diverterless supersonic inlets similar to the F-35. The manned version seems to have restricted rearward visibility without the aid of a sensor.

On 5 March 2025, Reuters reported that Lockheed Martin had been eliminated from the program as its proposed design failed to meet necessary criteria to move forward in the competition. This left Boeing and Northrop Grumman as the remaining competitors in the program.

== Program timeline ==
In 2011, the U.S. Department of Defense (DoD) planned to replace older F/A-18C/D Hornets with 220 F-35s. In March 2011, a Navy analysis of alternatives (AoA) showed that it might buy more F-35C aircraft, develop a new platform, or do both for its NGAD fighter program. In a May 2011 report to Congress, DoD revealed that it was considering buying more F-35C fighters to replace 556 Super Hornets.

Northrop Grumman's first publicized rendering for its F/A-XX, as revealed in April 2026.

On 9 September 2014, the Navy announced that an AoA for the F/A-XX aircraft would begin in 2015. Meetings with industry would be held focusing on building new aircraft to meet the requirement, developing a "family of systems" approach, and discussing mission systems, avionics, and new next-generation weapons systems. On 4 April 2019, the director of Air Warfare in the Office of the Chief of Naval Operations stated that the AoA for the F/A-XX was to be completed in the spring of 2019, with a final report due in the summer of 2019. After the F/A-XX AoA was completed in June 2019, the Navy began the concept development phase of the development process. However, concerns were raised about funding, with Bryan Clark of the Hudson Institute predicting that the program would evolve into a modification of the F-35 or F/A-18 Super Hornet.

Until FY 2024, much of the F/A-XX funding were hidden under a classified special access program called Link Plumeria, among the DoD's largest research and development programs. Due to budget constraints, the Navy proposed delaying F/A-XX in its FY 2025 budget request in order to focus on near-term investments. In March 2025, Lockheed Martin was reportedly eliminated from the competition, with a winning design to be selected from Boeing or Northrop Grumman by the end of month. However, funding disputes and concerns regarding industrial design capacity within the DoD has resulted in the program and contract award being delayed.

In July 2025, it was announced that the F/A-XX program received $76 million in funding for fiscal year 2026 while the Boeing F-47 received $3.4 billion in funding. Congress subsequently increased the program's funding by $897.3 million moving it forward into the Engineering and Manufacturing Development (EMD) phase. Congress also directed the navy to move forward with a single EMD contract to accelerate operational fielding.

Boeing was awarded the development contract for the F/A-XX on 29 September 2026, beating Northrop Grumman and securing prime contractor status for both of America's 6th-generation fighters, along with the F-47 for the United States Air Force. "The contract is valued at more than $20B for the full-scale development phase. The contract procures multiple test aircraft for ground, airworthiness, systems, and weapons integration testing."

== See also ==
- Chengdu J-36 – (China)
- Shenyang J-50 – (China)
- Boeing F-47 / Next Generation Air Dominance – (United States) (Air Force)
- Mikoyan PAK DP – (Russia)
- Global Combat Air Programme – (Italy, Japan, United Kingdom)
- Future Combat Air System – (France, Spain, Germany)
