= Jet fighter generations =

Classification scheme of jet fighters

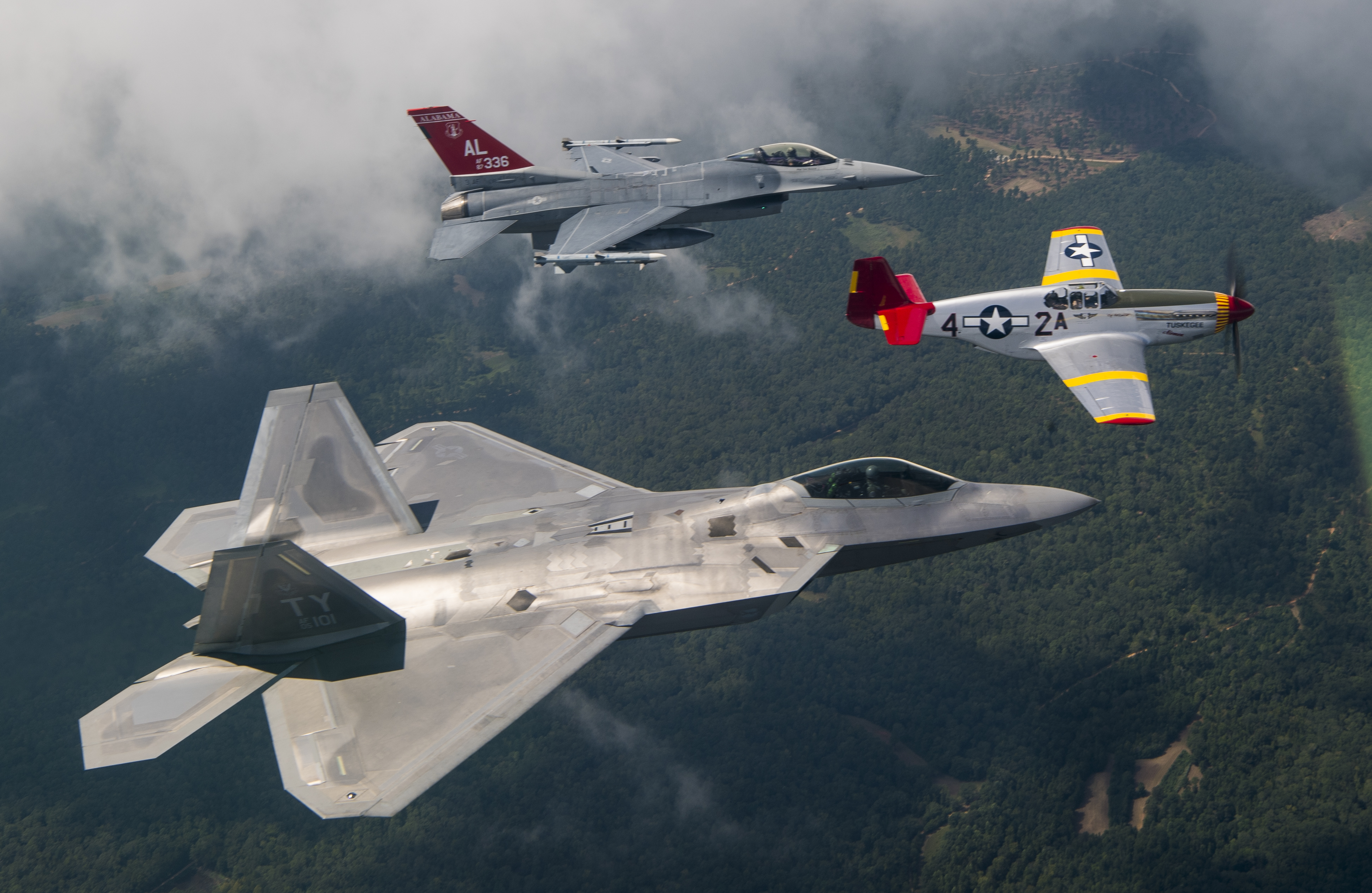
An F-16 Fighting Falcon (top), P-51 Mustang (right), and F-22 Raptor (left); the F-16 belongs to the fourth-generation and the F-22 to the fifth-generation of jet fighters.

Jet fighter generations classify the major technology leaps in the historical development of the jet fighter. Different authorities have identified different technology jumps as the key ones, dividing fighter development into different numbers of generations. Five generations are now widely recognised, with the development of a sixth underway.

== Classification ==
In 1990, air historian Richard P. Hallion proposed a classification of jet fighters into six generations up to that time, broadly described as subsonic, transonic, supersonic, Mach 2, multi-mission, and high-maneuverability. Other schemes comprising five generations up to around the same period have since been described, although the demarcation lines between generations differ. John W.R. Taylor and John F. Guilmartin (Encyclopedia Britannica) follow Hallion, except that they condense the last two into one. A NASA web publication divides jet development, up to 2004, into five stages; pioneer (straight wing), swept wing, transonic, the 1960s and 1970s on, culminating in types such as the F-15, F-16, and AV-8A.

In the 1990s, a different division came into use in Russia, in which a "fifth generation" fighter was proposed as a counter to the Lockheed Martin F-22 Raptor. In contrast, a preceding fourth generation filled in the gap since the era of the F-15 and F-16. This effectively condensed the previous classifications into three generations. In 2004, Aerospaceweb listed one such division into five generations. Although details differ, the basic classification into five generations has since been widely adopted.

The exact criteria for thresholds separating generations are not universally agreed on, and are subject to some controversy. For example, Lockheed Martin's use of the term "fifth generation" to describe its F-22 and F-35 has been challenged by competitors Eurofighter GmbH and Boeing IDS. It has been suggested that Lockheed Martin "labeled the F-35 a 'fifth-generation' fighter in 2005, a term it borrowed from Russia in 2004 to describe the F-22". Some accounts have subdivided the 4th generation into 4 and 4.5, or 4+ and 4++.

The table below shows how some authors have divided up the generations, progressively since 1990.

| Period | Capability | Example aircraft | Hallion (1990) | Aerospaceweb (2004) | People's Liberation Army (2007) | Air Force Magazine (2009) | Air Power Development Centre (2012) | Baker (2018) |
|---|---|---|---|---|---|---|---|---|
| 1942–1950 | High-speed subsonic, conventional armament | Me 262, DH Vampire, P-80 | 1 | 1 | — | 1 | 1 | |
| 1953–1955 | Transonic, air-to-air missiles, fire-control radar | F-86, MiG-15, Hawker Hunter | 2 | 1 | 1 | 2 | 1 | |
| 1953–1960 | Low-speed supersonic, air-to-air missiles, fire-control radar | F-100, MiG-17, MiG-19 | 3 | 2 | 2 | 2 | 2 | |
| 1955–1970 | Supersonic (Mach 2), air-to-air missiles only | F-104, MiG-21, Mirage III | 4 | 2 | 2 | 3 | 2 | |
| 1960–1970 | Multirole / fighter-bomber | F-4, MiG-23, MiG-27, Mirage F1 | 5 | 3 | 2 | 3 | 3 | |
| 1970–1980 | Supersonic multirole | Panavia Tornado, Saab 37 Viggen | 5 | 4 | 3 | 4 | | 4 |
| 1974–1990 | Supersonic multirole, high efficiency, high maneuverability | F-14, F-15, F-16, F/A-18, MiG-29, Su-27, Su-33, J-11, Mirage 2000 | 6 | 4 | 3 | 4 | | 4 |
| 1990–2000 | Enhanced capabilities, advanced avionics, limited stealth | F-15E, Su-30, MiG-35, Su-35, J-15, J-10, JF-17 Thunder | — | 4.5 | 3.5 | 4+ | 4.5 | 4 |
| 2000–present | Advanced integrated avionics, stealth | F/A-18E/F, F-15EX, Rafale, Sukhoi Su-30MKI, Eurofighter Typhoon, JAS 39 Gripen, Tejas Mk1A/Tejas Mk2, KF-21, J-16 | — | 4.5 | 3.5 | 4++ | 4.5 | 4 |
| 2000–present | Advanced integrated avionics, stealth | F-22, J-20, Su-57, F-35, J-35 | — | 5 | 4 | 5 | | |

Five generations are commonly recognised, with the fifth representing the latest generation in service (as of 2018). Future types at an early stage of development are expected to have even further enhanced capabilities and have become known as a sixth generation. The rest of this article broadly follows the analysis of Baker.

=== First ===
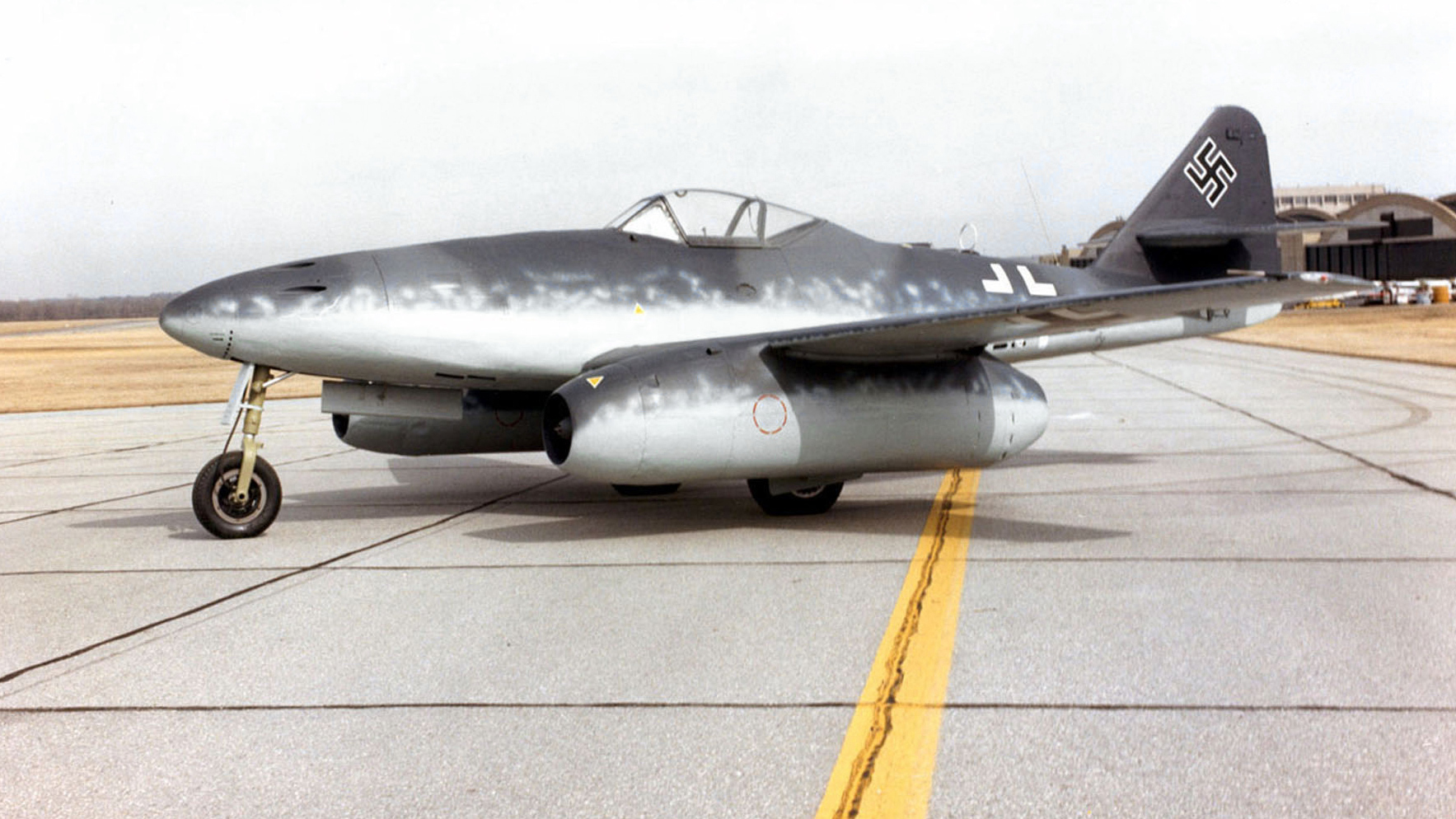
The Me 262 was the first operational jet fighter.

The earliest jet fighters appeared during and after the last years of World War II. They were similar in most respects to their piston-engined contemporaries, having straight, effectively unswept wings and being of wood and/or light alloy construction. They had little or no avionics, with their primary armament being manually-controlled guns. The Messerschmitt Me 262, Heinkel He 162, and Gloster Meteor saw wartime service, while types such as the de Havilland Vampire and Lockheed F-80 had yet to see operational service when the war ended.

The introduction of the swept wing allowed transonic speeds to be reached, but controllability was often limited at such speeds. These aircraft were typically geared towards an air superiority interceptor role. Notable types which took part in the Korean War of 1950–1953 include the Mikoyan-Gurevich MiG-15 and the North American F-86 Sabre. The Hawker Hunter appeared too late for the war but was widely used in subsequent wars. All of these aircraft, however, did not use missiles or rotary cannons.

=== Second ===
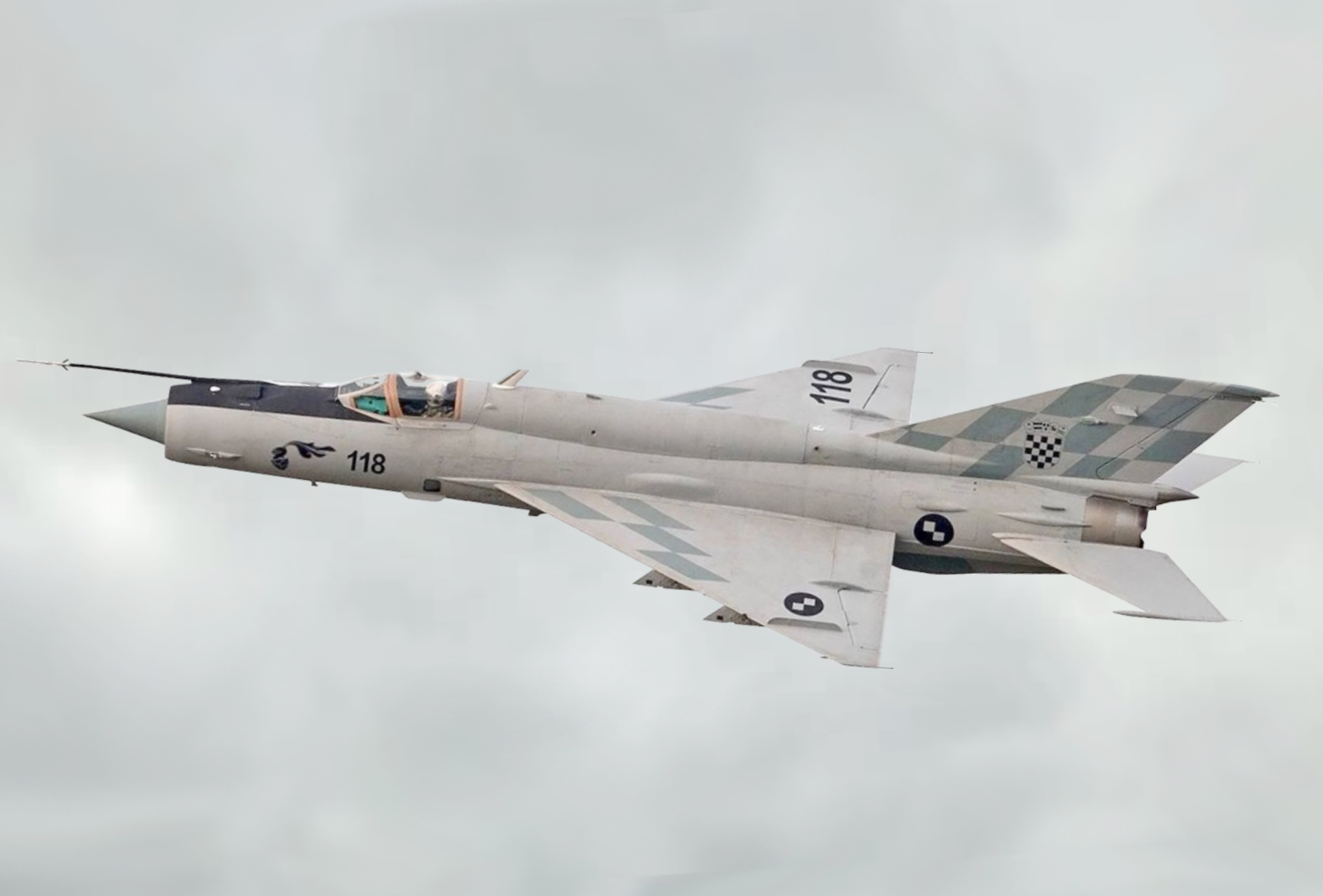
The MiG-21 is the most widely produced jet fighter in history.

The Korean War of 1950–1953 forced a major reconsideration of aircraft design. Guns proved unsuitable at such high speeds, while the need for multirole capability in battlefield support was rediscovered. The first supersonic interceptor-type aircraft emerged after the war used afterburning engines to reach Mach 2, while radar and infrared homing missiles greatly improved their accuracy and firepower.

The American Century Series (such as the Lockheed F-104 Starfighter) as well as the Russian MiG-21, English Electric Lightning, and French Dassault Mirage III were typical of this era. Many types were soon compromised by adaptations for battlefield support roles, and some of these would persist in new variants for multiple generations.

=== Third ===
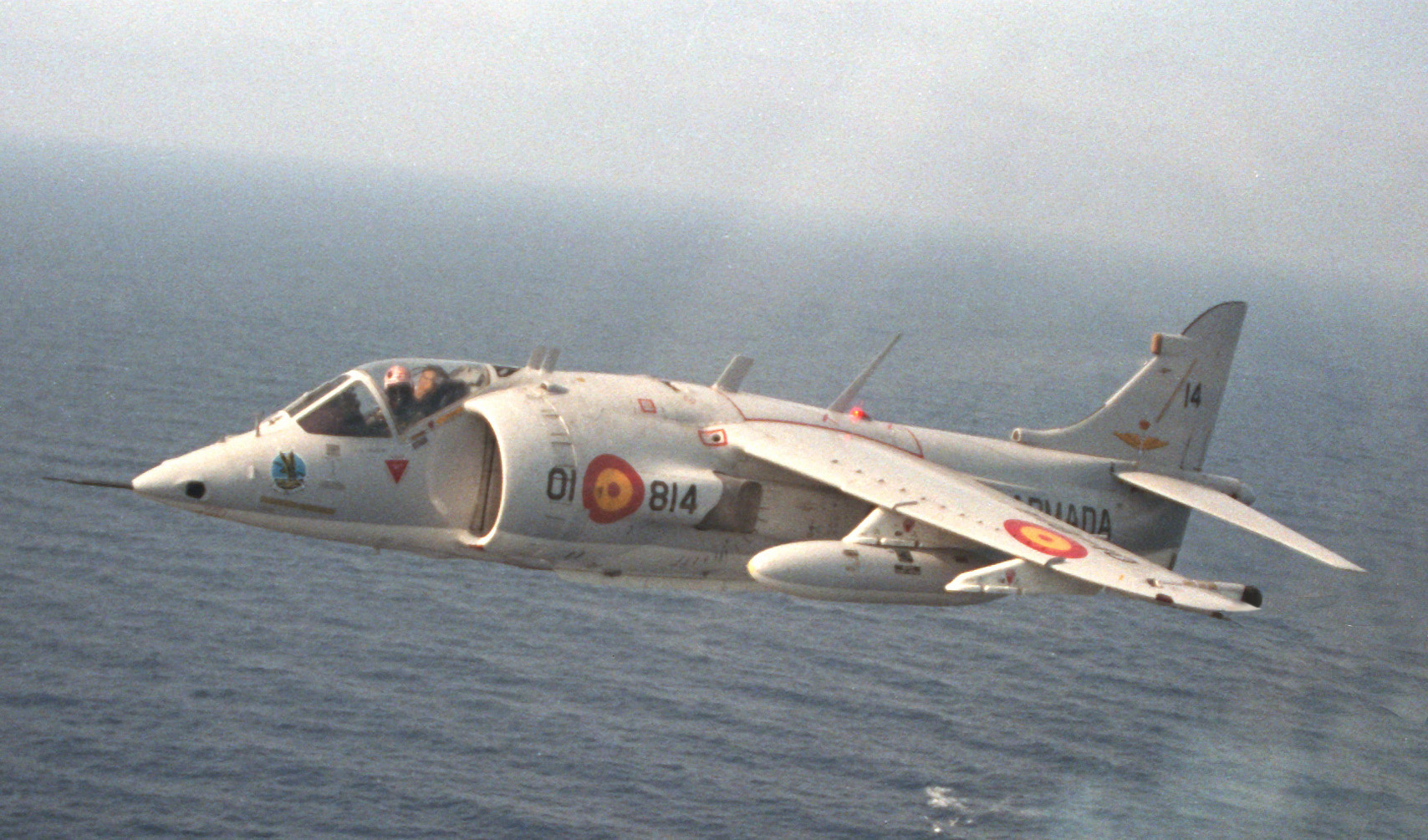
The Hawker Siddeley Harrier was the first operational attack aircraft with vertical/short takeoff and landing (V/STOL) capabilities.

Many third generation fighters were designed with multirole capabilities from the outset. Aircraft of this era were expected to carry a wide range of weapons and other ordnance, such as air-to-surface missiles and laser-guided bombs, while also being able to engage in air-to-air interception beyond visual range. This generation of fighters also brought forth numerous improvements in supporting avionics, including pulse-Doppler radar, off-sight targeting, and terrain warning systems. The advent of more economical turbofan engines brought with it extended range and sortie times, while increasing thrust could only partly deliver better performance and maneuvrability across the speed range. Some designers resorted to variable geometry or vectored thrust in an attempt to reconcile these opposites.

Types such as the McDonnell Douglas F-4 Phantom, Mikoyan-Gurevich MiG-23, Sukhoi Su-17, Shenyang J-8, and Hawker Siddeley Harrier had varying degrees of success.

=== Fourth ===
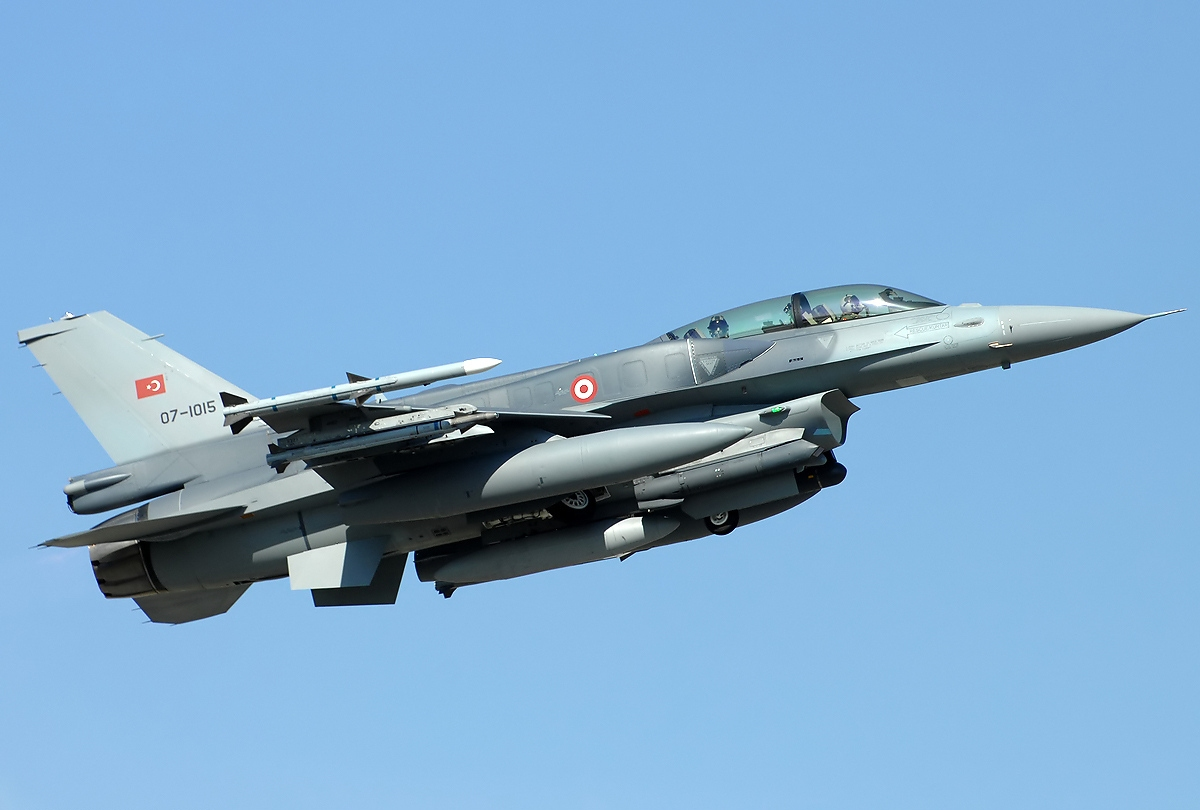
The Lockheed Martin F-16 Fighting Falcon is the second most widely produced jet fighter in history.

Following the successes of the multirole generation, advanced technologies were being developed, such as fly-by-wire, composite materials, thrust-to-weight ratios greater than one (enabling the plane to climb vertically), supermaneuverability, advanced digital avionics and sensors such as synthetic radar and infrared search-and-track, and stealth. As these appeared piecemeal, designers returned to the fighter first and foremost, but with support roles mapped out as anticipated developments.

The General Dynamics F-16 introduced electronic flight control and wing-body blending, while the Saab 37 Viggen broke new ground with its canard foreplanes. The Anglo-American Harrier II and Soviet Sukhoi Su-27 highlighted extreme maneuvrability with, respectively, strengthened exhaust nozzles for "viffing" (vectoring in forward flight) and maneuvering control at high angles of attack (as in Pugachev's Cobra). The Panavia Tornado remained multirole and developed a defensive/offensive sensor, avionics, and weapons suite especially capable of anti-radar and anti-missile ground attack, while the Lockheed F-117 attack aircraft introduced stealth as a design concept.

The Chinese People's Liberation Army (PLA), with a different generation system, classifies most fourth-generation fighters as third-generation.

==== 4.5th ====
Dassault Rafale (France)

Later variants of these and other aircraft progressively enhanced their characteristic technologies and increasingly incorporated aspects of each other's, as well as adopting some emerging fifth-generation technologies such as:

- Active electronically scanned array radar
- Low-probability-of-intercept radar
- Electro-optical targeting systems
- Sensor fusion
- Supercruise
- Link 16-like high-capacity digital network communications
- Use of composite materials to reduce radar cross-section

These partial upgrades to 5th-generation capability have led some commentators to identify these intermediate generations as 4.5, or 4+ and 4++. In some cases, such as the Mikoyan-Gurevich MiG-35 (developed from the MiG-29 with fifth-generation avionics), the upgrade has been classed as fully fifth generation, meeting all fifth gen requirements except stealth. Some of popular 4+ generation models are: Dassault Rafale (France), KAI KF-21 Boramae (S. Korea),Boeing F/A-18E/F Super Hornet Block III (USA), Boeing F-15EX Eagle II (USA), Eurofighter Typhoon FGR4 (UK, Italy, Spain), Saab JAS 39 Gripen E/F (Sweden), Sukhoi Su-35S (Russia), Chengdu J-10C (China). Many of these types remain in frontline service as of 2026.

=== Fifth ===
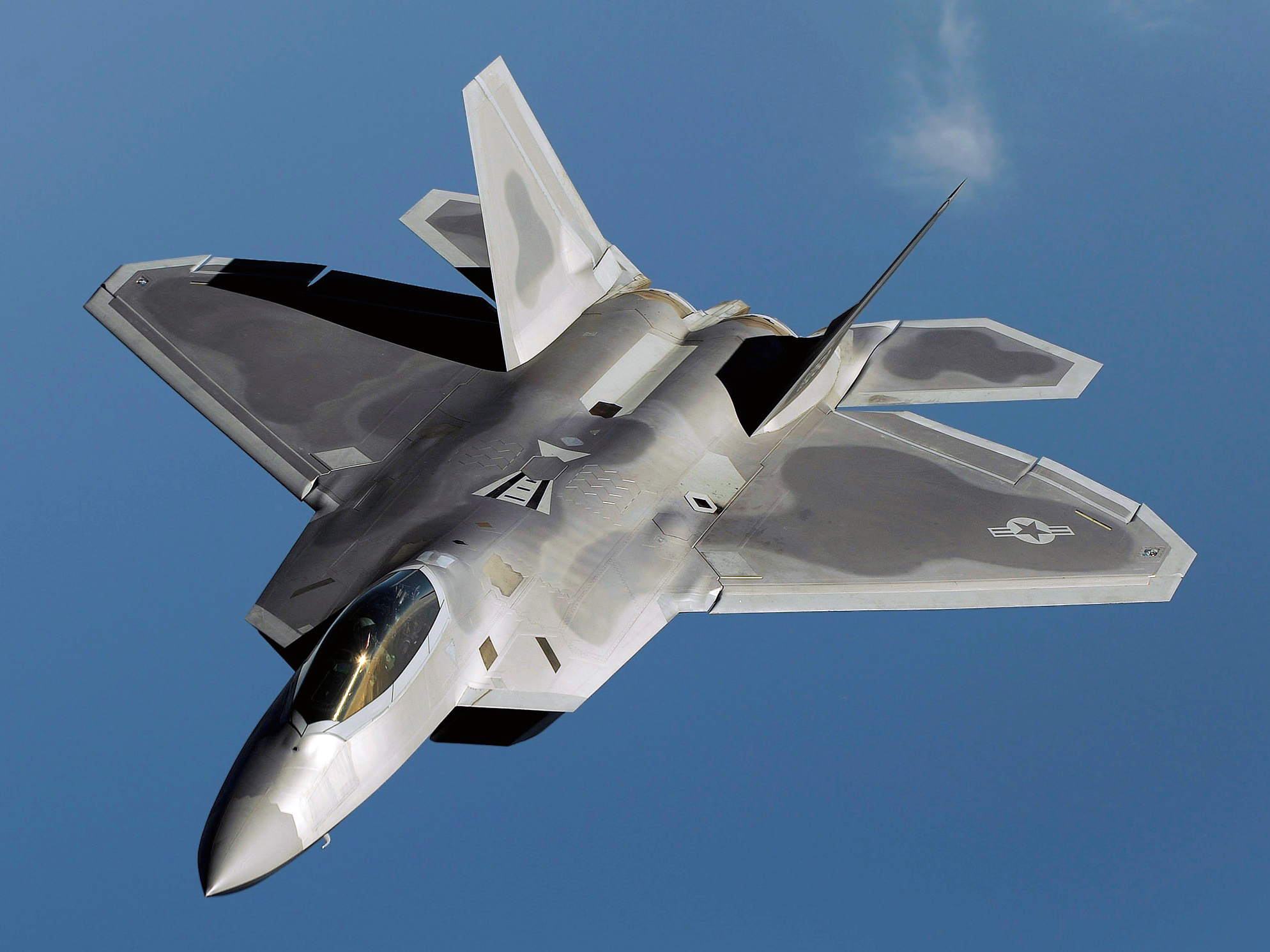
The Lockheed Martin F-22 Raptor is the first operational fifth-generation jet fighter.

The huge advance of digital computation and mobile networking, which began in the 1990s, led to a new model of sophisticated forward C^{3} (command, control, and communications) presence above the battlefield. Such aircraft had previously been large transport types adapted for the role, but information technology had advanced to the point that a much smaller and more agile plane could now carry the necessary data systems. Sophisticated automation and human interfaces could greatly reduce crew workload. It was now possible to combine the C^{3}, fighter and ground support roles in a single, agile aircraft. Such a fighter—and its pilot—would need to be able to loiter for long periods, hold its own in combat, maintain battlefield awareness, and seamlessly switch roles as the situation developed.

Parallel advances in materials, engine technology and electronics made such a machine possible. From the start of the new millennium, advanced systems concepts such as smart helmets, sensor/data fusion, and subsidiary attack drones were becoming realities. Bringing together and integrating such advances, along with those of the fourth generation, created what has become known as the fifth generation of fighters.

The first of these is generally acknowledged to be the Lockheed Martin F-22. Subsequent types include the Lockheed Martin F-35, Chengdu J-20, Shenyang J-35, and Sukhoi Su-57. Some other fifth-generation fighter programs in development are the Tai TF Kaan, AMCA.

=== Sixth ===
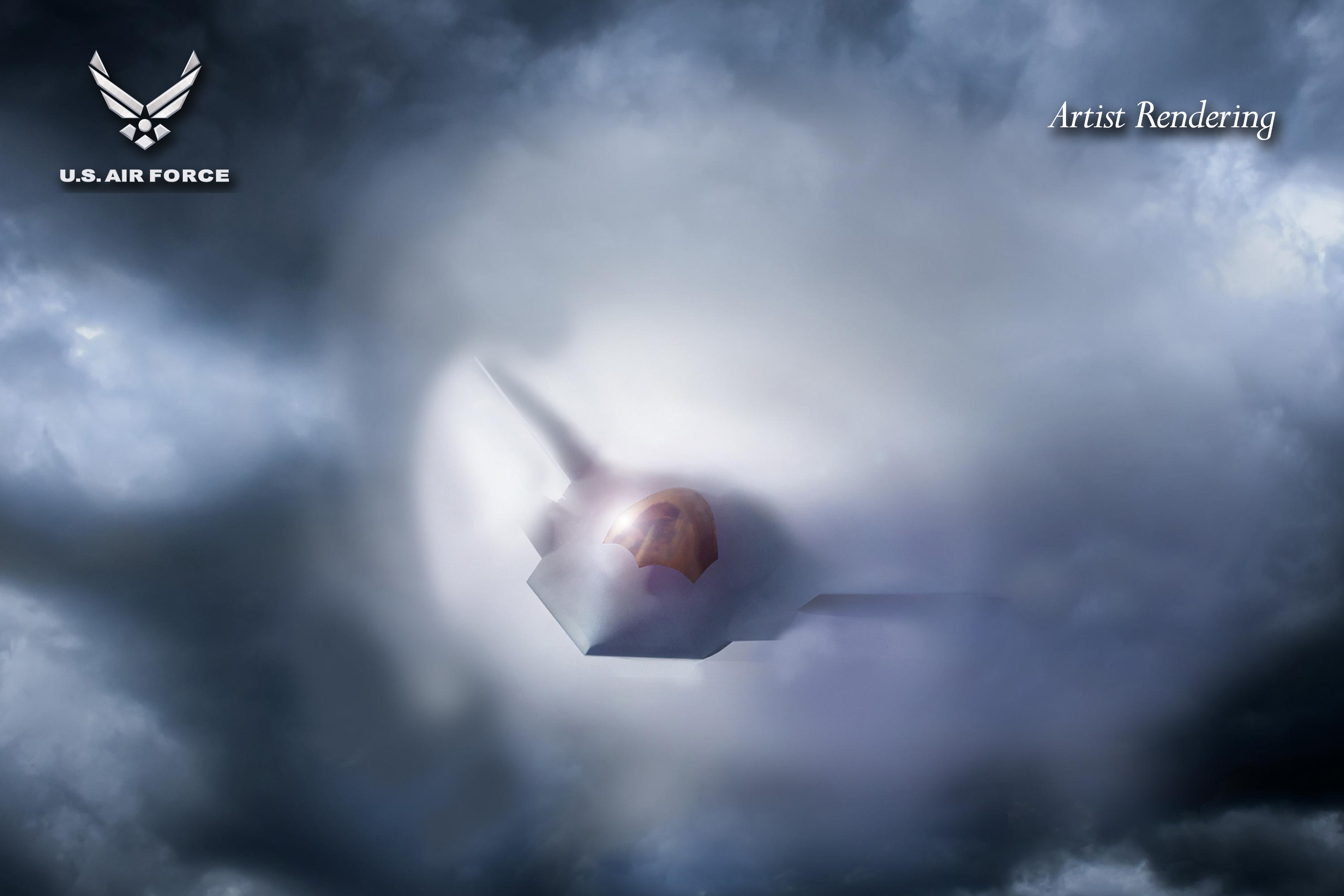
Artist's rendering of the F-47 NGAD fighter aircraft in flight

With the fifth generation slowly coming into service, attention has turned to a replacement sixth generation. The requirements for such a fighter remain under debate. Fifth-generation abilities for battlefield survivability, air superiority and ground support are being enhanced and adapted to the future threat environment. Development time and cost are proving major factors in laying out practical roadmaps. Drones and other remote unmanned technologies are being increasingly deployed on the battlefields of the new millennium, and projects are underway to use them as semi-autonomous "wingmen". They may be integrated with sixth-generation fighter avionics, either as satellite aircraft under a sixth-generation command fighter or even replacing the pilot in an autonomous or semi-autonomous command aircraft.

Studies such as the U.S. F-47 and F/A-XX programs, the European Future Combat Air System (FCAS), the multinational Global Combat Air Programme (GCAP), and Chinese Chengdu J-36 and Shenyang J-50 development are ongoing. Specific requirements are anticipated by some observers to crystalize around 2025.

== See also ==
- Northrop Grumman B-21 Raider, an American "sixth-generation" bomber
