= Boeing F-47 =

Upcoming American sixth-generation fighter aircraft

F-47
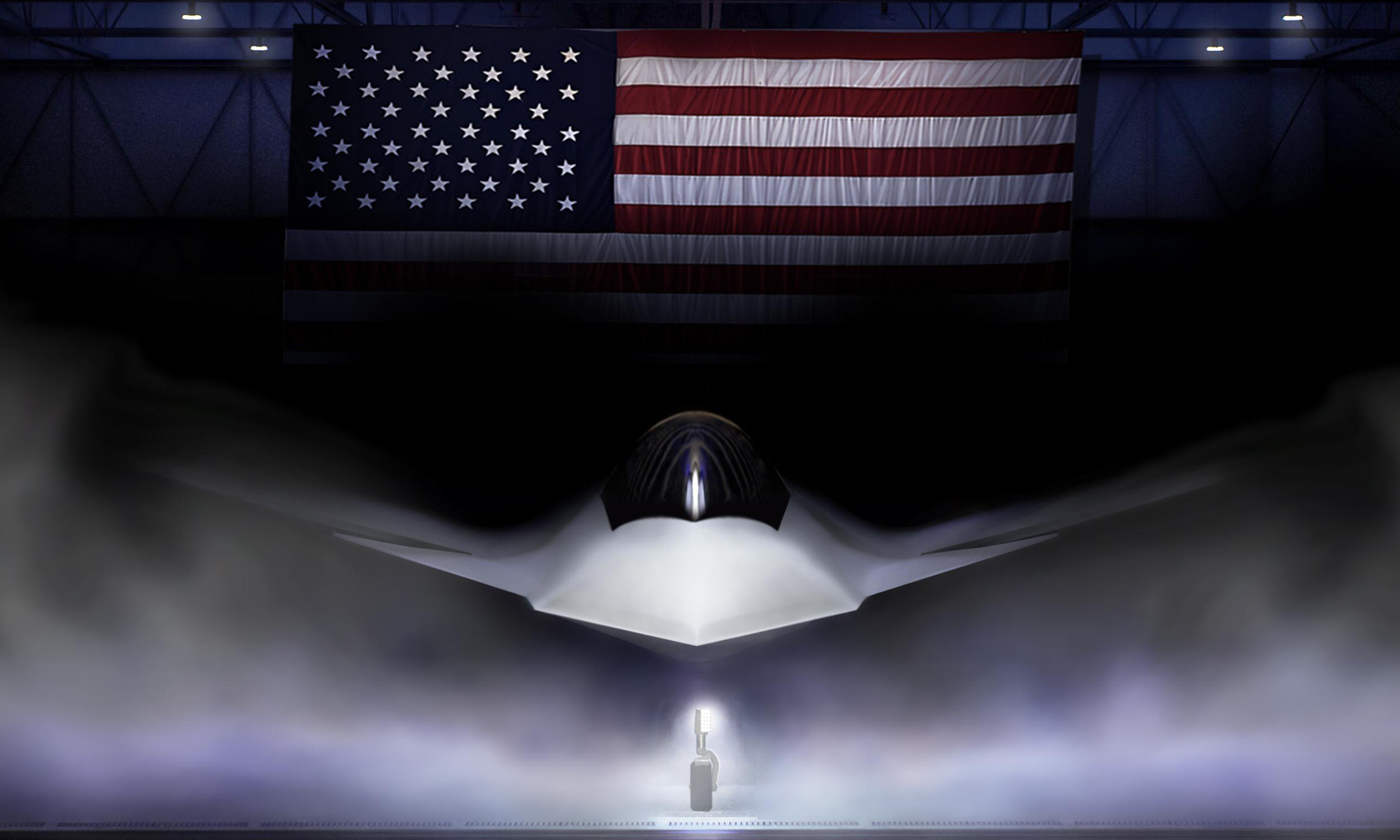
- USAF artist's rendering of an F-47

General information
- Type: Air superiority fighter
- National origin: United States
- Manufacturer: Boeing Defense, Space & Security
- Primary user: United States Air Force

History
- First flight: 2028 (planned)

The Boeing F-47 is a planned American air superiority fighter aircraft under development by Boeing for the United States Air Force (USAF) under the Next Generation Air Dominance (NGAD) program. It is designed to be the first U.S. sixth-generation fighter and the successor to the Lockheed Martin F-22 Raptor. Air Force leaders have said they intend to buy "185-plus" F-47s, which are to have a combat radius of more than 1,000 nautical miles (1,900 km; 1,200 mi) and a top speed above Mach 2. On 21 March 2025, the Department of the Air Force announced it had awarded Boeing the engineering and manufacturing development contract for the NGAD Platform (F-47).

USAF officials have said experimental tests began in 2020. As of 2025, the first flight is expected in 2028, the aircraft is to be operational by 2029, and the service aims to field it in the 2030s.

In September 2025, a patch credited to the F-47 System Management Office (SMO) began circulating on social media, and was confirmed as an "early design concept" by a spokesperson of the Air Force's Air Combat Command (ACC). Based on this concept, the potential name for the F-47 would be "Phoenix". The Latin text on the patch translates as "We overcome, we persevere, we rejoice".

== Development ==
The F-47 program is part of the USAF's Next Generation Air Dominance initiative, which aims to replace the F-22 Raptor fleet. The initiative envisions a "family of systems" approach centered on a fast, long-range, stealthy sensor-shooter crewed fighter aircraft originally called the Penetrating Counter-Air (PCA). In 2014, the Defense Advanced Research Projects Agency (DARPA) launched the Aerospace Innovation Initiative to build X-plane prototypes for developing and maturing next-generation fighter aircraft technologies; the DARPA demonstrators would serve as full-scale flight demonstrators for the PCA, with Boeing first flying its demonstrator in 2019. The PCA was initially expected to operate without needing support from uncrewed collaborative combat aircraft (CCA). But as automation technology advanced, Air Force leaders began planning for drones that could accompany crewed fighters. In March 2023, Air Force secretary Frank Kendall said the service was planning for a notional fleet of about 200 next-generation air dominance fighters and 1,000 advanced drones to carry additional munitions or perform supporting missions.

The winner of the NGAD development contract was to be chosen in 2024, but Kendall paused the program in May 2024 after its projected cost soared, putting the price of each fighter at three times that of a Lockheed Martin F-35 Lightning II. The service launched an internal study to judge whether the program could furnish air dominance amid rapid advances in aviation and air-defense technology, particularly by America's adversaries. Concurrent with NGAD, the service also initiated the Next Generation Adaptive Propulsion (NGAP) program to develop advanced variable-cycle engines for greater subsonic and supersonic efficiency.

In early March 2025, USAF leaders said the study had concluded that NGAD was necessary. "Bluntly, what this study told us, we tried a whole bunch of different options, and there was no more viable option than NGAD to achieve air superiority in this highly contested environment," Major General Joseph Kunkel, director of Air Force Force Design, Integration, and Wargaming, said at the Air & Space Forces Association Warfare Symposium in Colorado. General Kenneth Wilsbach of Air Combat Command added that the U.S. would need crewed sixth-generation aircraft to counter Chinese sixth-generation aircraft. On 21 March 2025, U.S. president Donald Trump announced that the program would move ahead, that its centerpiece aircraft would be called the F-47, and that the engineering and manufacturing development contract, worth more than $20 billion, would be awarded to Boeing.

Air Force officials said the number "47" was chosen because "[it] honors the legacy of the P-47, whose contributions to air superiority during World War II remain historic. Additionally, the number pays tribute to the founding year of the Air Force, while also recognizing the 47th president's pivotal support for the development of the world's first sixth-generation fighter." Freedom of Information Act requests revealed that an Air Force statement explaining the F-47's name was hastily drafted right after the Oval Office announcement took place.

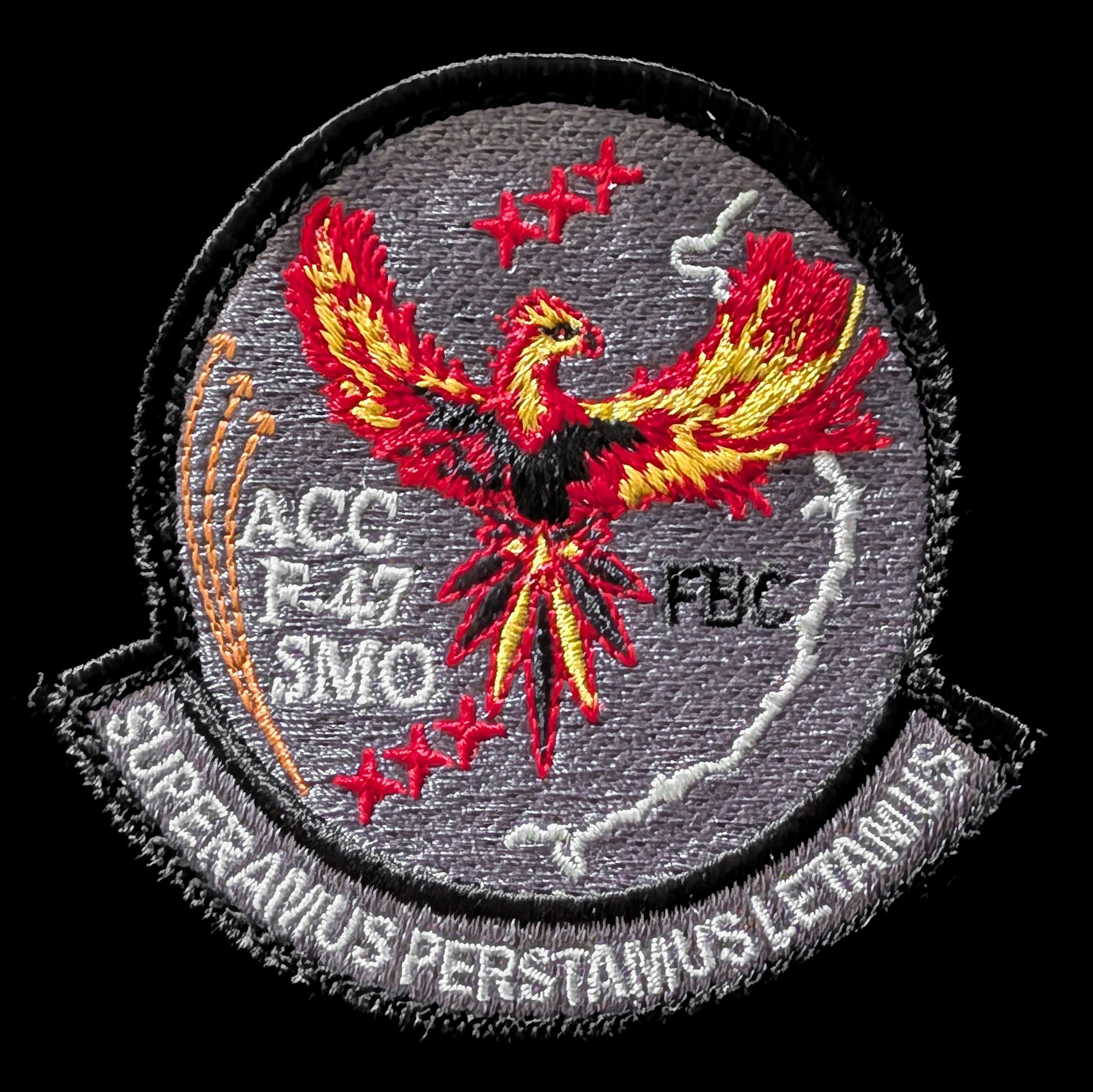
Early concept patch for the F-47 System Management Office of the U.S. Air Force's Air Combat Command, September 2025

This contract is expected to revitalize Boeing's military aviation division, especially its fighter production line in St. Louis, Missouri. Defense One reported that Boeing has invested heavily in its defense division with the aim of returning it to profitability.

The program has been flying X-planes—experimental aircraft meant to prove out design and technological elements—since 2020, Air Force Chief of Staff General David Allvin said in a statement, adding that the F-47 is slated for first flight by the end of Trump's term in early 2029.

In September 2025, Allvin said first flight was now expected in 2028, and that manufacturing of the first F-47 had begun.

== Design ==
Many details of the F-47's design remain classified. In March 2025, Allvin said it will have "significantly longer range, more advanced stealth, be more sustainable, supportable, and have higher availability than our fifth-generation fighters"—that is, the F-22 and F-35. The chief of staff also said it would "cost less" than the F-22, be acquired in larger numbers, be "more adaptable to future threats," and "will take significantly less manpower and infrastructure to deploy." It is anticipated to have a top speed of around Mach 2 and operate with accompanying drones. In May 2025, Allvin posted an infographic that said the F-47 will have a combat radius of more than 1,000 nautical miles, fly faster than Mach 2, and become operational between 2025 and 2029. It also said the Air Force would buy at least 185 examples of the type.

== Specifications ==
Data from Air & Space Forces Association

Performance

- Maximum speed: Mach 2+
- Combat range: 1,000 nmi (1,200 mi, 1,900 km)

== See also ==
- F/A-XX program
- Next Generation Air Dominance

Aircraft of comparable role, configuration, and era

- Boeing F/A-XX
- Chengdu J-36
- Shenyang J-50
- Mikoyan PAK DP
- Global Combat Air Programme

Related lists

- List of fighter aircraft
- List of active United States military aircraft
- List of megaprojects, Aerospace
- List of military electronics of the United States
