= Boeing F/A-XX =

American fighter aircraft

- Artist's rendering of Boeing F/A-XX

General information
- Role: Carrier-based multirole strike fighter
- National origin: United States
- Manufacturer: Boeing Defense, Space & Security
- Issued by: United States Navy
- Status: Prototype development
- Service: 2030s (planned)

The Boeing F/A-XX is an American supersonic carrier-capable, multirole sixth-generation fighter aircraft currently under development. The aircraft is the centerpiece of the U.S. Navy's Next Generation Air Dominance (NGAD) (Note: Not to be confused U.S. Air Force's identically named but distinct NGAD program, which resulted in the Boeing F-47.) family of systems for fielding a sixth-generation strike fighter and is planned to replace the service's F/A-18E/F Super Hornet starting in the 2030s. As of 2026, most of the technical information about this aircraft is still classified.

== History ==
Boeing was awarded the development contract for the F/A-XX on 29 September 2026, beating Northrop Grumman and securing prime contractor status for both of America's 6th-generation fighters, along with the F-47 for the United States Air Force. According to the U.S. Department of Defense, "The contract is valued at more than $20B for the full-scale development phase. The contract procures multiple test aircraft for ground, airworthiness, systems, and weapons integration testing."

== See also ==
Aircraft of comparable role, configuration, and era

- Boeing F-47 - (America)
- Chengdu J-36 - (China)
- Global Combat Air Programme - (Italy, Japan, UK)
- Shenyang J-50 - (China)
