= Mikoyan PAK DP =

Proposed Russian interceptor aircraft

General information
- Type: Stealth interceptor aircraft
- National origin: Russia
- Manufacturer: Mikoyan
- Status: Under development / Concept
- Primary user: Russian Aerospace Forces (intended)

PAK DP (Russian: ПАК ДП, short for: Перспективный авиационный комплекс дальнего перехвата, romanized: Perspektivny aviatsionny kompleks dal'nego perekhvata, lit. ''Prospective air complex for long-range interception'') is a Russian programme to develop a stealth interceptor aircraft/heavy fighter possibly being designed by Mikoyan to replace the Mikoyan MiG-31 in the Russian Aerospace Forces in mid-2030s. Although Russian state media recently revived discussions about the Mikoyan PAK DP in 2026, defense experts remain highly skeptical that the aircraft is anything more than a concept.

== Development ==
As of May 2026, no official data was available concerning the aircraft's capabilities. It was speculated that it could enter service by the mid-2020s or 2030s. As an interceptor, its primary mission was rumored to offset future reconnaissance aircraft currently being developed by the United States and China.

Ilya Tarasenko, the general director of the MiG corporation, as well as the head of the Sukhoi company, said in an interview in July 2020 that the PAK DP will be created on the basis of the MiG-31's design. The PAK DP is also intended to carry anti-satellite missiles.

In January 2021, Rostec Corporation, the owner of Mikoyan, announced that the PAK DP had entered the development phase. However as of September 2026, there is no proof that development has already begun and neither prototypes nor mockups have been observed. Russia's aerospace sector is also under pressure due to the ongoing war in Ukraine.

== Design ==
Director General of RSK MiG Ilya Tarasenko stated that if purchased by the Russian Aerospace Forces, the first production PAK DP would be completed in 2025. An unmanned version is also under consideration.

== See also ==
- Chengdu J-36 – (China)
- Shenyang J-50 – (China)
- Global Combat Air Programme – (Italy, Japan, United Kingdom)
- Boeing F-47 – (United States)
- Boeing F/A-XX – (United States)
