= Jast =

Jast may refer to:

- Joint Advanced Strike Technology (JAST) project was merged with the Common Affordable Lightweight Fighter (CALF) project to make the Joint Strike Fighter program.
- JAST USA
- Jast, a member of the Cult of Skaro in Doctor Who.
- JAST, a Japanese game company known for Tenshitachi no Gogo.
- JAST, Journal of Adhesion Science and Technology.
