= Boeing X-32 =

Multirole combat aircraft prototype by Boeing

X-32 JSF
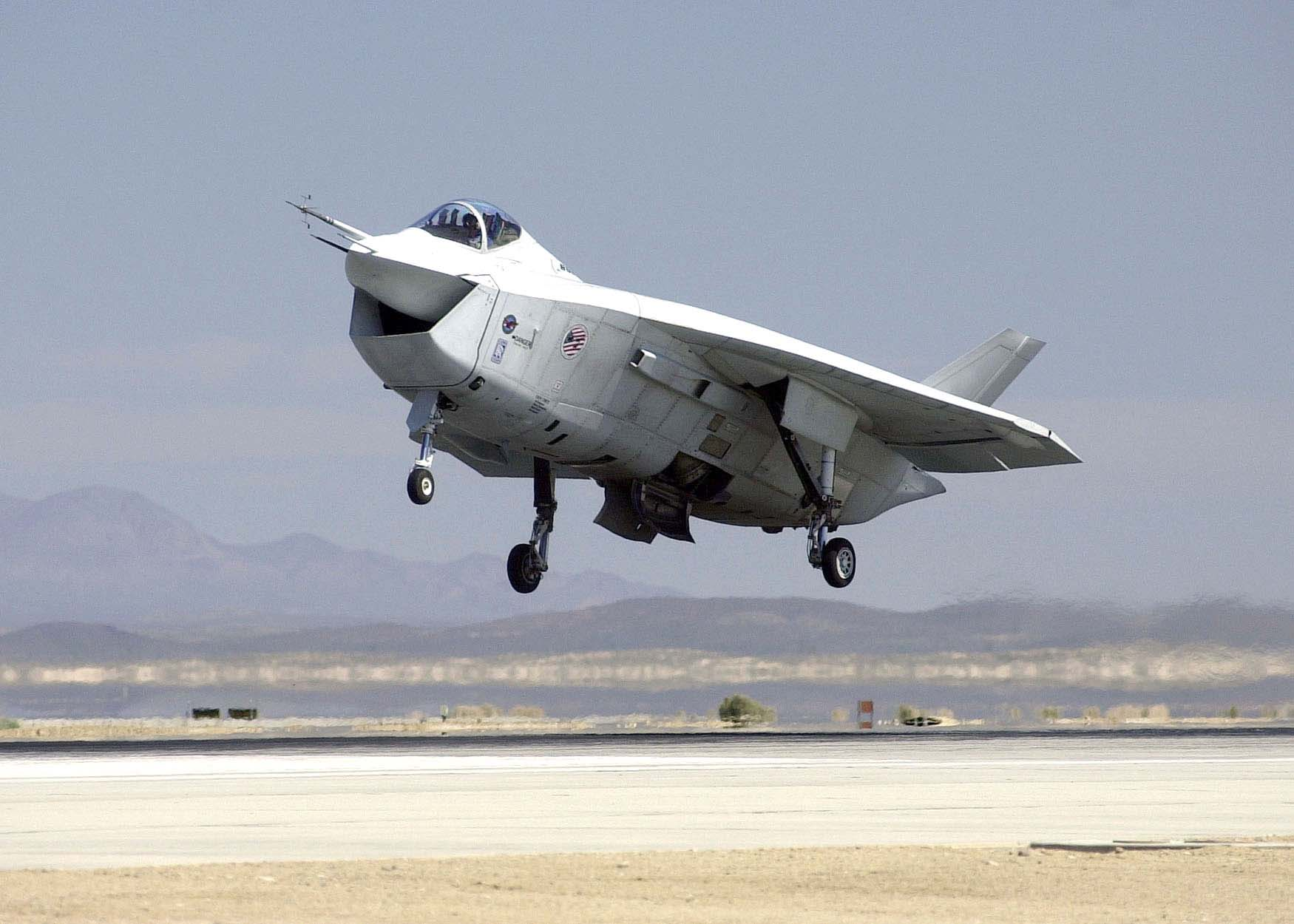
- X-32

General information
- Type: Experimental stealth fighter aircraft
- Manufacturer: Boeing
- Primary user: Defense Advanced Research Projects Agency (DARPA)

History
- First flight: 18 September 2000

The Boeing X-32 is a concept demonstrator aircraft that was designed for the Joint Strike Fighter competition. It lost to the Lockheed Martin X-35 demonstrator, which was further developed into the Lockheed Martin F-35 Lightning II.

== Development ==
=== Background ===
In 1993, the Defense Advanced Research Projects Agency (DARPA) launched the Common Affordable Lightweight Fighter project (CALF). The project's purpose was to develop a stealth-enabled design to replace all of United States Department of Defense lighter weight fighter and attack aircraft, including the F-16 Fighting Falcon, McDonnell Douglas F/A-18 Hornet, and vertical/short takeoff / vertical landing (V/STOL) AV-8B Harrier II. Around the same time, the Joint Advanced Strike Technology (JAST) project was started and in 1994, the U.S. Congress ordered the two to be merged into one program under the JAST name, which was renamed the Joint Strike Fighter (JSF) program in 1995.

Many companies took part in the first phase of this project, which involved drafting concept aircraft designs for submission to the Department of Defense. On 16 November 1996, Boeing and Lockheed Martin were awarded contracts for them to produce two of their concept demonstrator aircraft (CDA) each. Under the contract, these fighters were required to demonstrate conventional take-off and landing (CTOL), carrier take-off and landing (CV version), and short take-off and vertical landing (STOVL). They were also expected to include ground demonstrations of a production representative aircraft's systems, such as the Preferred Weapon System Concept (PWSC).

One major departure from previous projects was the prohibition of the companies from using their own money to finance development. Each was awarded $750 million to produce their two aircraft – including avionics, software and hardware. This limitation promoted the adoption of low cost manufacturing and assembly techniques, and also prevented either Boeing or Lockheed Martin from bankrupting themselves in an effort to win such an important contest.

=== Designing the X-32 ===
Boeing's strategy for a competitive advantage was to offer substantially lower manufacturing and life-cycle costs by minimizing variations between the different JSF versions. The X-32 therefore was designed around a large one piece carbon fiber composite delta wing. The wing had a span of 9.15 meters, with a 55-degree leading edge sweep, and could hold up to 20,000 pounds (9,000 kg) of fuel. The purpose of the high sweep angle was to allow for a thick wing section to be used while still providing limited transonic aerodynamic drag, and to provide a good angle for wing-installed conformal antenna equipment. The wing would prove a challenge to fabricate.

The compete-on-cost strategy also led Boeing to pick a direct-lift thrust vectoring system, for the Marines' short take-off and vertical landing (STOVL) requirement, as this would only necessitate the addition of a thrust vectoring module around the main engine. However, this choice required the engine to be mounted directly behind the cockpit, and moved the center of gravity forward from its usual position in jet fighters (towards the rear of the airplane) to enable a neutral-attitude hover. Boeing had proposed, in the 1960s, a similar supersonic fighter with a mid-center-of-gravity mounted engine with vectored thrust nozzles, but this never proceeded beyond pictures published in Aviation Week. By comparison, the Lockheed entry looked like, if anything, a smaller version of the F-22 Raptor stealth fighter. Yet another effect of the selection of the direct-lift system was the large chin-mounted air intake. This was required to feed sufficient air to the main engine (to provide the thrust necessary to hover) during the zero horizontal velocity phase, when it could not exploit ram-air pressure. A knock-on effect of this large intake was the potential direct visibility of the compressor blades to radar (see radar cross-section). Mitigation possibilities included variable baffles designed to block incoming radio waves without adversely affecting airflow.

=== Design changes ===
The two X-32 aircraft featured a delta wing design. However, eight months into construction of the concept demonstrator aircraft, the JSF's maneuverability and payload requirements were refined at the request of the Navy and Boeing's delta wing design fell short of the new targets. Engineers altered the aircraft's design with a conventional canted twin tail that reduced weight and improved agility, but it was too late to change the demonstrator aircraft. It was judged that they would be sufficient to demonstrate Boeing's technology.

On 14 December 1999, Boeing unveiled both its concept demonstrators at its plant in Palmdale, California, in front of 5,500 attendees. While the X-32A was expected to make an appearance, the roll out of the X-32B was a surprise, as construction of the latter aircraft had started some three months after the former and was completed six weeks after the X-32A. Boeing attributed the rapid construction of the STOVL version to the use of digital design and assembly methods. After having the Pratt & Whitney F119 engine installed in April 2000, the X-32A commenced low- and medium-speed taxi tests, which had been completed by late May.

== Flight testing ==
Due to the heavy delta wing design of the X-32, Boeing demonstrated STOVL and supersonic flight in separate configurations, with the STOVL configuration requiring that some parts be removed from the fighter. The company promised that their conventional tail design for production models would not require separate configurations. By contrast, the Lockheed Martin X-35 concept demonstrator aircraft were capable of transitioning between their STOVL and supersonic configurations in mid-flight.

The first flight of the X-32A (designed for CTOL and carrier trials) took place on 18 September 2000, from Boeing's Palmdale plant to Edwards Air Force Base. The aircraft, piloted by Boeing test pilot Fred Knox, took 2,200 feet (670 m) of runway before becoming airborne at 150 knots (280 km/h; 170 mph) at around 8:00 am. Shortly after takeoff, a minor hydraulic leak was discovered and the flight was shortened to 20 minutes from the expected 30–40 minutes. According to Knox, the F/A-18 chase plane required "a lot of afterburner" to keep up with the X-32 during the initial stages. During the flight, the aircraft reached 10,000 feet (3,000 m), attained a speed of 200 knots (370 km/h; 230 mph), and attained an angle of attack of 13°. Despite the shortened flight, about 80% of the planned test points were accomplished. It was powered by a conventional derivative of the F-22 afterburning turbofan, designated F119-PW-614C.

On 29 March 2001, the X-32B STOVL version made its first flight. The flight lasted 50 minutes as the aircraft flew from Palmdale to Edwards AFB. The flight had originally been scheduled for the third quarter of 2000. A modified version of the -614C engine, known as the F119-PW-614S, powered the STOVL aircraft. In normal flight, the -614S was configured as a conventional afterburning turbofan. However, in the STOVL mode a butterfly valve diverted the core stream exhaust gases to a pair of thrust vectoring nozzles located close to the aircraft's center-of-gravity. Forward of these nozzles, a jet screen nozzle provided a sheet of cool bypass air to minimise hot gas recirculation. There was also a pair of ducts leading to roll nozzles near the wing tips. Two pairs of ducts fed the aft-pitch yaw nozzles and the forward-pitch nozzles. The afterburner was unlit, with no gas flow during lift. The X-32B achieved STOVL flight in much the same way as the AV-8B Harrier II with thrust vectoring of the jet exhaust. A smooth transition (between STOVL and normal modes) was obtained by maintaining a constant engine match, facilitated by the control system algorithm maintaining a fixed total nozzle effective area. Thus the engine was unaware of various nozzles being opened up and closed off to complete the transition.

The F119-PW-614S was a direct lift engine, whereas the Lockheed Martin STOVL team used a more complex and riskier alternative, known as the F119-PW-611, which comprised a remote shaft-driven lift fan powered by the main engine. However, this generated more lift thrust than possible with only direct exhaust gases. A successful design would have greater payload, and thus longer range than a simple thrust vectored turbofan. Flight testing of both companies' aircraft continued until July 2001.

=== JSF competition ===
Boeing's JSF production mockup. Note the separate wing and tailplanes.

On 26 October 2001, the Department of Defense announced that the Lockheed Martin X-35 had won the JSF competition. The X-35 would be developed into the production Lockheed Martin F-35 Lightning II.

The loss of the JSF contract to Lockheed Martin in 2001 was a major blow to Boeing, as it represented the most important international fighter aircraft project since the Lightweight Fighter program competition of the 1960s and 1970s, which had led to the F-16 Fighting Falcon and F/A-18 Hornet. At the time, the production run of the JSF was estimated at anywhere between 3,000 and 5,000. Prior to the awarding of the contract, many lawmakers pushed the idea of retaining the losing competitor as a sub-contractor; however, the "winner takes all" principle was not changed. Nonetheless, Boeing views its work on the X-32 as a strategic investment, yielding important technologies which it has been able to adopt in the Boeing F/A-18E/F Super Hornet and other studies.

== Surviving aircraft ==
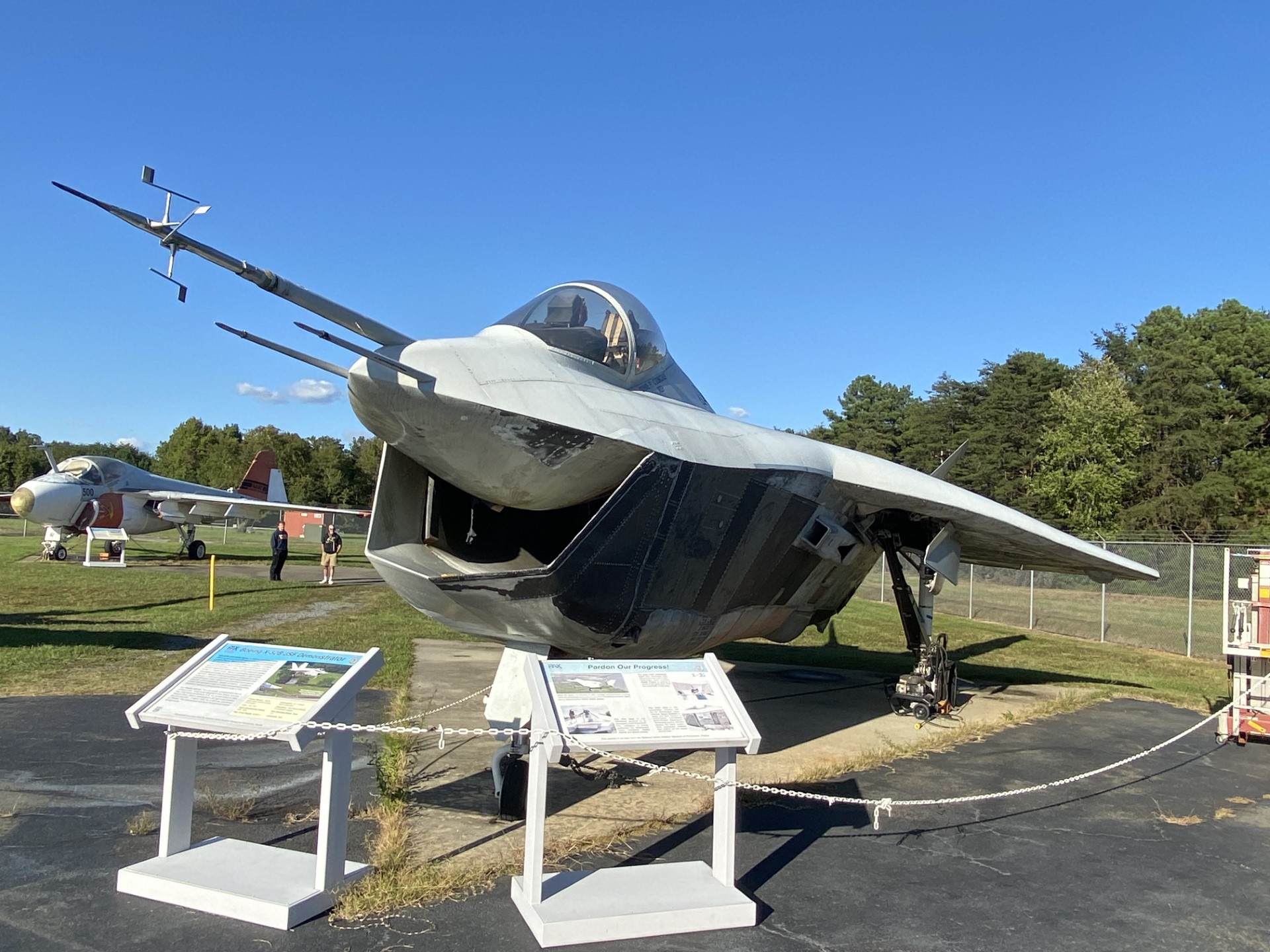
X-32B in deteriorated state on display at Patuxent River Naval Air Museum, 2023

In 2005, the Boeing X-32A was transferred to the National Museum of the United States Air Force near Dayton, Ohio. Its condition deteriorated due to being outside for several years following the end of the JSF competition. In December 2023, the museum completed a three-month-long restoration of the aircraft. On 31 May 2024, the X-32A was moved into the R&D gallery as a display, parked close to the similarly ill-fated YF-23 "Black Widow II".

In 2005, the X-32B was transferred to the Patuxent River Naval Air Museum adjacent to NAS Patuxent River in St. Mary's County, Maryland.

== Gallery ==
=== Restoration of X-32A ===
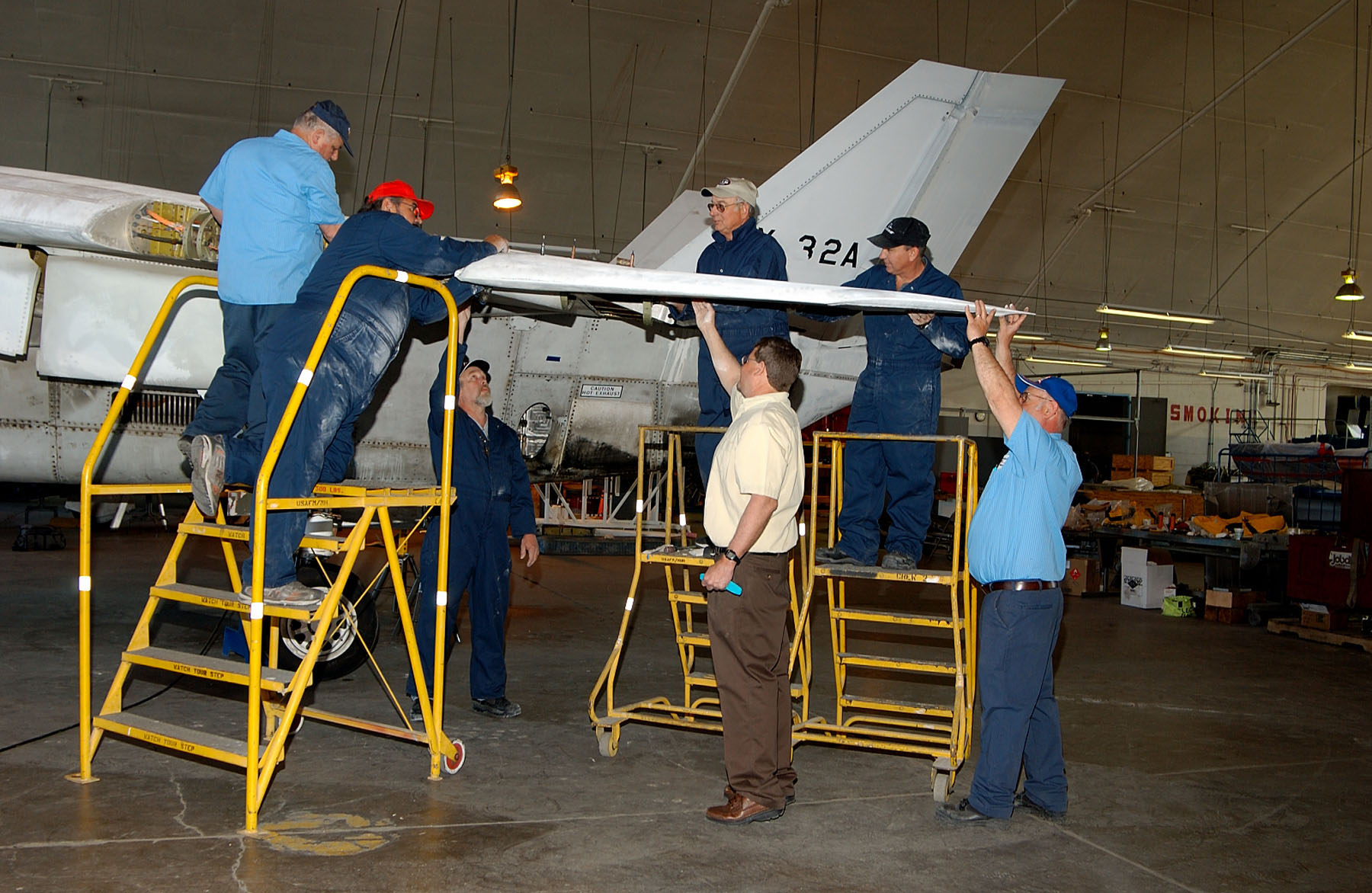
2005 restoration work

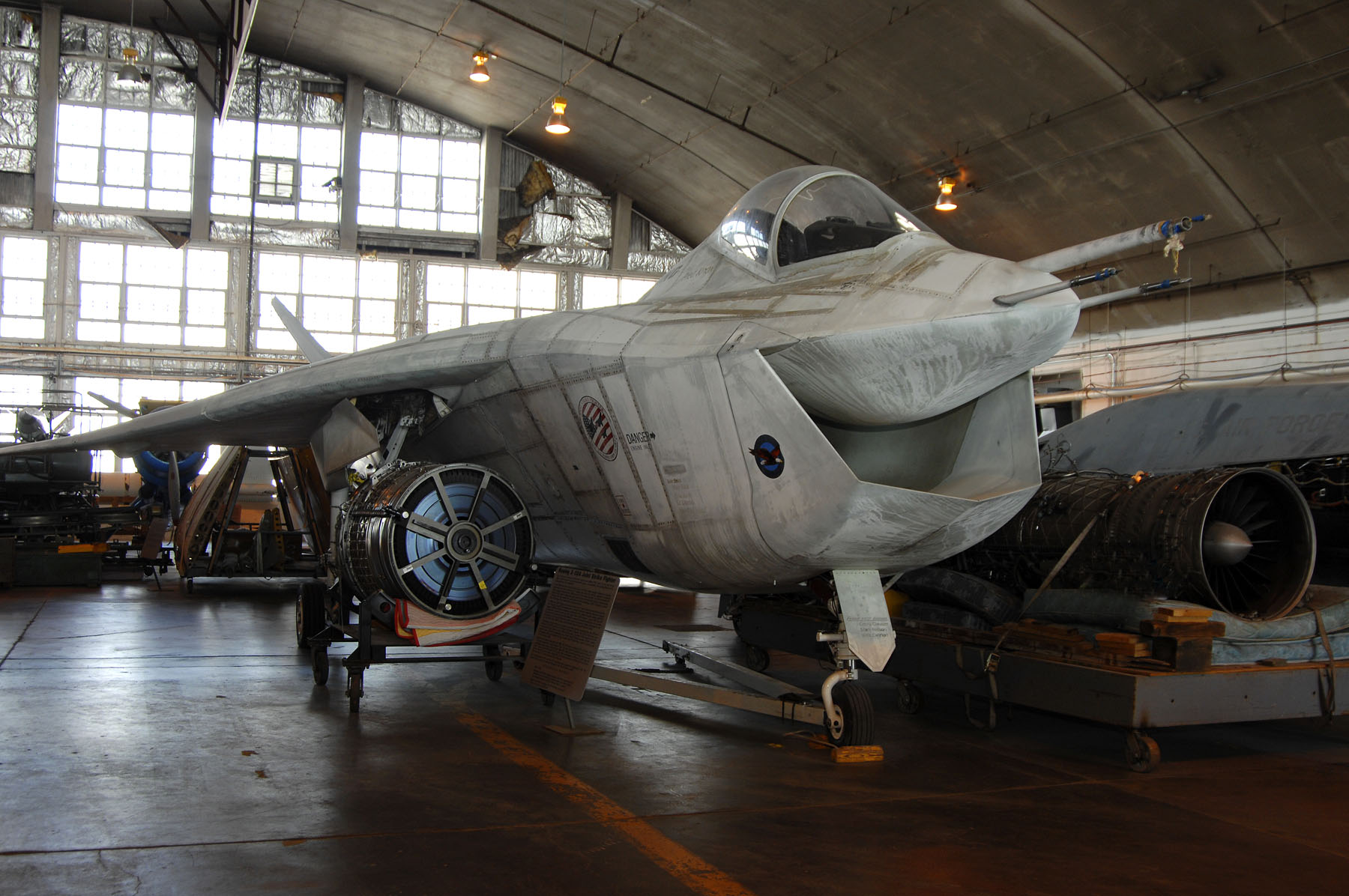
2007

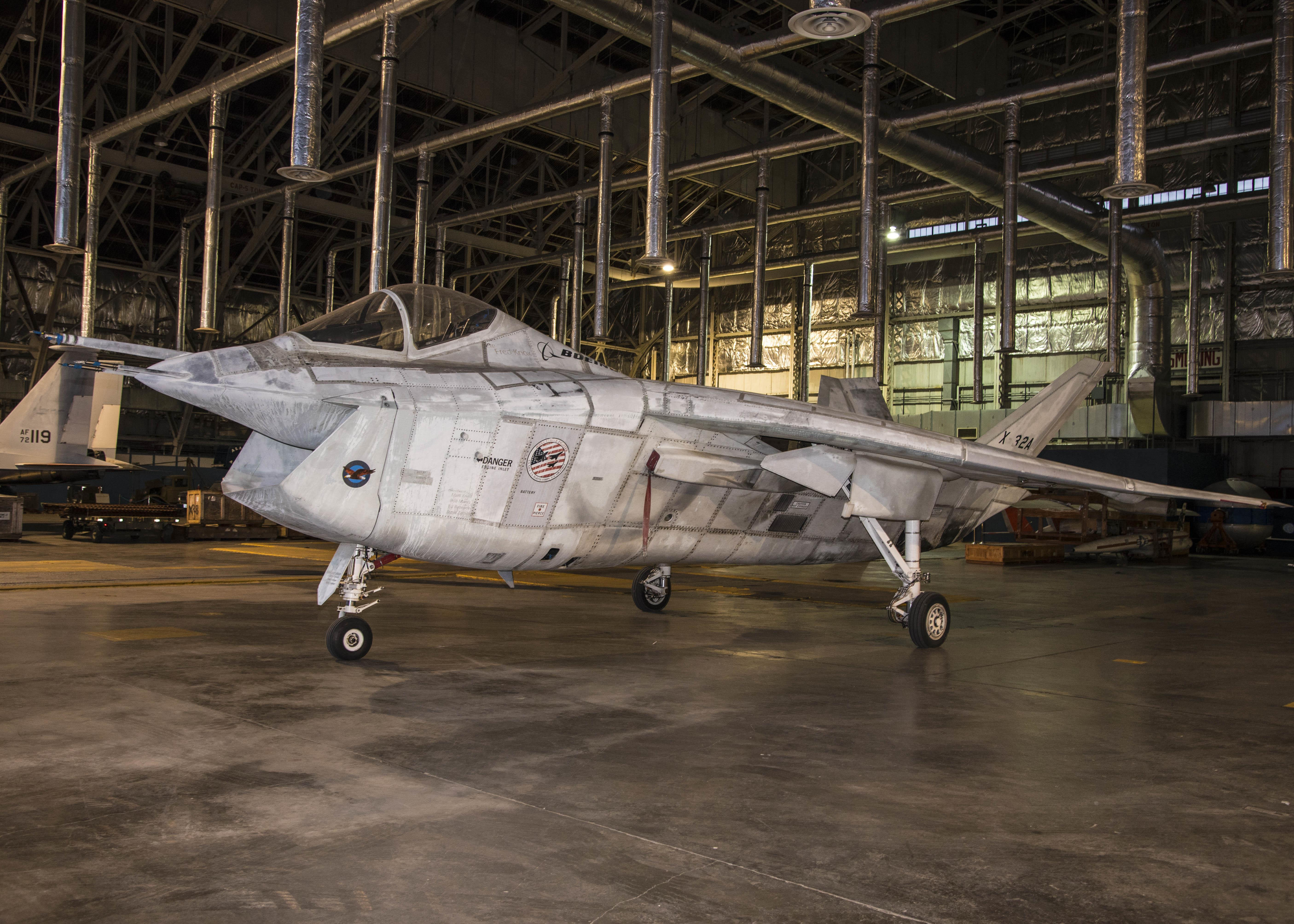
State of the aircraft in 2019 before beginning of complete restoration

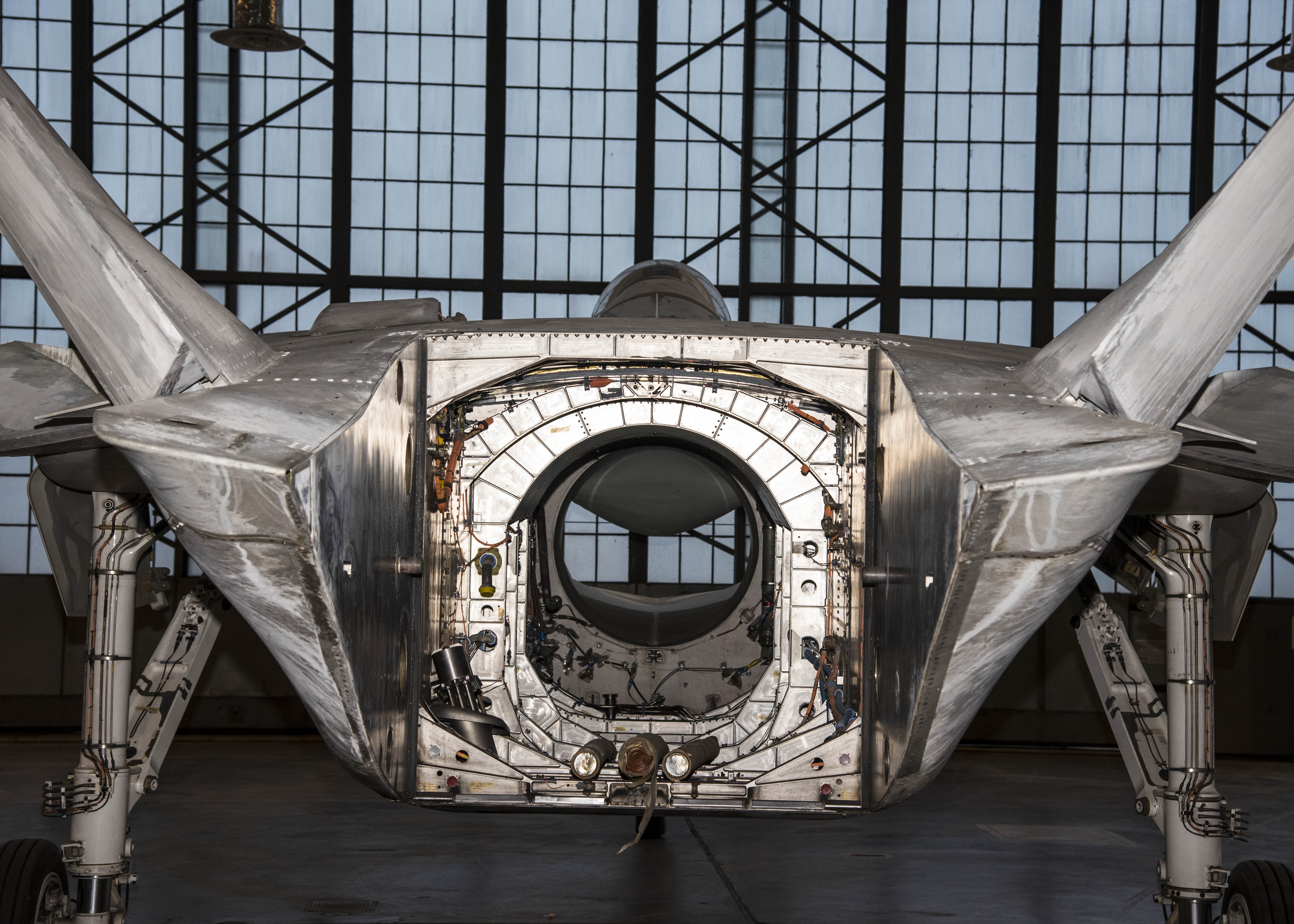
Engine removed

=== X-32A post restoration ===
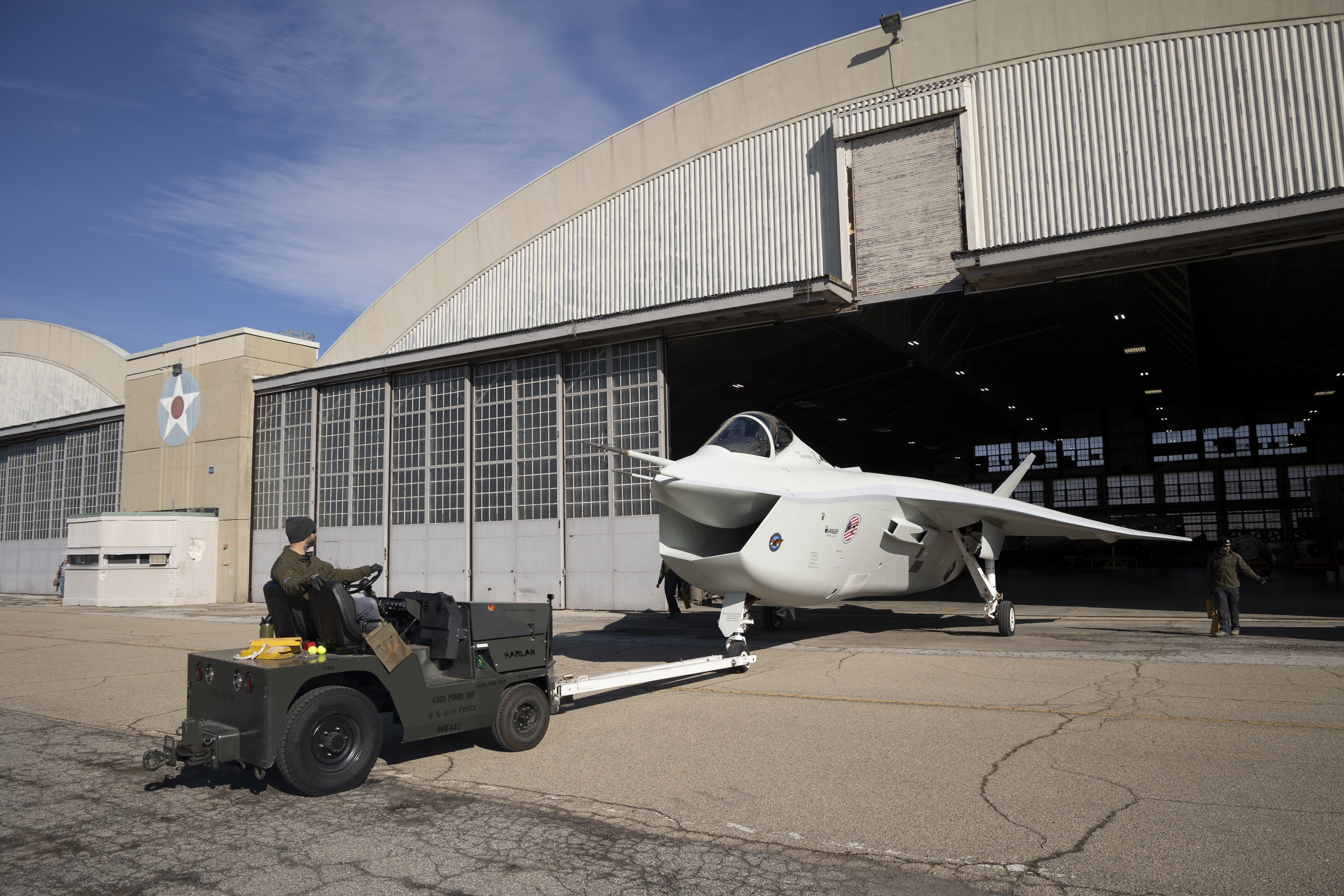
Towing for display

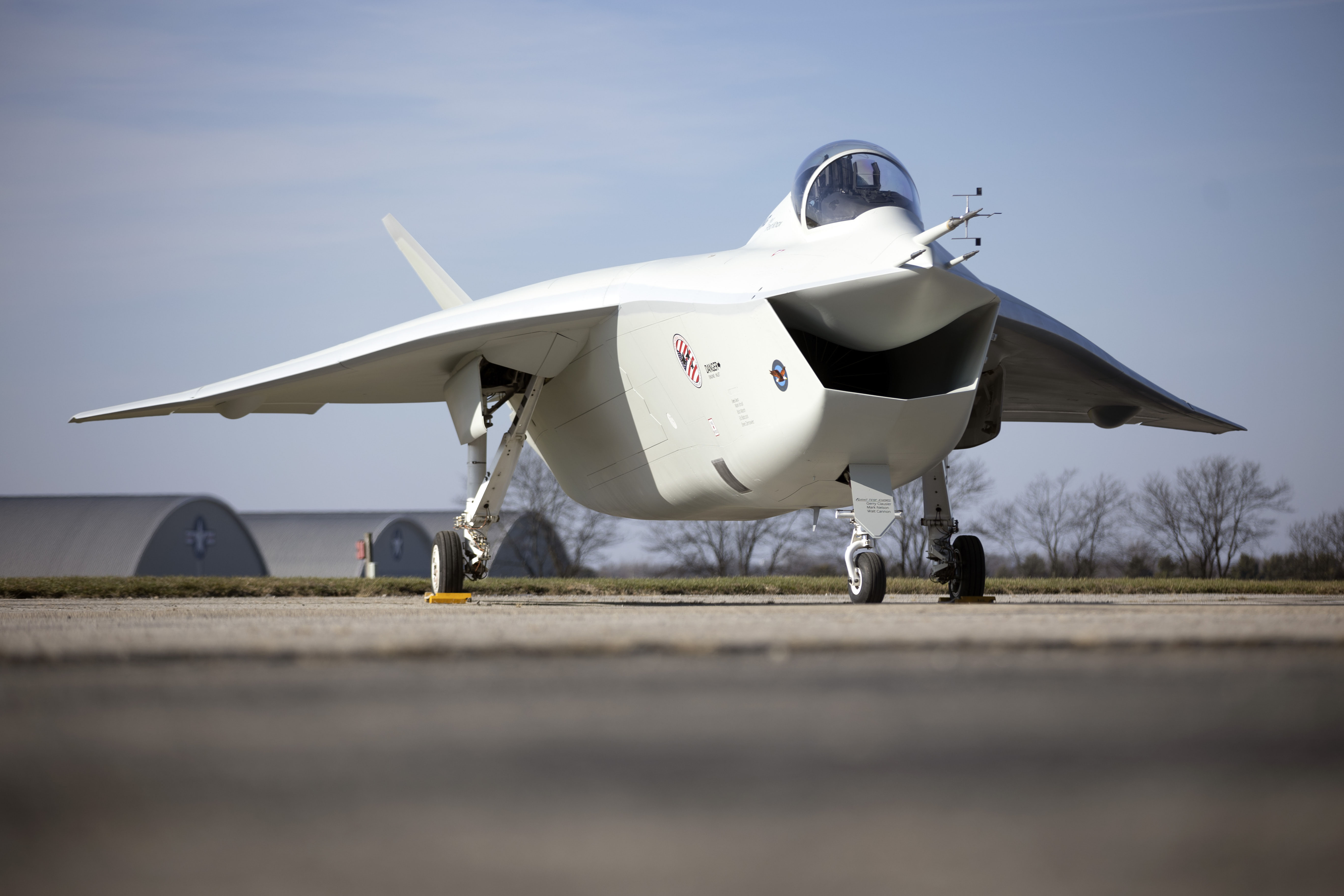

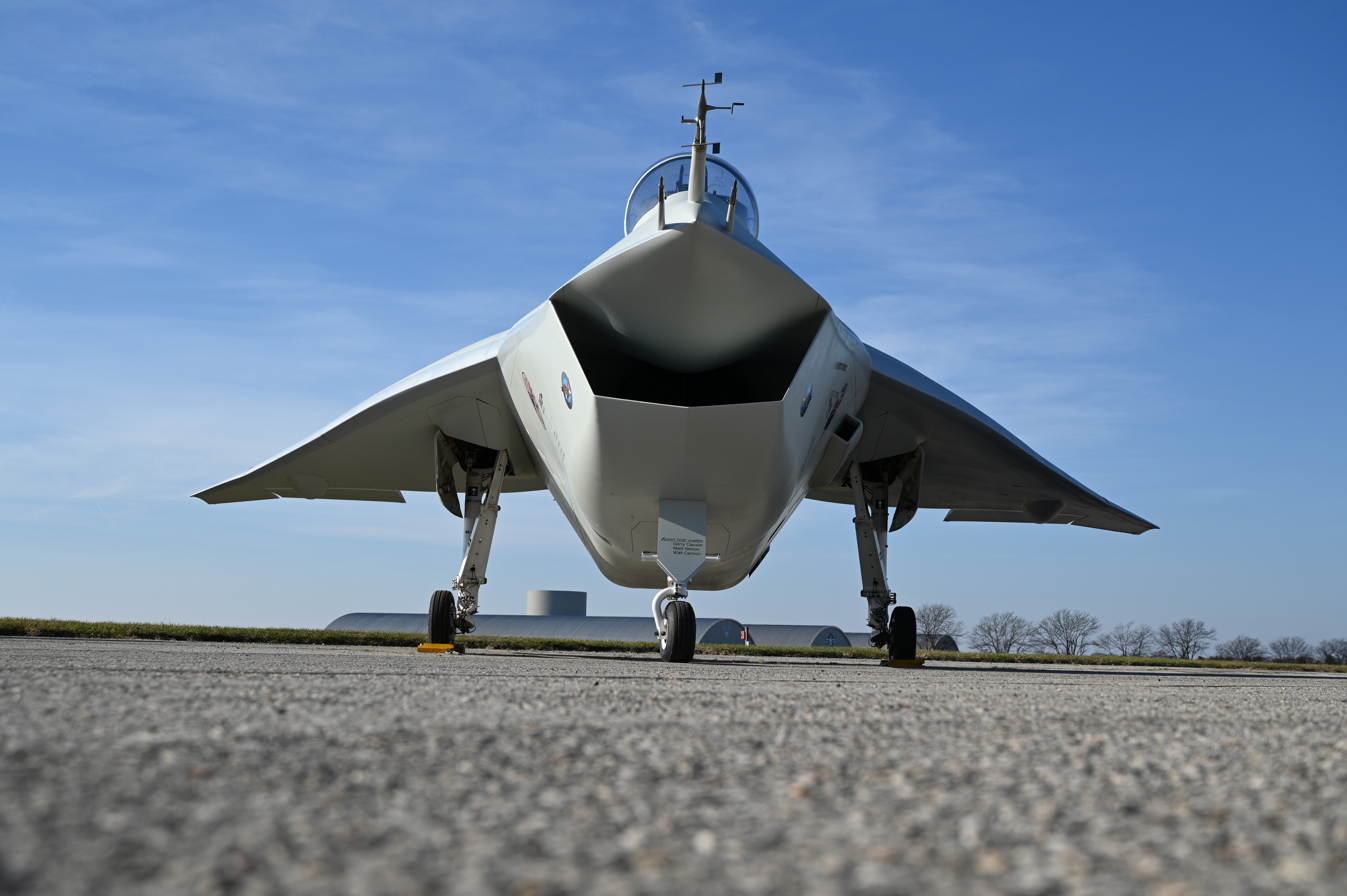

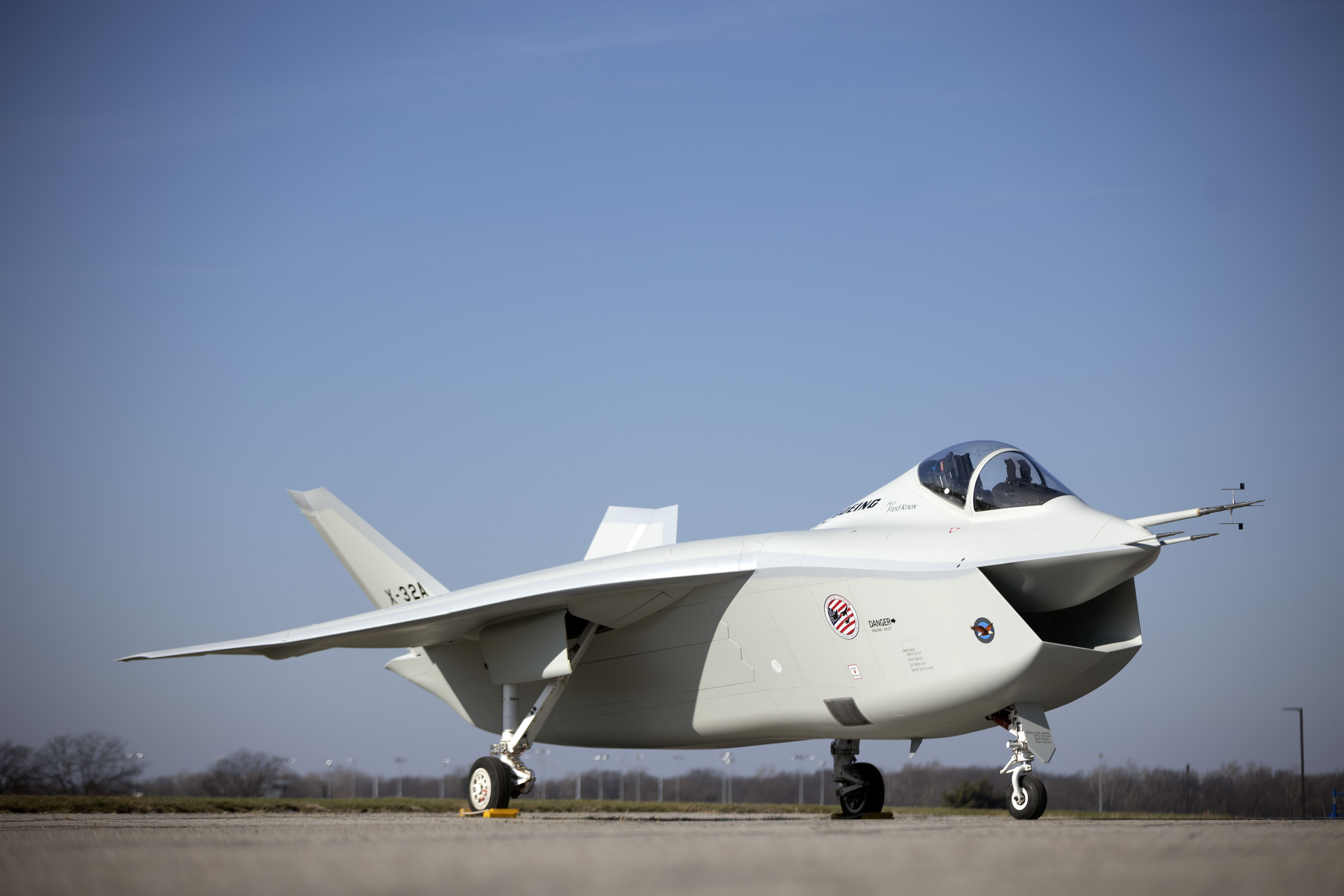

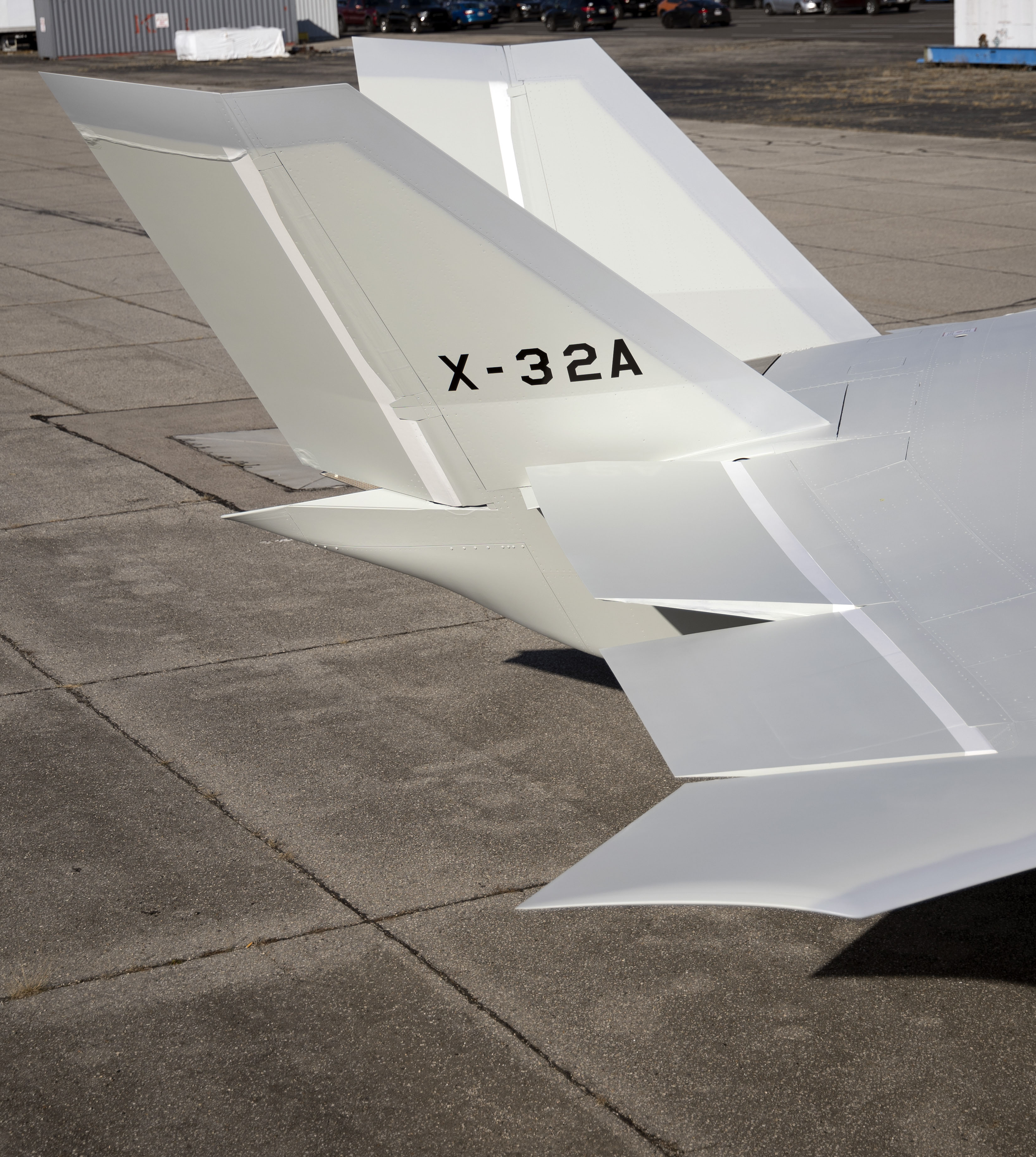

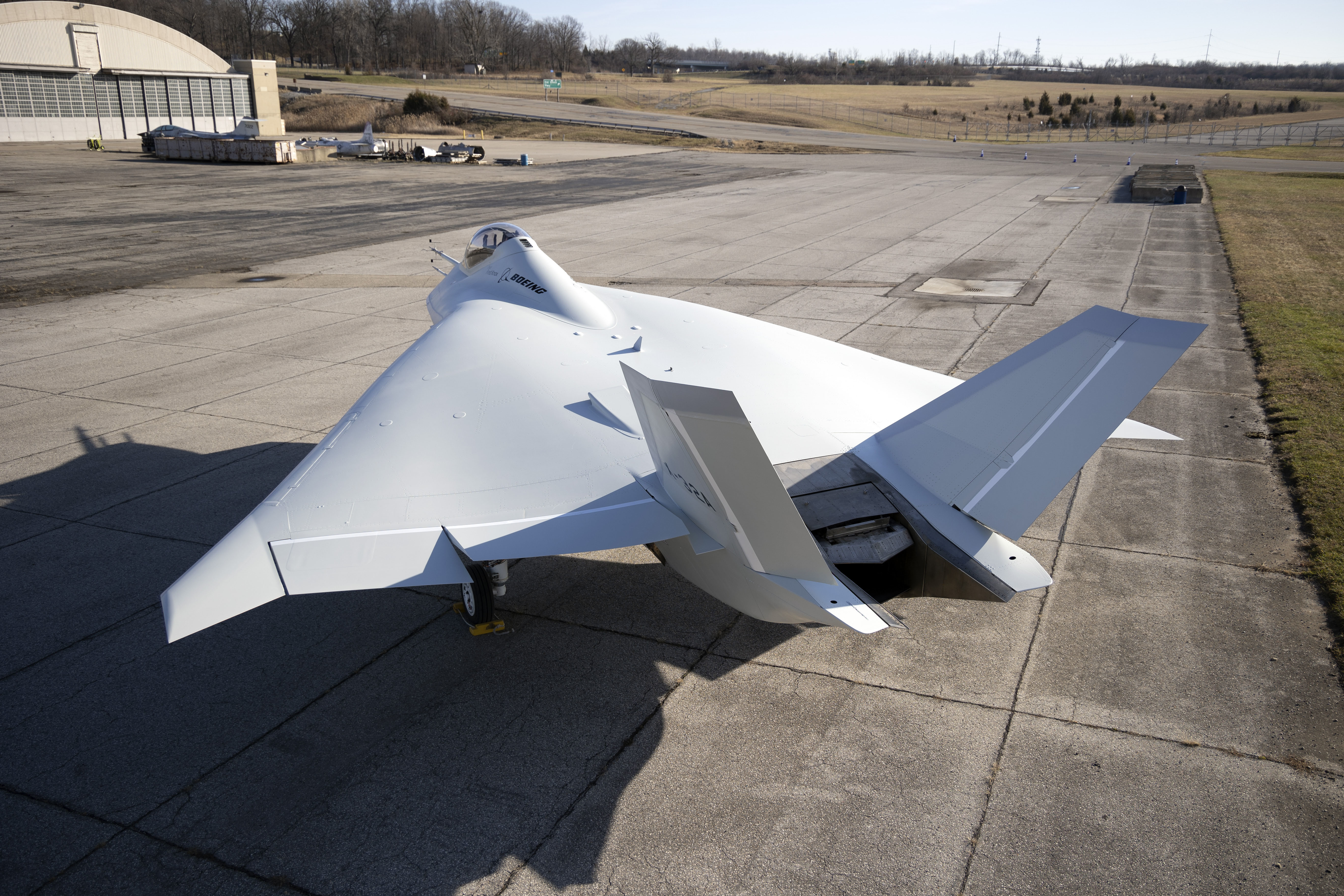

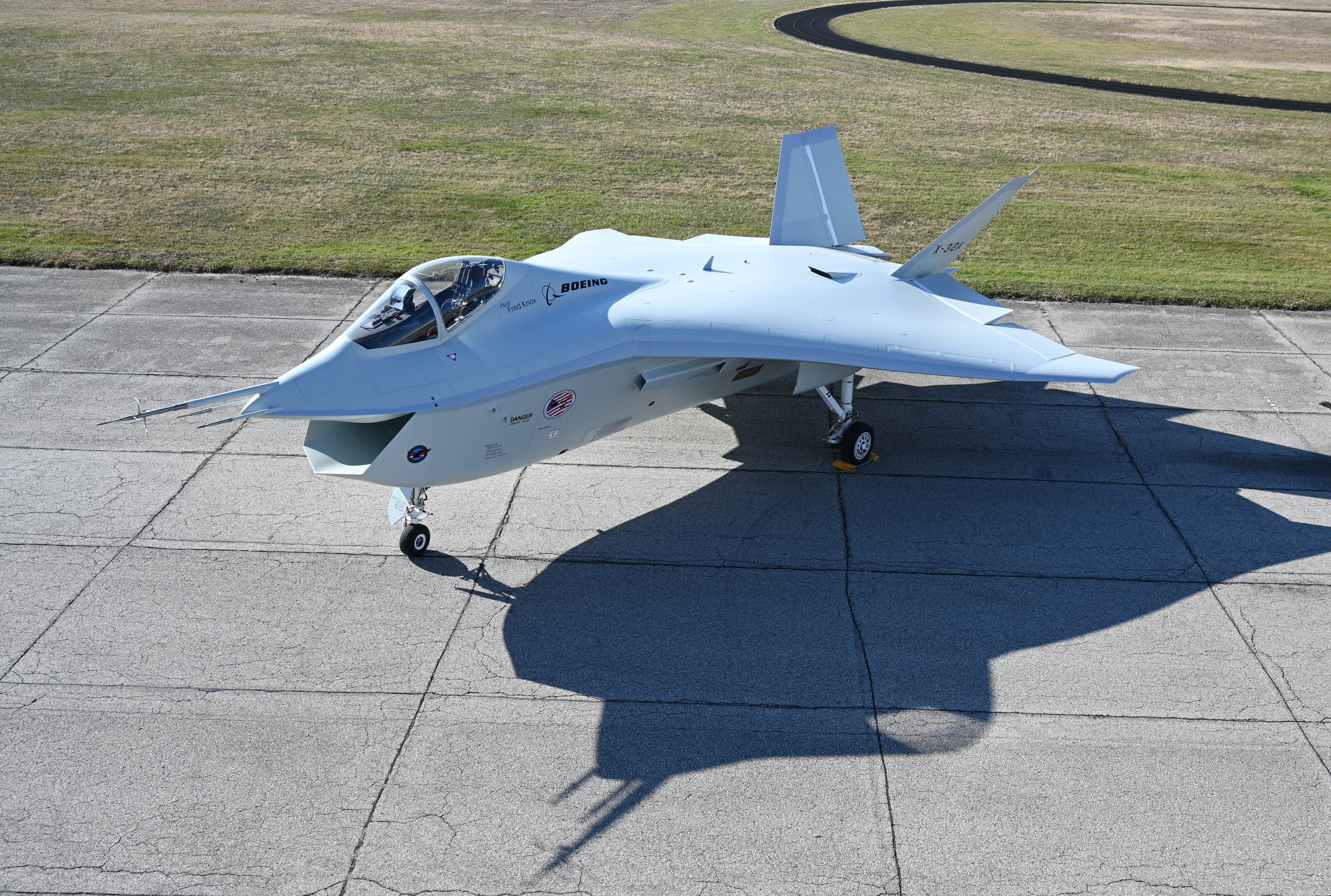

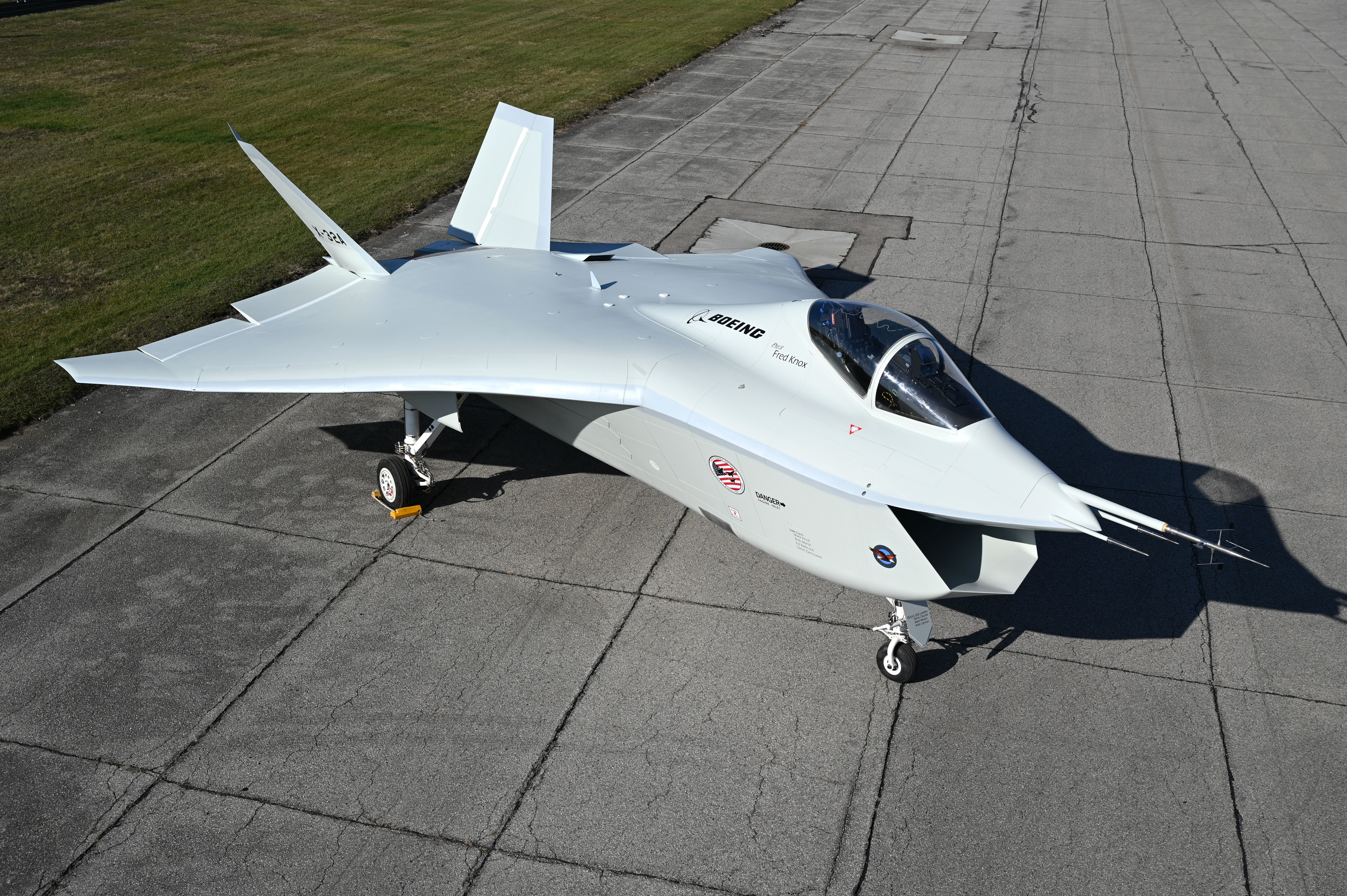

== Specifications ==
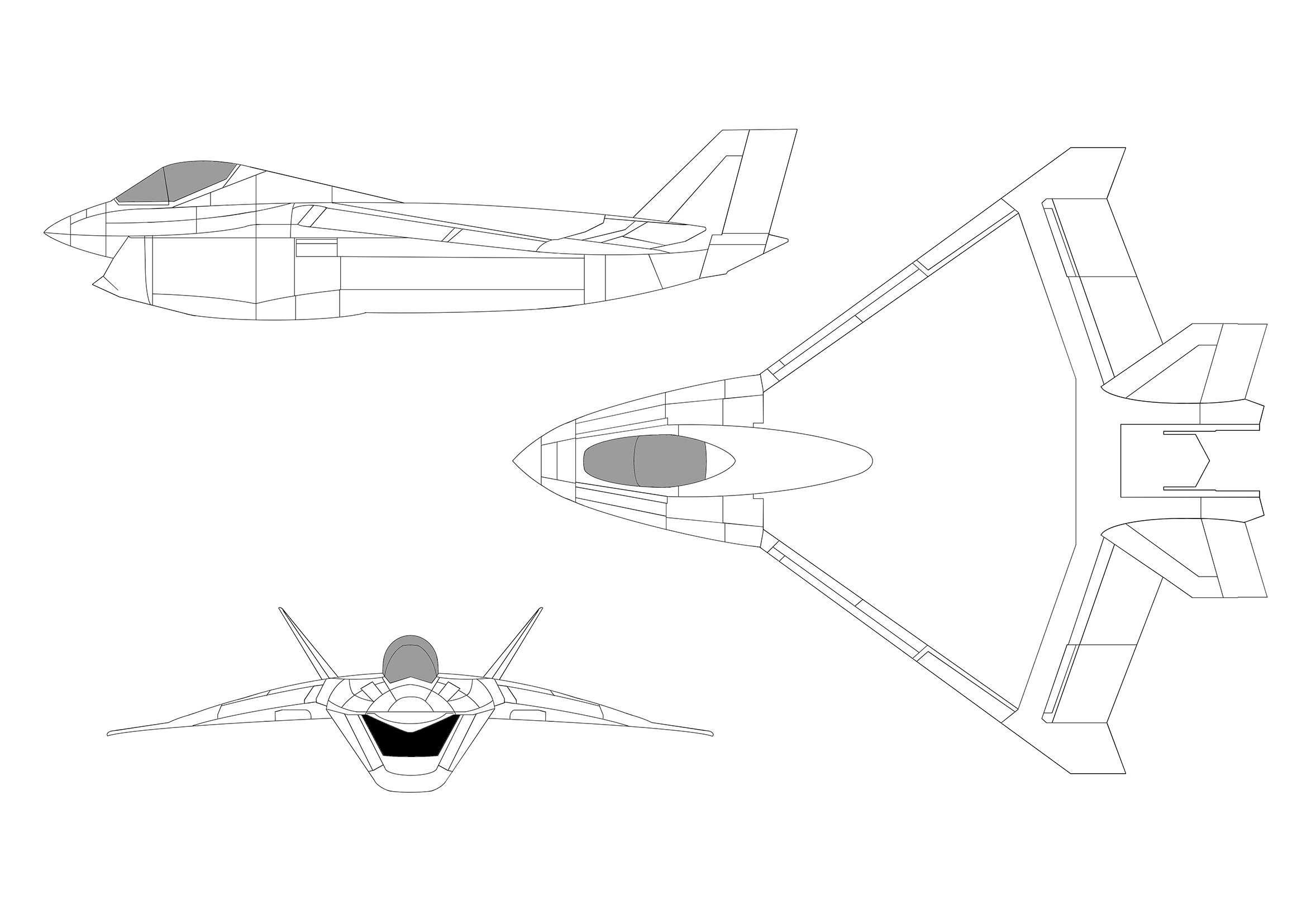
Perspective tables

Data from Frawley

General characteristics

- Crew: 1
- Length: 45 ft 0.1 in (13.72 m)
- Wingspan: 36 ft 0 in (10.97 m)
- Height: 17 ft 3.8 in (5.28 m)
- Wing area: 590 sq ft (54.8 m^{2})
- Empty weight: 24,030 lb (10,900 kg)
- Max takeoff weight: 38,000 lb (17,200 kg)
- Powerplant: 1 × Pratt & Whitney YF119-PW-614 afterburning turbofan, 28,000 lbf (120 kN) thrust dry, 50,000 lbf (220 kN) with afterburner

Performance

- Maximum speed: 1,200 mph (1,931 km/h, 1,000 kn) at altitude
- Maximum speed: Mach 1.2
- Range on USAF mission profile: 850 nmi (1,574 km)
- Range on USN mission profile: 750 nmi (1,389 km)
- Range on USMC/RN mission profile: 600 nmi (1,112 km)

Armament

- 20 mm M61A2 cannon, or 27 mm Mauser BK-27 cannon
- Internal: 6 AMRAAM air-air missiles or 2 AMRAAM air-air missiles and 2 x 2,000 lb (900 kg) class guided bombs
- External: Approx. 15,000 lb (6,800 kg) of full range of external stores including guided weapons, anti-radiation missile, air-to-surface weapons, auxiliary fuel tanks

== See also ==
- Fifth-generation fighter

Aircraft of comparable role, configuration, and era

- British Aerospace P.125
- Sukhoi Su-75 Checkmate
- Yakovlev Yak-141

Related lists

- List of experimental aircraft
