= Patuxent River Naval Air Museum =

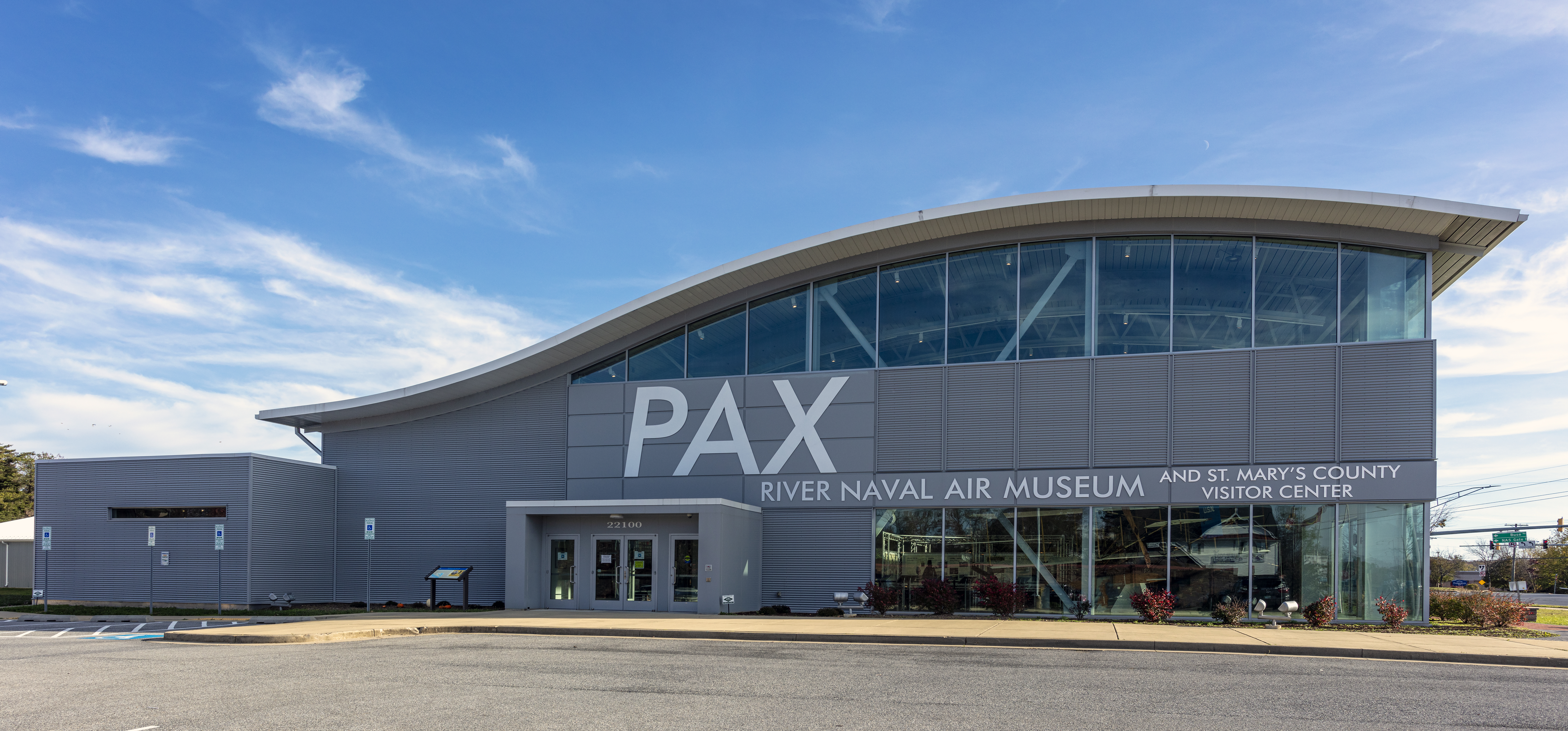

- Location in Maryland Patuxent River Naval Air Museum (the United States)
- Established: 1975
- Location: Lexington Park, Maryland, U.S.
- Coordinates: 38.276225°N 76.4634651°W
- Type: Naval aviation museum
- President: Chad Miller
- Website: paxmuseum.com

The Patuxent River Naval Air Museum is a museum at Lexington Park, Maryland, first opened in 1978, which preserves and interprets the Naval Air Station Patuxent River history and heritage of advancing US naval aviation technology with artifacts, photographs and film, documents, and related heritage memorabilia from Patuxent River and other naval stations. The museum is dedicated to those who have employed their talents in advancing naval aviation research, development, testing, and evaluation.

== History ==
In late 1974, a steering group was formed, which prepared the necessary incorporating papers and bylaws, and introduced legislation to the Maryland General Assembly. On 14 March 1975, the Naval Air Test and Evaluation Museum (NATEM) Association was approved and established as a non-profit, tax exempt organization in the State of Maryland. In 1976, the Navy provided the current building and grounds in Lexington Park, Maryland, and the museum opened its doors to the public in July 1978. In 1978, the Museum was recognized by the Secretary of the Navy as one of the ten official Navy museums. The museum later lost that official designation around 2016, due to federal budget restructuring.

In 2015, the museum acquired a mural that had been on display at the officer’s club of the neighboring naval air station.

On May 28, 2016, the museum opened a new building. In 2018, a new collections management facility was added. A temporary exhibit about anthropometrics opened in January 2025. In April of 2025 it opened a temporary exhibit to celebrate the 80th Anniversary of the Naval Test Pilots School.

== Facilities ==
The museum is composed of three buildings: Test & Evaluation Hall and Flight Technology Hall, which are exhibit galleries and Collections Management Facility, which is used for collections storage.

== Aircraft on display ==
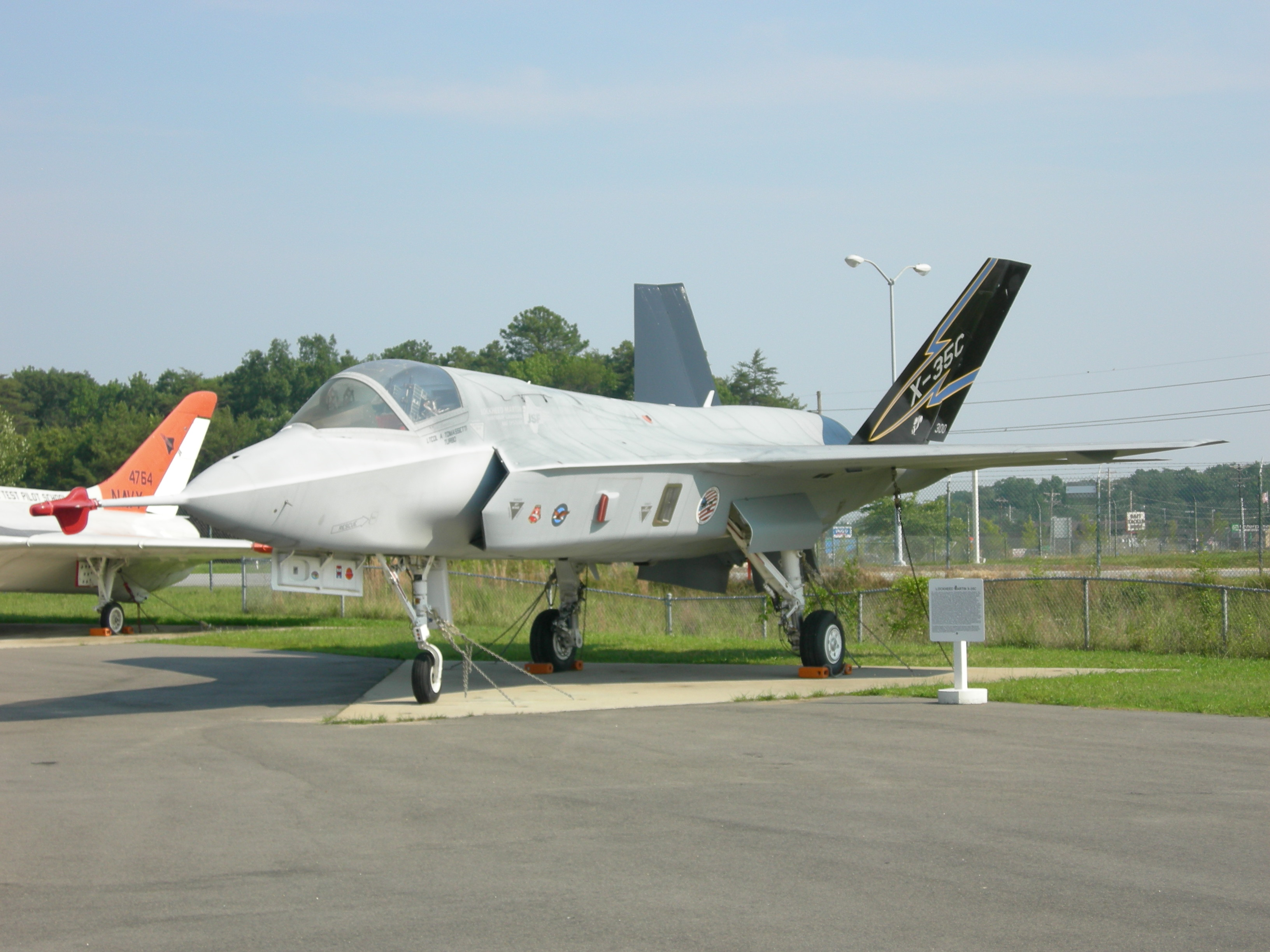
Lockheed Martin X-35C on display

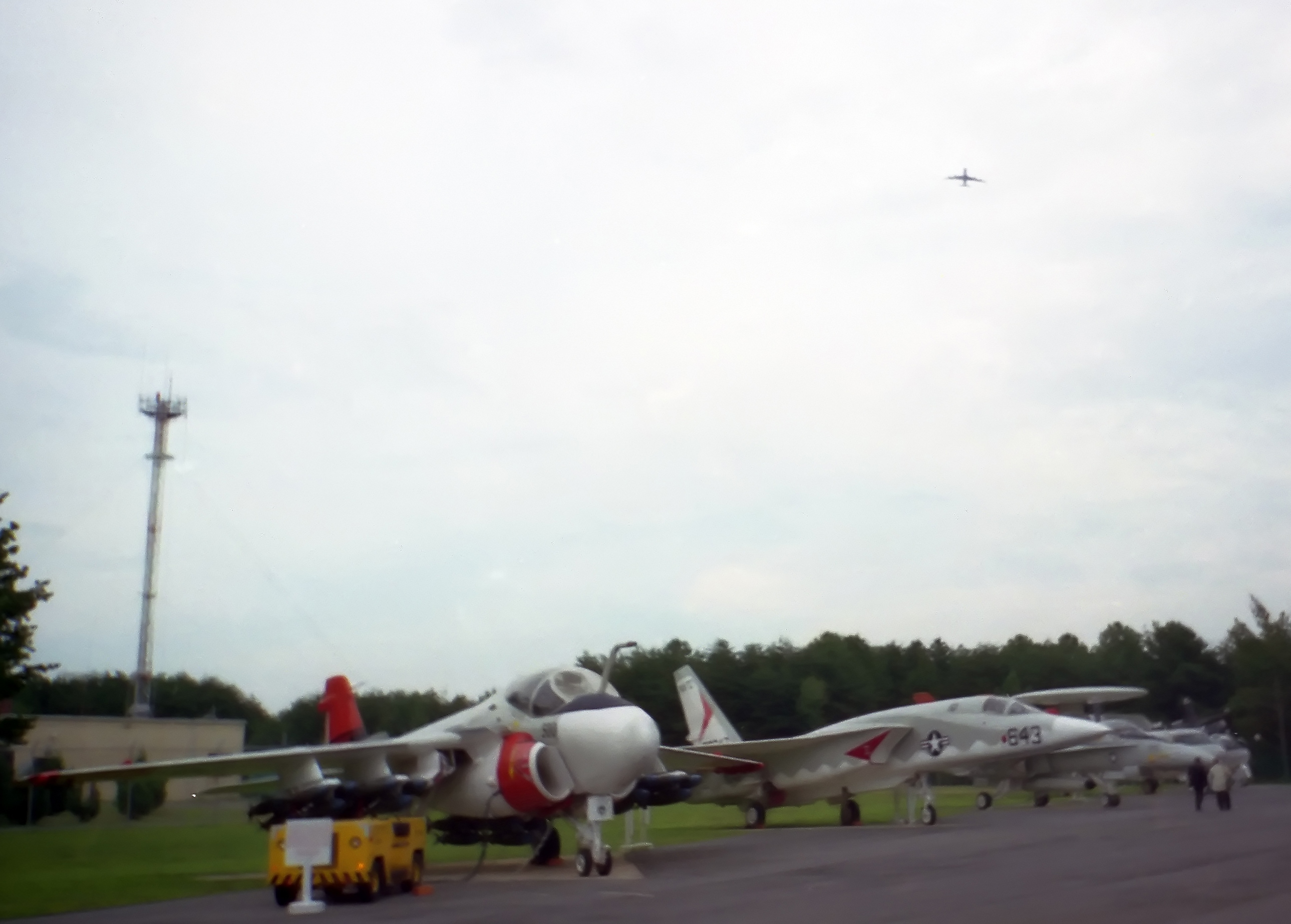
Outdoor display at the museum (2003)

- AAI RQ-2 Pioneer 101
- BAE Systems Silver Fox 103
- Beechcraft PD-373 Texan II N8284M
- Beechcraft T-34B Mentor 140921
- Bell-Boeing MV-22B Osprey 164940
- Bell OH-58C Kiowa (Cockpit)
- Bell TH-1L Iroquois 157842
- Bell TR911X
- Boeing Vertol CH-46E Sea Knight 152578
- Boeing X-32B
- Curtiss A-1 (Replica)
- Douglas NF-6A Skyray 134764
- Grumman C-2A Greyhound 162142
- Grumman E-2B Hawkeye 152476
- Grumman EA-6B Prowler 158033
- Grumman F9F-8B Cougar 144275
- Grumman NF-14D Tomcat 161623
- Grumman NA-6E Intruder 156997
- Grumman S-2D Tracker 149240
- Gyrodyne QH-50D DASH DS-1679
- Honeywell RQ-16B T-Hawk II A11022
- Kaman CQ-24A K-MAX 169221
- Kaman SH-2G Seasprite 161642
- Lockheed KC-130F Hercules (Cockpit) 148892
- Lockheed S-3B Viking 159770
- Lockheed Martin X-35C 300
- LTV NA-7A Corsair II 152658
- McDonnell Douglas AV-8B Harrier II 161576
- McDonnell Douglas AV-8B Harrier II 165580
- McDonnell Douglas EF-4B Phantom II (Cockpit) 153070
- McDonnell Douglas F-4J Phantom II 153071
- McDonnell Douglas F/A-18B Hornet 162885
- McDonnell Douglas NA-4M Skyhawk 155049
- McDonnell Douglas NF/A-18A Hornet 161353
- McDonnell Douglas T-45A Goshawk (Cockpit) 162788
- Mikoyan-Gurevich MiG-21MF (Cockpit) 74 Red
- NASC TigerShark-XP N947TS
- North American RA-5C Vigilante 156643
- North American T-2C Buckeye 158320
- North American NT-39D Sabreliner 150987
- Northrop T-38A Talon 623625
- Northrop Grumman RQ-8A Fire Scout 166414
- Northrop Grumman X-47A Pegasus (Mockup)
- Sikorsky UH-3A Sea King 148038
- Sikorsky NCH-53A Sea Stallion 151686

== See also ==
- List of maritime museums in the United States
- Naval Amphibious Training Base Solomons
