= British Aerospace P.125 =

Type of aircraft

P.125

General information
- Type: VSTOL multirole combat aircraft
- National origin: United Kingdom
- Manufacturer: British Aerospace
- Status: Cancelled
- Primary users: Royal Air Force (Intended) Royal Navy (Intended)
- Number built: None

The British Aerospace P.125 was a British supersonic STOVL multirole combat aircraft being developed in the 1980s. The project was cancelled in the 1990s. The existence of the project was revealed by BAE Systems in 2006.

== Development ==
The British Hawker P.1154 was one of several solutions submitted by European countries to the 1960 NATO NBMR-3 requirement for a supersonic strike fighter. 1960 also saw the first flight of the subsonic VSTOL Hawker P.1127. The P.1154 was cancelled in 1965, but studies continued into the possibility that the Harrier or Jaguar could be replaced by a supersonic STOVL aircraft.

In the 1980s the British MoD and the US DoD both conducted studies into lift jet solutions. The US studies eventually led to the F-35 Lightning II. In 1988 the Tornado-sized P.125 design was intended to meet the requirements for a supersonic stealthy STOVL interdictor. There were to be non-STOVL and STOVL variants of the P.125. Both had a single reheated (afterburning) turbofan with a vectorable rear nozzle. The STOVL variant would have maintained vertical flight using three jet lift nozzles. The pilot of the P.125 would have sat highly reclined and would not have had direct sight of the outside world. In the 1990s the UK government decided to join the JSF (now F-35) programme rather than continue the P.125.

== See also ==
Aircraft of comparable role, configuration, and era

- Boeing X-32
- EWR VJ 101
- Lockheed Martin X-35
- Yakovlev Yak-141
