= Joint Strike Fighter program =

Attack aircraft development program

Joint Strike Fighter (JSF)
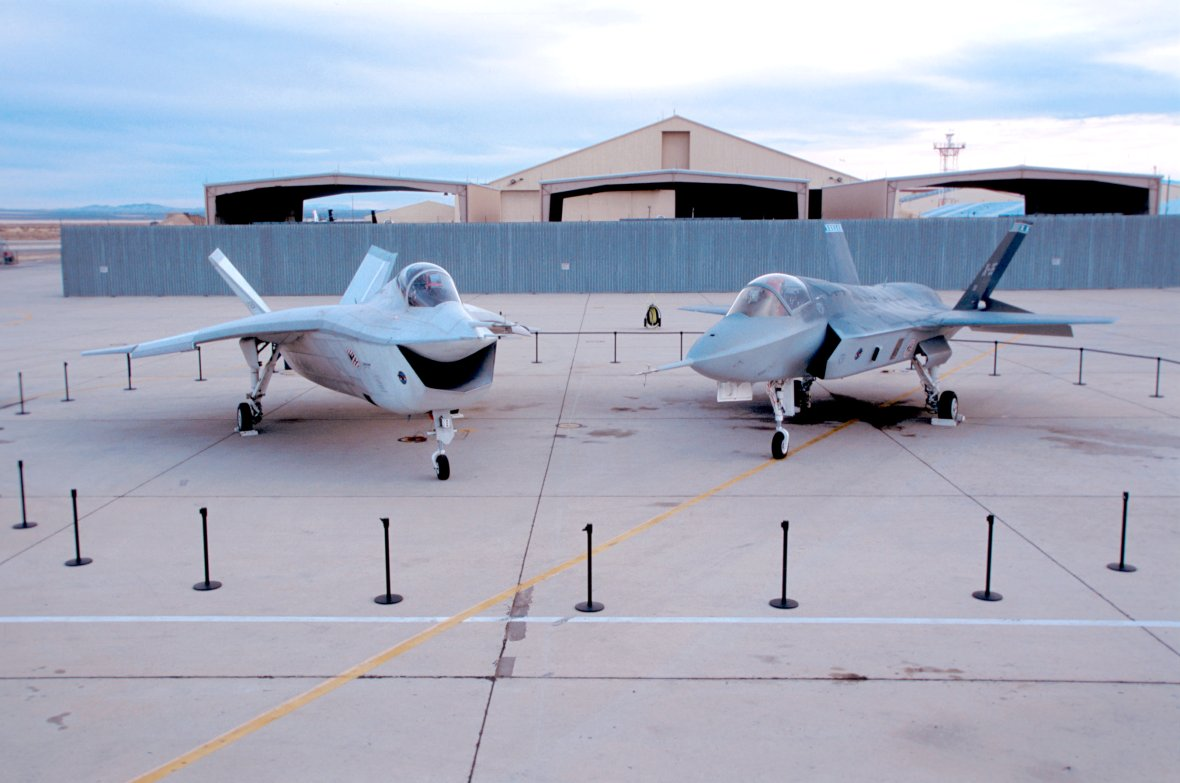
- Boeing X-32 (left) and Lockheed Martin X-35 (right) JSF demonstrators.

General information
- Project for: Strike Fighter
- Issued by: Multiple services
- Prototypes: Boeing X-32; Lockheed Martin X-35

History
- Initiated: 1993
- Concluded: 2088 (projected)
- Outcome: X-35 selected for production as F-35 Lightning II
- Related: F-35I "Adir"
- Predecessors: Common Affordable Lightweight Fighter (CALF); Joint Advanced Strike Technology

Joint Strike Fighter (JSF) is a development and acquisition program that resulted in the Lockheed Martin F-35 Lightning II stealth multirole fighter aircraft. It is intended to replace a wide range of existing fighter, strike, and ground attack aircraft for the United States, the United Kingdom, Italy, Canada, Australia, the Netherlands, Denmark, Norway, and formerly Turkey.

Started in 1993, the program received proposals from McDonnell Douglas, Northrop, Lockheed and Boeing. In 1996, the latter two were selected, developing the Boeing X-32 and the Lockheed Martin X-35 prototypes. The X-35 awarded the contract in 2001, and developed into the F-35, which will replace various tactical aircraft, including the US F-16, A-10, F/A-18A-D, AV-8B, EA-6B and British Harrier GR7, GR9s and Tornado GR4. The projected average annual cost of the program is $12.5 billion in 2012 with an estimated cost in 2024 of $2 trillion over its lifespan. The F-35 first flew in 2006, and was introduced into service from 2015.

== Project formation ==
The JSF program was the result of the merger of the Common Affordable Lightweight Fighter (CALF) and Joint Advanced Strike Technology (JAST) projects. The merged project continued under the JAST name until the engineering, manufacturing and development (EMD) phase, during which the project became the Joint Strike Fighter.

The CALF was a DARPA program to develop a STOVL strike fighter (SSF), originally under the Advanced Short Takeoff and Vertical Landing (ASTOVL) project, for the United States Marine Corps and replacement for the F-16 Fighting Falcon. The United States Air Force passed over the F-16 Agile Falcon in the late 1980s, essentially an enlarged F-16, and continued to mull other designs. In 1992, the Marine Corps and Air Force agreed to jointly develop the Common Affordable Lightweight Fighter, which continued development efforts under ASTOVL. CALF project was chosen after Paul Bevilaqua persuaded the Air Force that his team's concept (if stripped of its lift system) had potential as a complement to the F-22 Raptor.

The Joint Advanced Strike Technology (JAST) program was created in 1993, implementing one of the recommendations of a United States Department of Defense (DoD) "Bottom-Up Review to include the United States Navy in the Common Strike Fighter program." The review also led the Pentagon to continue the F-22 Raptor and F/A-18E/F Super Hornet programs, cancel the Air Force's Multi-Role Fighter (MRF) and the Navy's Advanced Attack/Fighter (A/F-X) programs, and curtail F-16 and F/A-18C/D procurement. The JAST program office was established on 27 January 1994 to develop aircraft, weapons, and sensor technology with the aim of replacing several disparate US and UK aircraft with a single family of aircraft; the majority of those produced would replace F-16s. Merrill McPeak, former Chief of Staff of the United States Air Force, has complained that Defense Secretary Les Aspin's decision to force all three services to use a single airframe greatly increased the costs and difficulty of the project.

In November 1995, the United Kingdom signed a memorandum of understanding to become a formal partner, and agreed to pay $200 million, or 10% of the concept demonstration phase.

In 1997, Canada's Department of National Defence signed on to the Concept Demonstration phase with an investment of US$10 million. This investment allowed Canada to participate in the extensive and rigorous competitive process where Boeing and Lockheed Martin developed and competed their prototype aircraft.

== JSF competition ==
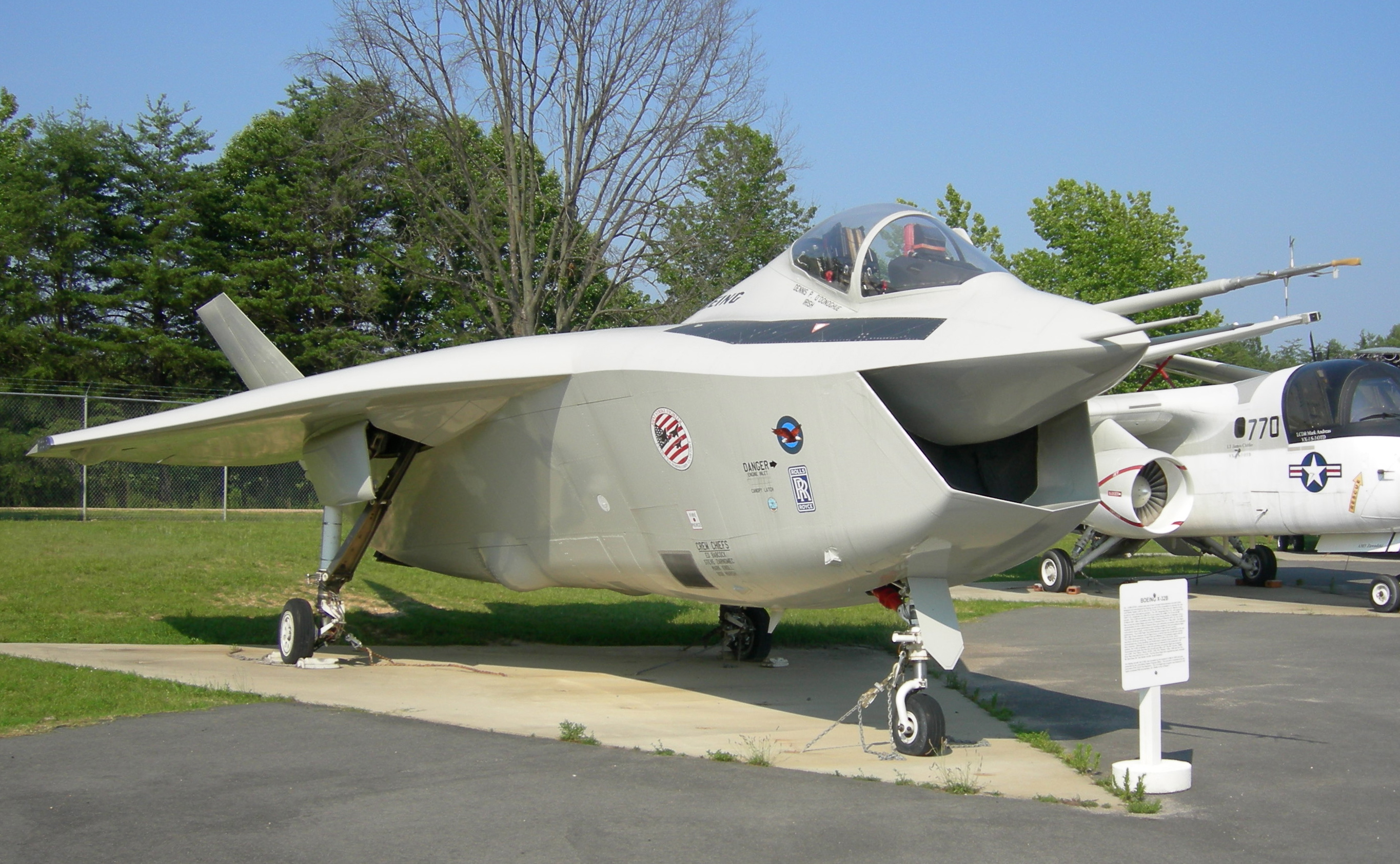
X-32B at Patuxent River Naval Air Museum

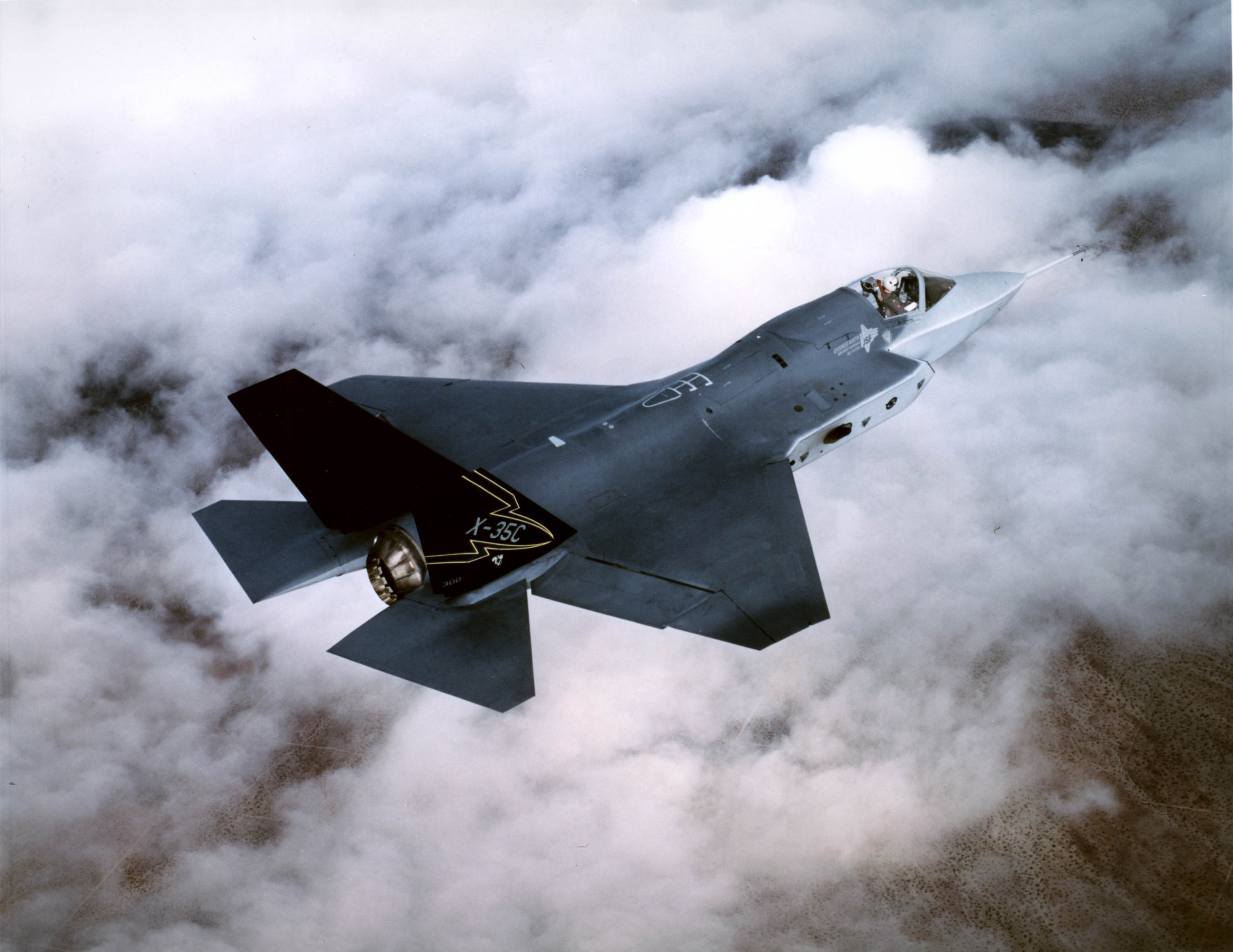
X-35C performing a flight test at Edwards Air Force Base

Studies supporting JAST/JSF started in 1993 and led to STOVL submissions to the DOD by McDonnell Douglas, Northrop, Lockheed and Boeing:

1. McDonnell Douglas proposed an aircraft powered by a reheated turbofan, with a remote gas-driven fan to augment lift in the STOVL mode. This configuration was called Gas-Driven Lift Fan (GDLF). Later, General Electric did a ground demonstration of this engine configuration.
2. The Northrop aircraft featured an auxiliary lift engine augmenting the dry thrust from a reheated turbofan fitted with a pair of thrust-vectoring nozzles. This configuration was called Lift-Plus-Lift/Cruise (LPLC).
3. The Lockheed aircraft concept used a reheated turbofan with thrust augmentation from a remote shaft-driven lift fan. This engine configuration was called Shaft-Driven Lift Fan (SDLF) and eventually led to the YF119-PW-611 which powered the X-35B JSF demonstrator.
4. Boeing decided against thrust augmentation. They proposed an aircraft powered by a reheated turbofan that could be reconfigured (in the STOVL mode) into a direct lift engine with a pair of thrust-vectoring nozzles located near the aircraft center-of-gravity. This led to the YF119-PW-614S which powered the X-32B JSF demonstrator.

Two contracts to develop prototypes were awarded on November 16, 1996, one each to Lockheed Martin and Boeing. Each firm would produce two aircraft to demonstrate conventional takeoff and landing (CTOL), carrier takeoff and landing (CV version), and short takeoff and vertical landing (STOVL). McDonnell Douglas' bid was rejected in part due to the complexity of its design. Lockheed Martin and Boeing were each given $750 million to develop their concept demonstrators and the definition of the Preferred Weapon System Concept (PWSC). The aim of this funding limit was to prevent one or both contractors from bankrupting themselves in an effort to win such an important contract.

Also in 1996, the UK Ministry of Defence launched the Future Carrier Borne Aircraft project. This program sought a replacement for the Sea Harrier (and later the Harrier GR7); the Joint Strike Fighter was selected in January 2001.

During concept definition, two Lockheed Martin airplanes were flight-tested: the X-35A (which was later converted into the X-35B), and the larger-winged X-35C. Arguably the most persuasive demonstration of the X-35's capability was the final qualifying Joint Strike Fighter flight trials, in which the X-35B STOVL aircraft took off in less than 500 feet (150 m), went supersonic, and landed vertically – a feat that Boeing's entry was unable to achieve.

=== Outcome ===
The contract for System Development and Demonstration (SDD) was awarded on 26 October 2001 to Lockheed Martin, whose X-35 beat the Boeing X-32. One of the main reasons for this choice appears to have been the method of achieving STOVL flight, with the Department of Defense judging that the higher performance lift fan system was worth the extra risk. When near to the ground, the Boeing X-32 suffered from the problem of hot air from the exhaust circulating back to the main engine, which caused the thrust to weaken and the engine to overheat.

The United States Department of Defense officials and William Bach, the UK Minister of Defence Procurement, said the X-35 consistently outperformed the X-32, although both met or exceeded requirements. The development of the JSF was jointly funded by the United States, United Kingdom, Italy, the Netherlands, Canada, Turkey, Australia, Norway and Denmark. In July 2019 United States removed Turkey from the Joint Strike Fighter program, following the country's acquisition of the Russian S-400 missile system. Turkey had planned to buy 100 F-35 Lightning II jets.

Lockheed Martin's X-35 would become the basis of the F-35 Lightning II, currently in production and service; Pratt & Whitney's YF119-PW-611 would be the basis for the F135-PW-600 on the production F-35B. On April 6, 2009, US Secretary of Defense Robert Gates announced that the US would buy a total of 2,443 JSFs.

== Program issues ==
=== Alleged Chinese espionage ===
In April 2009, the Wall Street Journal reported that computer spies, allegedly Chinese but acknowledged to be from uncertain sources, had penetrated the database and acquired terabytes of secret information about the fighter, possibly compromising its future effectiveness.

The state-run Aviation Industry Corporation of China (AVIC) has been alleged to incorporate the data into China's Chengdu J-20 and Shenyang FC-31 fighters.

=== Cost overruns ===
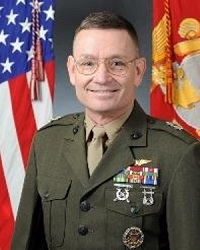
Major General David R. Heinz, USMC

On February 1, 2010, Secretary of Defense Robert M. Gates announced that, due to delays and other problems with the JSF development program, he was removing Major General David R. Heinz from command of the program and would withhold $614 million in bonuses from Lockheed Martin. On February 16, 2010, Deputy Defense Secretary Bill Lynn announced that the program will be delayed one year. According to some estimates, overruns could increase the program's total costs to $388 billion, a 50% increase from the initial price tag. Many of the program's financial and technical complications result from the Marine version of the JSF, capable of vertical take-offs and landings.

Heinz was to be replaced by a three-star officer, reflecting the importance of the programme.

On 11 March 2010, United States Senate Committee on Armed Services investigated the progress of the JSF program in a meeting with Pentagon officials, emphasizing cost due to the risk of a Nunn-McCurdy breach (major cost overrun). According to the Government Accountability Office, F-35A cost has risen from $50m in 2002, via $69m in 2007 to $74m in 2010, all measured in 2002 dollars.

Canada reviewed their commitment to the project in December 2012, due to the cost overruns. The decision was made following a report by auditing firm KPMG that showed that Canada's purchase would cost C$45bn over 42 years. Rona Ambrose, Canada's public works minister said: “We have hit the reset button and are taking the time to do a complete assessment of all available aircraft.” Defence Minister Peter MacKay announced Canada's plan to buy the F-35 in 2010 saying that the purchase price was $9 billion, but did not provide operating cost estimates. During an election campaign in 2011, the Conservatives declared that the total cost over 20 years would be $16 billion. On 19 October 2015 the Liberal Party of Canada under Justin Trudeau won a majority in part on a campaign promise to not purchase the F-35, but instead "one of the many, lower-priced options that better match Canada's defence needs".

=== Performance concerns ===
Concerns about the F-35's performance have resulted partially from reports of simulations by RAND Corporation in which three regiments of Chinese Sukhoi Su-27 fighters defeat six F-22s by denying tanker refueling.

As a result of these media reports, then Australian defence minister Joel Fitzgibbon requested a formal briefing from the Australian Department of Defence on the simulation. This briefing stated that the reports of the simulation were inaccurate and that it did not compare the F-35's performance against that of other aircraft.

Andrew Hoehn, Director of RAND Project Air Force, made the following statement: "Recently, articles have appeared in the Australian press with assertions regarding a war game in which analysts from the RAND Corporation were involved. Those reports are not accurate. RAND did not present any analysis at the war game relating to the performance of the F-35 Joint Strike Fighter, nor did the game attempt detailed adjudication of air-to-air combat. Neither the game nor the assessments by RAND in support of the game undertook any comparison of the fighting qualities of particular fighter aircraft."

Furthermore, Maj. Richard Koch, chief of USAF Air Combat Command's advanced air dominance branch is reported to have said that "I wake up in a cold sweat at the thought of the F-35 going in with only two air-dominance weapons" with an Aviation Week article casting an extremely skeptical eye over the (USAF) source of claims that the F-35 would be "400% more effective" than projected opponents.

The experience of the JSF program has led to a more conservative and open-ended Future Vertical Lift program.

== See also ==
- Advanced Tactical Fighter
- Joint Combat Aircraft
- Joint Unmanned Combat Air Systems
- Fifth-generation fighter
