= Common Affordable Lightweight Fighter =

Joint aircraft program with the U.S. Air Force, Marine Corps, and Royal Navy

Common Affordable Lightweight Fighter (CALF)

General information
- Project for: Lightweight Strike Fighter
- Issued by: Multiple services

History
- Initiated: 1993
- Concluded: 1994
- Outcome: Merged with the Joint Advanced Strike Technology (JAST) program under the JAST name
- Predecessors: Advanced Short Takeoff and Vertical Landing (ASTOVL)
- Successors: JAST/Joint Strike Fighter

The Common Affordable Lightweight Fighter (CALF) was a joint Defense Advanced Research Projects Agency (DARPA) and United States Marine Corps (managed by the Naval Air Systems Command) project that ran from 1993 to 1994. Its aims were to harmonize requirements for a common aircraft that would meet the VSTOL or STOVL needs of the United States Marine Corps and the Royal Navy, while at the same time providing a common low-cost, low-maintenance fighter platform for the United States Air Force, Marine Corps, and foreign customers. The program was a continuation of the DARPA Advanced Short Takeoff and Vertical Landing (ASTOVL) program and created at the suggestion of Lockheed with participation from McDonnell Douglas and Northrop, and was to be conducted in three phases that would culminate in the flight test demonstration of the preferred STOVL concept.

Because CALF appeared to align with the Joint Advanced Strike Technology (JAST) program charter, which aimed to develop and mature strike warfare technology for multiple services, it was merged with JAST after a year of technology validation; JAST, which would serve the United States Air Force, Marine Corps, and Navy, became the Joint Strike Fighter in 1995, which resulted in the Lockheed Martin F-35 Lightning II.

== See also ==
- Joint Strike Fighter
