= General Electric YF120 =

American variable-cycle turbofan engine

YF120
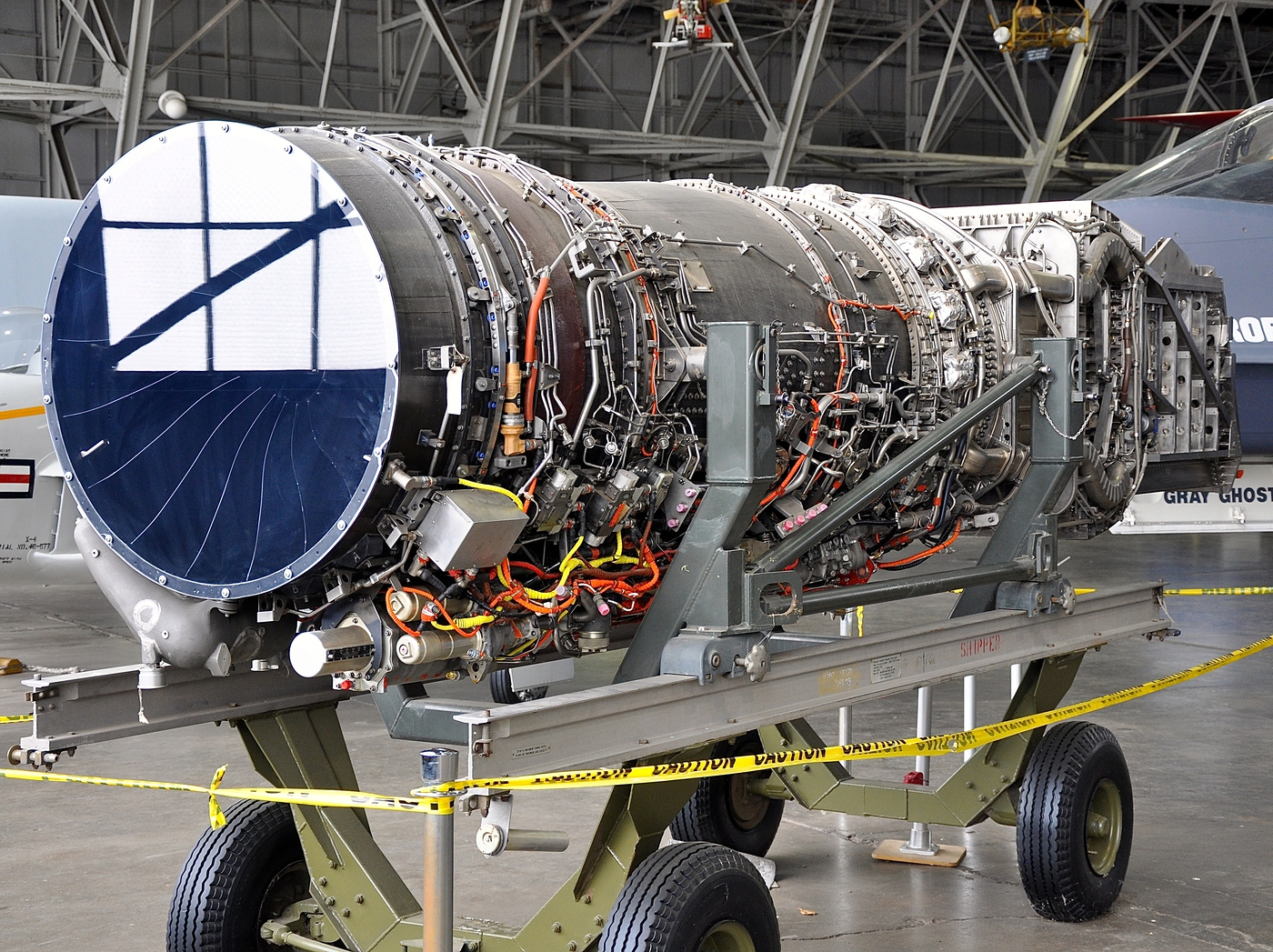
- YF120 at the National Museum of the U.S. Air Force
- Type: Variable-cycle turbofan
- National origin: United States
- Manufacturer: General Electric
- First run: 1980s
- Major applications: Lockheed YF-22; Northrop YF-23
- Developed into: General Electric/Rolls-Royce F136

The General Electric YF120, internally designated as GE37, is a variable-cycle afterburning turbofan engine designed by General Electric Aircraft Engines in the late 1980s and early 1990s for the United States Air Force's Advanced Tactical Fighter (ATF) program. It was designed to produce maximum thrust in the 35,000 lbf (156 kN) class. Prototype engines were installed in the two competing technology demonstrator aircraft, the Lockheed YF-22 and Northrop YF-23.

While the F120 design more ambitious due to its variable cycle architecture, the Pratt & Whitney's competing F119 was deemed less expensive and risky, and was selected over the F120 to power the ATF, the competition for which the Lockheed team won and became F-22 Raptor.

== History ==
=== Development ===
General Electric (GE) began developing the GE37, which would become basis of the XF120 and YF120, for the Joint Advanced Fighter Engine (JAFE) program in the early 1980s aimed at supplying the powerplant for the Air Force's Advanced Tactical Fighter (ATF) and the Navy's Advanced Carrier-Based Multirole Fighter (VFMX); JAFE was later renamed the ATF Engine (ATFE) following VFMX's cancellation. The core technology used in the F120 design was developed during two industry-government programs, the Advanced Technology Engine Gas Generator (ATEGG) and Joint Technology Demonstration Engine (JTDE) programs. The design was meant to address the challenging supercruise requirement of the ATF. This meant the engine had to produce a large amount of dry thrust (without afterburner) and therefore have high off-design efficiency ("design" being standard cruise conditions). Unlike competitor Pratt & Whitney, GE elected against developing a conventional fixed-bypass turbofan and instead chose to design a variable cycle engine. Additional innovations include the use of one-piece disk and rotor blade assemblies, or "blisks", in the fan and compressor stages to increase performance and durability as well as reduce weight and parts count. The original RFP called for maximum thrust in the 30,000 lbf (133 kN) class.

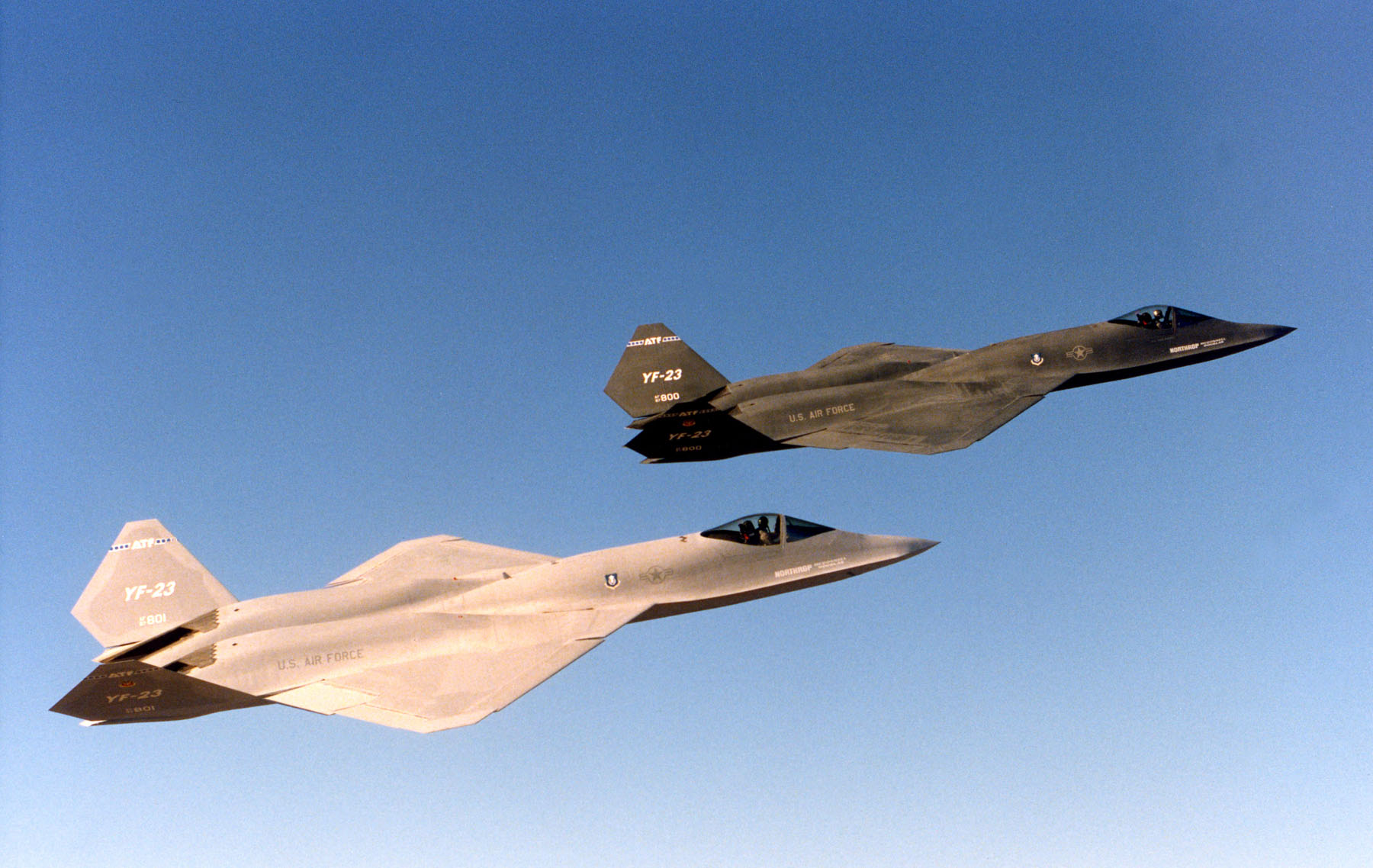
The second YF-23 (left), nicknamed “Spider”, was powered by two YF120 engines.

The ATF Demonstration and Validation (Dem/Val) phase would require flying technology demonstrator prototypes with prototype engines installed for demonstrating concept viability and risk reduction. Due to the ATF's increasing weight during development from 50,000 lb (22,700 kg) to 60,000 lb (27,200 kg), thrust requirement was increased by 20% to over 23,500 lbf (105 kN) in military/intermediate power and 35,000 lbf (156 kN) class in full afterburner in order to meet performance requirements. GE's design changed to incorporate a 12% larger fan to increase airflow as well as cooling air, particularly for the nozzles. For flight demonstration, YF120s were fitted with the larger fan, unlike the YF119 which used its original small fan. As a result, both demonstrator aircraft had higher performance with the YF120s than with the YF119s. The YF120 powered the YF-22 and YF-23 to supercruise speeds of Mach 1.58 and Mach 1.72, respectively. (Note: The YF-23 with the General Electric engines was officially stated to have been able to supercruise at over Mach 1.6, and estimates from General Electric engineers suggest that the top supercruise speed was as high as Mach 1.8.)

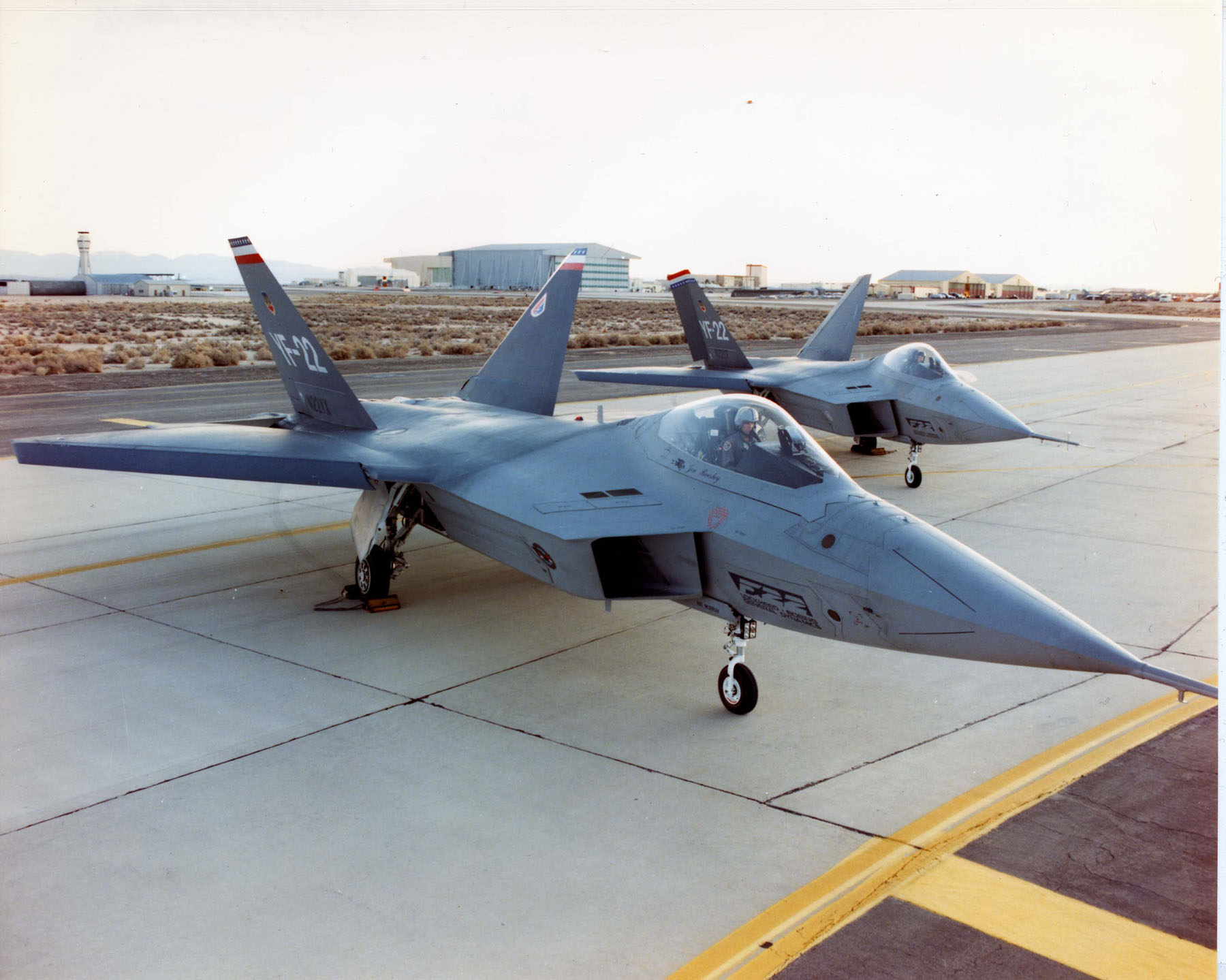
The first YF-22 (right), registration number N22YF, was powered by two YF120 engines.

The Engineering & Manufacturing Development (EMD) configuration of the F120 was tested in December 1990. Component improvements enabled it to achieve YF120 thrust levels at lower temperatures. The USAF ultimately chose the Pratt & Whitney's F119 proposal for full-scale development and production. The more ambitious F120 design was judged to be riskier, and General Electric also accrued fewer testing hours than Pratt & Whitney.

=== Further developments ===
The YF120 was also proposed as the basis for a more exotic engine, the Turbine-Based Combined Cycle (TBCC) engine that was to be used in demonstrator aircraft like the X-43B and future hypersonic aircraft. Specifically, the YF120 was to be the basis for the Revolutionary Turbine Accelerator (RTA-1). The variable cycle technology used in the YF120 would be extended to not only turn the engine into a turbojet but also into a ramjet. In that mode all airflow would bypass the core and be diverted into the afterburner-like "hyperburner" where it would be combusted like a ramjet. This proposed engine was to accelerate from 0 to Mach 4.1 (at 56,000 ft) in eight minutes.

Technology from the YF120 has been applied to subsequent GE designs; in the 1990s, GE, Allison Engine Company, and Rolls-Royce (Allison was acquired by Rolls-Royce in 1995) began jointly developing the F136 engine, initially called the "YF120-FX", for the Joint Strike Fighter program, which resulted in Lockheed Martin being selected to develop and produce the F-35 Lightning II. While drawing from lessons learned from the YF120, the F136 is a conventional fixed-bypass design; it also leveraged advances in turbine engine technology from the Integrated High Performance Turbine Engine Technology (IHPTET) program, which continued developments from ATEGG and JTDE. Despite better performance potential than the incumbent Pratt & Whitney F135 due to a larger core sized for the F-35's revised inlet, the F136 was eventually cancelled due to a lack of funding.

Despite not selecting the YF120 for the ATF, the USAF would further the development of variable cycle engine technology through the Versatile Affordable Advanced Turbine Engines (VAATE), a joint government and industry effort that aims to address future turbine engine needs. Under the VAATE, the Adaptive Versatile Engine Technology (ADVENT) program would continue the development of variable cycle turbine engine technology into an adaptive three-stream architecture. The follow-on Adaptive Engine Technology Demonstrator (AETD) and Adaptive Engine Transition Program (AETP) resulted in the development of the GE XA100 and the P&W XA101 for potential reengining of the F-35; the related Next Generational Adaptive Propulsion (NGAP) was launched to develop the GE XA102 and P&W XA103 for the Next Generation Air Dominance and F/A-XX programs, successors to the ATF.

== Design ==
The YF120 is a twin-spool axial-flow afterburning turbofan. The design consists of a two-stage fan driven by the single-stage low-pressure turbine and a five-stage compressor driven by the single-stage high-pressure turbine. Notably, the engine has two bypass channels which are located at the front and rear of the first compressor stage of the high-pressure spool, also known as the core-driven fan stage; these two bypass channels are key to the engine's variable cycle operation. The annular combustor is a double-dome design. The high and low-pressure spools are counter-rotating, which eliminates the stationary vanes between the turbines and reducing the number of parts and decreasing weight. The engine is controlled by a three-channel fuel-cooled full authority digital engine control (FADEC) system.

While the YF120 design proved to be generally reliable and resistant to stalls, it also exhibited slow throttle response that was considered objectionable by both YF-22 and YF-23 test pilots. Paul Metz, the chief test pilot for the YF-23, attributed this to the engine's attempt at providing a linear thrust response to throttle inputs and thus would need to be addressed for full-scale development if the engine had been selected.

=== Variable cycle ===
The YF120's variable-cycle system worked by varying the bypass ratio of the engine for different flight regimes, allowing the engine to act like either a low bypass turbofan or nearly a turbojet. As a low bypass turbofan (like competitor F119), the engine performed similarly to comparable engines, with the aft bypass channel behind the core-driven fan stage open. When needed, however, the engine could direct more airflow through the hot core of the engine (like a turbojet) by closing the aft bypass channel, increasing the specific thrust of the engine. This made the engine more efficient at high altitude, high thrust levels than a traditional low bypass turbofan. Fan-to-core pressure matching was performed by a variable area bypass injector (VABI).

An expected disadvantage of this variable cycle system would be increased complexity and weight. GE claims to have combated this by using simple pressure driven valves rather than complex mechanically actuated valves to divert airflow. GE stated that this system resulted in the variable cycle system adding only 10 lb (4.5 kg) to the engine. Additionally, a production F120 engine was expected to have 40% fewer parts than the F110 engine.

=== Nozzle ===
The YF120 had different nozzle designs for the YF-22 and YF-23 technology demonstrator prototypes tailored to the specific airframe.

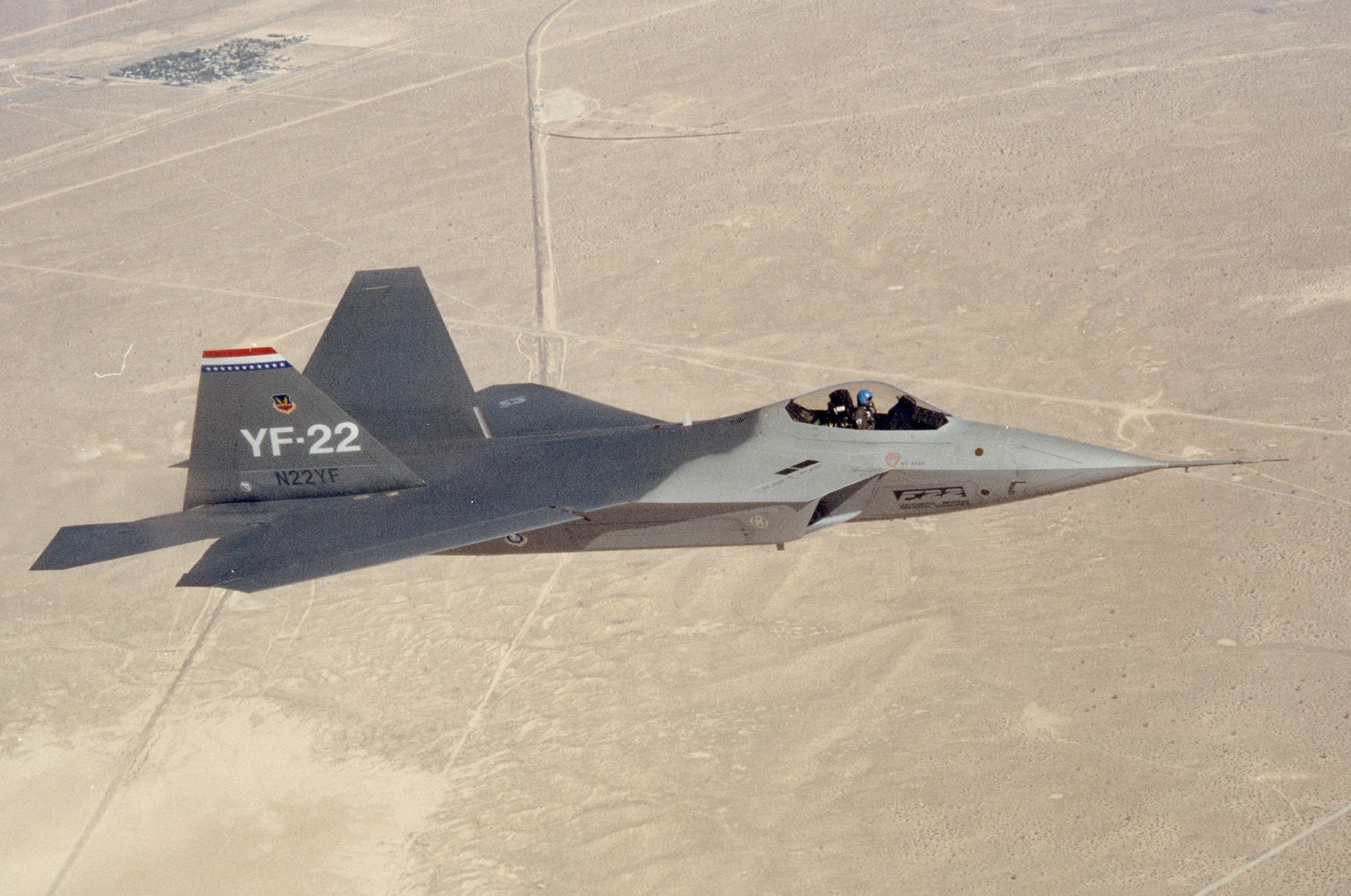
The YF120 on the YF-22, registration number N22YF, was equipped with thrust vectoring nozzles.

The engine for the YF-22 featured a rectangular two-dimensional thrust vectoring nozzle that could vector in the pitch direction. This capability gave the aircraft a serious advantage in pitch agility by greatly increasing the amount of nose pitching moment available to the aircraft. The pitching moment is traditionally generated by the horizontal stabilizer (and/or canard, if applicable), but with a thrust vectoring nozzle that moment can be augmented by the thrust of the engine. During high angle of attack (AoA) demonstrations, the YF120-powered YF-22 flew at trimmed AoA of 60° at 82 knots (152 km/h). At this attitude the aircraft was able to demonstrate controllability. Later analysis revealed that the aircraft could have maintained controlled, trimmed flight up to 70° AoA. The wedge shapes of the nozzle flaps also reduce the infrared signature by flattening the exhaust plume and mixing it with shed vortices for cooling.

On the YF-23, rather than a thrust-vectoring nozzle, the engine had a single-expansion ramp nozzle (SERN), with the top consisting of a variable external flap, or paddle, to control the nozzle area while the bottom was a fixed ramp. The engines were placed well forward of the trailing edge of the YF-23's aft fuselage, where the nacelle at each nozzle transitions to a trough on top of the fuselage aft deck that the exhaust flowed through and was lined with heat-resistant material. This allowed the exhaust plume to be rapidly cooled before exiting the aircraft, significantly reducing the infrared signature particularly when viewed from below; the heat-resistant material of the troughs in the aft deck were tiles that were made out of a porous material called "Lamilloy" from Detroit Diesel Allison and "transpiration cooled" from engine bleed air to withstand the heat of the exhaust.

== Applications ==
- Lockheed YF-22
- Northrop YF-23

== Specifications (YF120-GE-100) ==
Data from Aronstein & Hirschberg, Pace, Norris

==== General characteristics ====
- Type: Twin-Spool, axial-flow, variable-cycle, augmented Turbofan
- Length: 166.8 in (4,237 mm) (without nozzle)
- Diameter: 42 in (1,067 mm) (without nozzle)
- Dry weight: 4,100 lb (1,860 kg) (without nozzle) (Note: The weight is without the divergent nozzle section (station A8-A9), which was considered airframe contractor furnished equipment for ATF Dem/Val prototyping.)

==== Components ====
- Compressor: 2-stage fan, 5-stage high pressure compressor
- Bypass ratio: 0.32:1
- Combustors: Annular combustor
- Turbine: 1-stage HPT, 1-Stage LPT counter-rotating
- Nozzle: Two dimensional vectoring convergent/divergent (YF-22), single-expansion ramp nozzle (YF-23)
- Fuel type: JP-4 or JP-8

==== Performance ====
- Maximum thrust:
  - >23,500 lbf (105 kN) (dry)
  - 35,000 lbf (156 kN) - class (augmented)
- Overall pressure ratio: 22:1
- Thrust-to-weight ratio: >8.54:1 (augmented)

== See also ==
- General Electric XA100

Related development

- General Electric/Rolls-Royce F136

Comparable engines

- Pratt & Whitney F119
- Saturn AL-41

Related lists

- List of aircraft engines
