= General Electric XA102 =

American adaptive cycle engine

XA102
- Type: Adaptive cycle engine
- National origin: United States
- Manufacturer: General Electric
- Major applications: Next Generation Air Dominance (planned)
- Developed from: General Electric XA100

The General Electric XA102 is an American adaptive cycle engine demonstrator being developed by General Electric (GE). Under the United States Air Force's Next Generation Adaptive Propulsion (NGAP) program, it is competing with the Pratt & Whitney XA103 to power the service's sixth generation F-47 air superiority fighter as part of the Next Generation Air Dominance (NGAD) family of systems.

The three-stream adaptive cycle design can direct air to the bypass third stream for increased fuel efficiency and cooling or to the core and fan streams for additional thrust and performance. The engine thrust has not been disclosed, although it is speculated by aviation reporters to be in the 35,000 lbf (156 kN) thrust class.

== Development ==
The U.S. Air Force and U.S. Navy began pursuing adaptive cycle engines in 2007 with the Adaptive Versatile Engine Technology (ADVENT) program, a part of the larger Versatile Affordable Advanced Turbine Engines (VAATE) program. This technology research program was then followed by the Adaptive Engine Technology Demonstrator (AETD) program in 2012, which continued to mature the technology, with tests performed using demonstrator engines. GE's ground demonstrator consists of a three-stage adaptive fan and a high pressure compressor derived from CFM LEAP's ten-stage compressor; the tests in 2015 yielded the highest combined compressor and turbine temperatures in the history of jet propulsion. The follow-on Adaptive Engine Transition Program (AETP) was launched in 2016 to develop and test adaptive engines for sixth generation fighter propulsion as well as potential re-engining of the F-35 from the existing F135 turbofan engine. The demonstrators were assigned the designation XA100 for General Electric's design and XA101 for Pratt & Whitney's. While the XA100 and XA101 became focused on the potential re-engine of the F-35, a separate engine program was initiated for the Air Force's Next Generation Air Dominance fighter, which is expected to be optimized differently with a greater emphasis on supersonic cruise (or supercruise) performance; this program became the Next Generation Adaptive Propulsion (NGAP) and the entrants were the General Electric XA102 and Pratt & Whitney XA103.

Critical design review of the XA102 was completed in December 2023, and flight testing is expected to begin in the late 2020s.

== Design ==
The XA102 is a three-stream adaptive cycle engine that can adjust the bypass ratio and fan pressure to increase fuel efficiency or thrust, depending on the scenario. It does this by employing an adaptive fan that can direct air into a third bypass stream in order to increase fuel economy and act as a heat sink for cooling. The increased cooling and power generation also enables the potential employment of directed energy weapons in the future. When additional thrust is needed, the air from the third stream can be directed to the core and fan streams. In addition to three-stream adaptive cycle configuration, the engine also uses new heat-resistant materials such as ceramic matrix composites (CMC) to enable higher turbine temperatures and improved performance.

== Applications ==
- Next Generation Air Dominance (planned)

== Specifications (XA102-GE-100) ==
Data from Royal Aeronautics Society

==== General characteristics ====
- Type: Three-stream adaptive cycle engine
- Length:
- Diameter:
- Dry weight:

==== Components ====
- Compressor:

==== Performance ====
- Maximum thrust:
  - 35,000 lbf (156 kN) class (with afterburner)

== See also ==
- Adaptive Versatile Engine Technology

Related development

- General Electric XA100

Comparable engines

- Pratt & Whitney XA103

Related lists

- List of aircraft engines
