= Pratt & Whitney F119 =

American low-bypass turbofan engine for the F-22 Raptor

F119
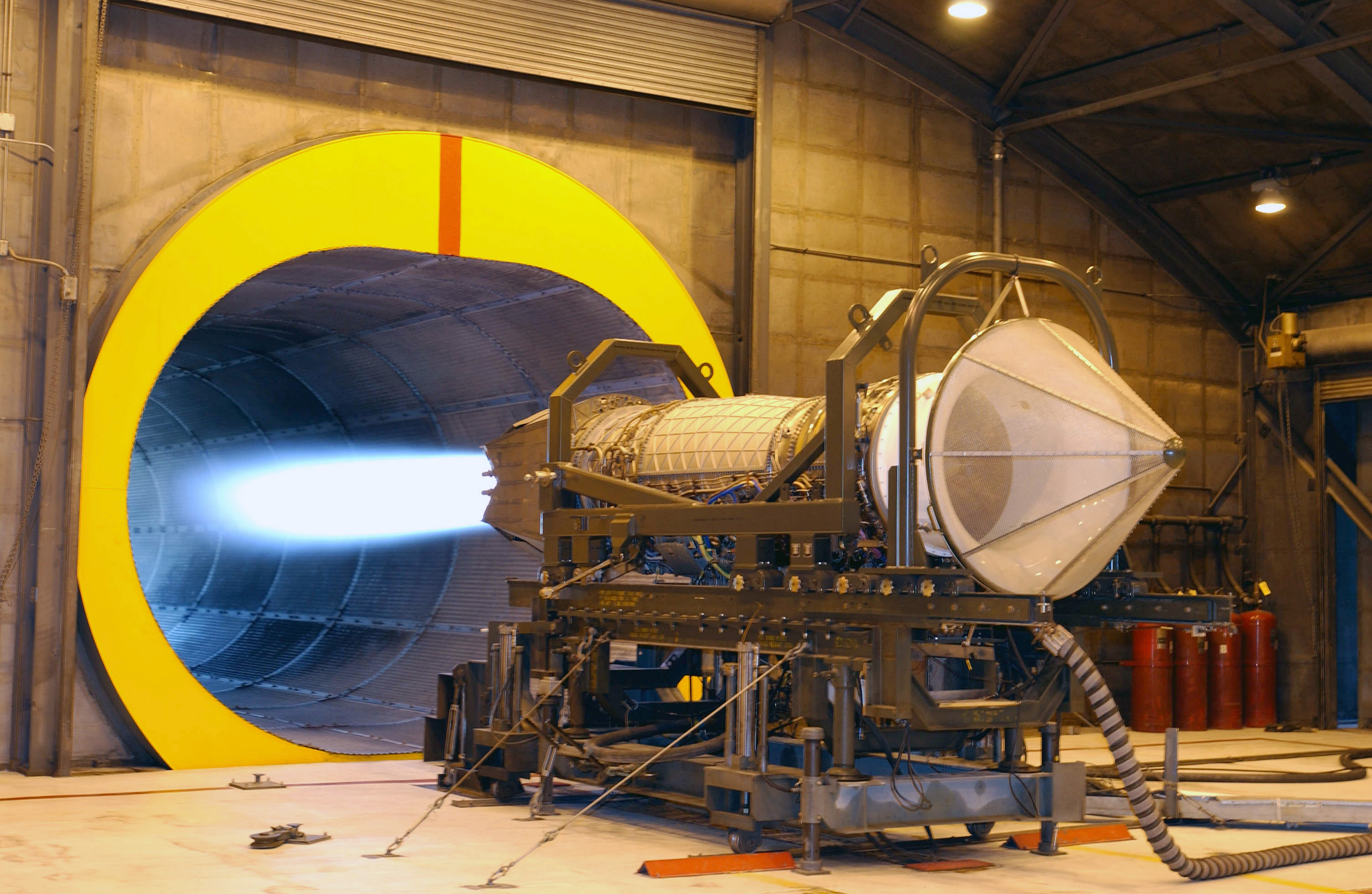
- F119 engine on test
- Type: Turbofan
- National origin: United States
- Manufacturer: Pratt & Whitney
- Major applications: Lockheed Martin F-22 Raptor
- Number built: 507
- Developed into: Pratt & Whitney F135

The Pratt & Whitney F119, company designation PW5000, is an afterburning turbofan engine developed by Pratt & Whitney for the Advanced Tactical Fighter (ATF) program, which resulted in the Lockheed Martin F-22 Raptor. The engine delivers thrust in the 35,000 lbf (156 kN) class and was designed for sustained supersonic flight without afterburners, or supercruise; the F119 allows the F-22 to achieve supercruise speeds of up to Mach 1.8. (Note: The F119 delivers almost 22% more thrust with 40% fewer parts than the company's F100.) The F119's nozzles incorporate thrust vectoring that enable them to direct the engine thrust ±20° in the pitch axis to give the F-22 enhanced maneuverability.

The F119 is also the basis for the Joint Strike Fighter (JSF) propulsion system, with variants powering both the Boeing X-32 and Lockheed Martin X-35 concept demonstrators. The X-35 won the JSF competition and the production Lockheed Martin F-35 Lightning II is powered by an F119 derivative, the Pratt & Whitney F135 which produces up to 43,000 lbf (191 kN) of thrust.

== History ==
The F119 resulted from the Joint Advanced Fighter Engine (JAFE) program in the early 1980s aimed at supplying the powerplant for the Air Force's Advanced Tactical Fighter (ATF) and the Navy's Advanced Carrier-Based Multirole Fighter (VFMX). Detailed design of Pratt & Whitney's submission, designated internally as PW5000, began when the request for proposals (RFP) for JAFE, later renamed the ATF Engine (ATFE) program with the cancellation of VFMX, was released in May 1983. Advances in engine technology, such as those from the Advanced Turbine Engine Gas Generator (ATEGG) and the Joint Technology Demonstration Engine (JTDE) programs, allowed the design to do more work with fewer stages, with the PW5000's compressor having only 6 stages compared to the 10 stages in the F100's compressor. The high pressure and low pressure turbines were single stage and counter-rotating, which reduced the gyroscopic forces on the engine; it was hoped that counter-rotation would eliminate a row of turbine stators for a vaneless high and low pressure turbine interface, which would save weight and reduce parts count, but this was ultimately not successful and the stators were retained. The fan and compressor stages were to use integrally bladed rotors (IBR), also known as blisks, to reduce weight and cost and improve performance. Owing to the ATF's demanding requirements for supercruise, the PW5000 design has low bypass ratio, high core and turbine inlet temperatures, and a fully variable convergent-divergent nozzle to achieve high specific thrust in intermediate, or non-afterburning power. The combustor, internally named Floatwall, eliminated welds to mitigate crack growth due to thermal cycling. The original RFP called for maximum thrust in the 30,000 lbf (133 kN) class for an aircraft gross weight of 50,000 lb (22,700 kg).

Pratt & Whitney and General Electric were selected to make prototype engines, designated YF119 and YF120 respectively, for demonstration and validation (Dem/Val). Both engine makers would provide engines for both the Lockheed/Boeing/General Dynamics YF-22 and the Northrop/McDonnell Douglas YF-23 ATF technology and flight demonstrators. The ATF's increasing weight during development required more thrust to meet the performance requirements; as gross weight grew to 60,000 lb (27,200 kg), the required thrust was increased by 20% to over 23,500 lbf (105 kN) in military/intermediate power and 35,000 lbf (156 kN) class in full afterburner. Pratt & Whitney's design changed to incorporate a 15% larger fan, increasing bypass ratio from 0.25 to 0.30. However, unlike General Electric, Pratt & Whitney did not fit its larger fan on flightworthy YF119s for the ATF flight demonstrators to avoid potential reliability issues that may arise. Instead, the revised fan was extensively ground tested at Wright-Patterson Air Force Base. As a result, both the YF-22 and YF-23 had lower performance with the YF119s than with the YF120s. (Note: The fan of the F119 demonstrated margin of 10% higher unaugmented thrust over the specification, indicating approximately 26,000 lbf thrust in intermediate power.)

On 3 August 1991, Pratt & Whitney was awarded the full-scale development, or engineering and manufacturing development (EMD) contract for ATF engine, while the Lockheed/Boeing/General Dynamics team won the contract for the ATF airframe. While the YF119 was a more conventional design compared to the General Electric's variable cycle YF120, Pratt & Whitney accrued far greater test hours (50% more) and emphasized reliability and the lower risk.

Ground tests of the EMD F119 configuration were first conducted in February 1993. Full-scale development initially encountered issues with the high-pressure turbine causing the design to miss its subsonic fuel efficiency, or specific fuel consumption (SFC) requirements, by up to 8%; engineering changes to the turbine and stator allowed the engine to achieve within 2% of the requirement. The EMD configuration of the F119 for the EMD/production F-22, designated F119-PW-100, and first flew on the aircraft's maiden flight on 7 September 1997. A total of 507 engines were produced. The F119 Heavy Maintenance Center (HMC) for depot overhaul is located at Tinker Air Force Base, Oklahoma, with the first overall completed in 2013.

Turbine engine advances from ATEGG and JTDE continued with the Integrated High Performance Turbine Engine Technology (IHPTET) program, with applications in F119 improvement packages and derivatives. Prototype YF119 variants powered the Boeing X-32 and Lockheed Martin X-35 Joint Strike Fighter (JSF) concept demonstrator aircraft, and subsequent full scale development of the F119 derivative resulted in the F135 family of engines that powers the Lockheed Martin F-35 Lightning II. Operational data has also allowed Pratt & Whitney to adjust the software to increase the dynamic thrust at certain parts of the envelope.

For the future of the F119-PW-100, Pratt & Whitney secured a 1.5 billion dollar contract in February 2025 to sustain the engines. Along with this sustainment Pratt & Whitney will also modernize the engine with things such as ease of maintenance, availability and general modernization

== Design ==
The F119 is a twin-spool axial-flow low-bypass turbofan. It has a three-stage fan driven by a single-stage low pressure turbine and six-stage high pressure compressor driven by single-stage high pressure turbine. The shroud-less fan has wide-chord, low aspect ratio hollow titanium fan blades that are linear-friction welded to the disks to form single-piece integrally-bladed rotors (IBRs), or blisks. The fan and compressor stators and thrust-vectoring nozzle use a burn-resistant titanium alloy called Alloy C, with the first row of vanes variable in order to increase stall and surge margin. The Floatwall annular combustor is lined with high-cobalt material for oxidation resistance and combustion chamber durability, and ensures the clean burning of the fuel and reduced NOx generation. Within the turbine exhaust case, the high-pressure turbine blades are made of single-crystal superalloys and impingement cooled using air from the high-pressure compressor. The high and low pressure spools are counter-rotating. The requirement for the ATF to supercruise, or fly supersonic without afterburners, results in a very low bypass ratio of 0.30 for the F119-PW-100 in order to achieve high specific thrust. The F119 has dual-redundant full authority digital engine control (FADEC), also referred to internally as Digital Electronic Engine Control (DEEC), supplied by Hamilton Standard and fully integrated into the F-22's vehicle management system, making the engine highly reliable, stall-resistant, and forgiving of rapid throttle inputs.

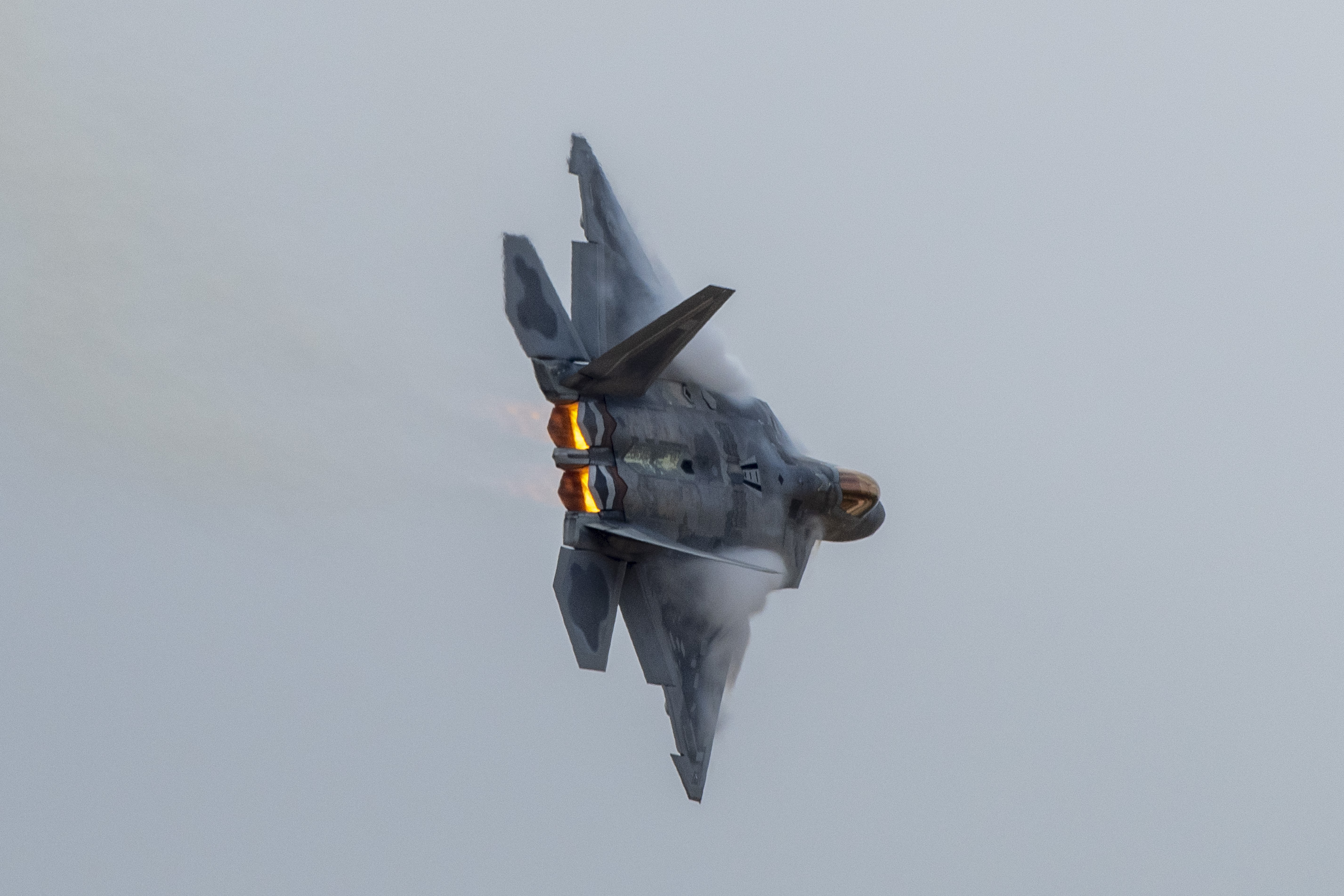
The F119's distinctive rectangular thrust vectoring nozzle on the F-22.

The three-zone (reduced from four from the prototype) afterburner, or augmentor, contributes to the stealth of the aircraft by having fuel injectors integrated into thick curved vanes coated with ceramic radar-absorbent materials (RAM). These vanes replace the traditional fuel spray bars and flame holders and block line-of-sight of the turbines. The rectangular, convergent-divergent, two-dimensional thrust vectoring nozzle is fully variable for both the convergent throat and divergent exit areas for high nozzle pressure ratio and can vector ±20° in the pitch axis, greatly improving the aircraft's pitch authority by augmenting the pitching moment of the tail with engine thrust; this enables the F-22 to remain controllable while flying at a trimmed alpha of over 60°. The thrust vectoring is fully integrated into the F-22's flight control system to facilitate handling. The rectangular nozzle's divergent section consists two wedge-shaped flaps for stealth and also contribute to lower infrared signature by flattening the exhaust plume and facilitating its mixing with ambient air through shed vortices.

The F119 places a high emphasis on human systems integration; features that facilitate engine maintenance and servicing include modular design such as an axially split case, color-coded cables and harnesses, and a reduction of the number of hand tools required for servicing to just five. Most components are one-deep and servicing can be conducted while wearing hazmat protective clothing. The engine has a design life of 8,650 total accumulated cycles, with inspection and overhaul of the hot section approximately every 2,000 hours and the cold section every 4,000 hours.

=== Prototype variants ===
While the production F119 on the F-22 incorporates rectangular thrust vectoring nozzles, prototype variants on other aircraft had different nozzle solutions that are tailored to the airframe.

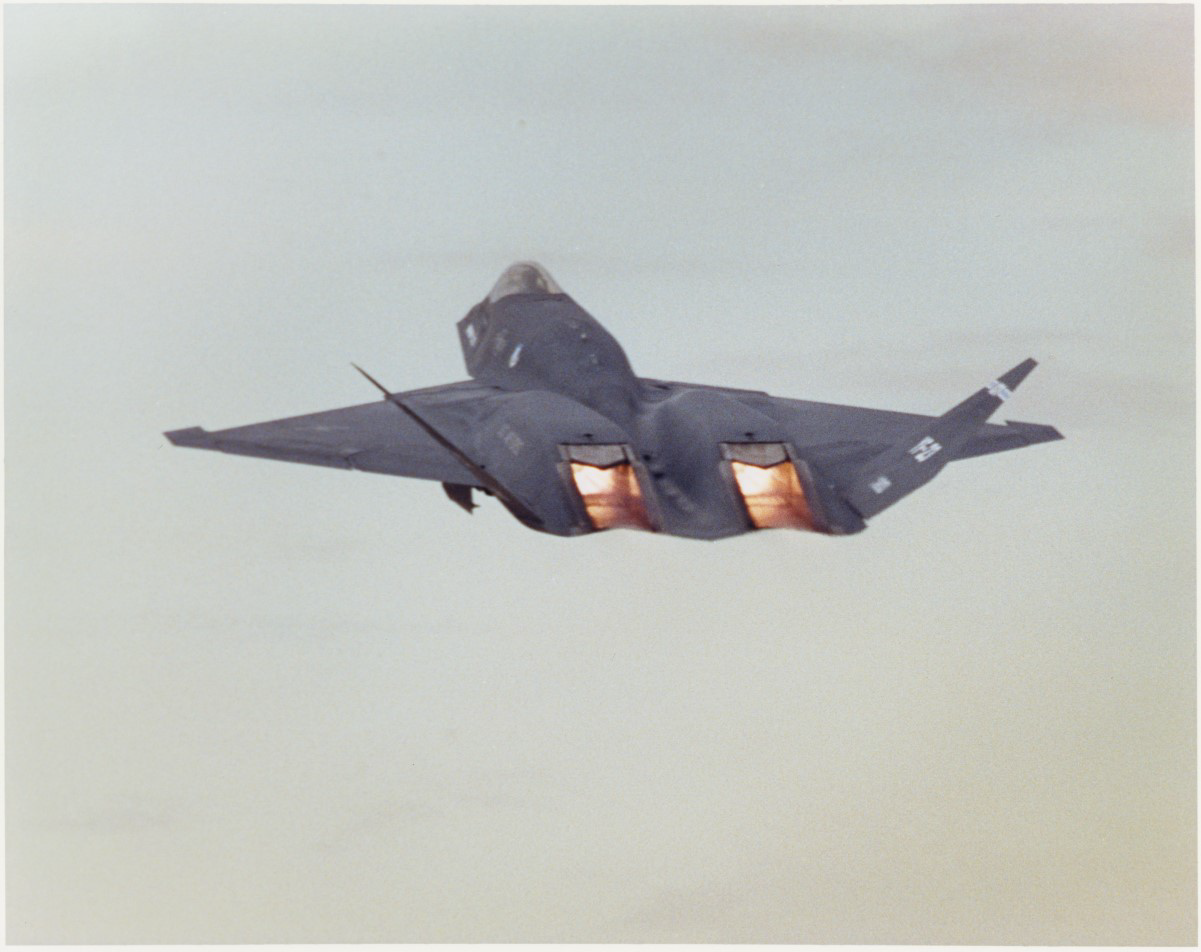
YF-23 with YF119 engines taking off in afterburners, showing the exhaust trough in the aft deck.

The YF119 on the YF-23 had a single-expansion ramp nozzle (SERN) consisting of a variable wedge flap, or paddle, on the top to control the nozzle area and a fixed ramp on the bottom, which then transitioned to a trough on top of the fuselage aft deck. While the SERN lacked thrust vectoring capability, it allowed the exhaust to be further cooled in the troughs, significantly reducing infrared signature when viewed from below the aircraft; the troughs in the aft deck were lined with heat-abating tiles that were made out of a porous material called "Lamilloy" from Detroit Diesel Allison and "transpiration cooled" from engine bleed air to withstand the heat of the exhaust.

The specialized YF119 variants on the X-32 and X-35 had provisions for short takeoff and vertical landing (STOVL) operations. Both were 40,000 lbf (178 kN) thrust class engines. The YF119-PW-614 on the X-32 had a pitch-axis thrust vectoring nozzle and valves can redirect the engine exhaust and bleed air to provide direct lift, similar to the Pegasus engine on the Harrier. In contrast, YF119-PW-611 on the X-35 had a round axisymmetric nozzle that can swivel downwards while the low-pressure spool drives a lift fan that's engaged through a clutch; engine bypass air is also routed to roll posts for additional lift and stability. The X-35 won the JSF competition and its shaft-driven lift fan system, called LiftSystem, was fully developed by Rolls-Royce and Pratt & Whitney for the F135-PW-600.

== Variants ==
- YF119-PW-100L: Prototype engine for the YF-22; rated 30,000 lbf thrust class.
- YF119-PW-100N: Prototype engine for the YF-23; rated 30,000 lbf thrust class.
- F119-PW-100: Production engine for the F-22A with larger fan and increased bypass ratio (BPR) rated for 35,000 lbf thrust class.
- YF119-PW-611: Prototype engine for the X-35; rated 40,000 lbf thrust class.
- YF119-PW-614: Prototype engine for the X-32; rated 40,000 lbf thrust class.

== Applications ==
- Boeing X-32 (YF119-PW-614)
- Lockheed YF-22 (YF119-PW-100L)
- Lockheed Martin F-22 Raptor (F119-PW-100)
- Lockheed Martin X-35 (YF119-PW-611)
- Northrop YF-23 (YF119-PW-100N)
- Rockwell B-1R Lancer (Proposed) (F119-PW-100)

== Specifications (F119-PW-100) ==
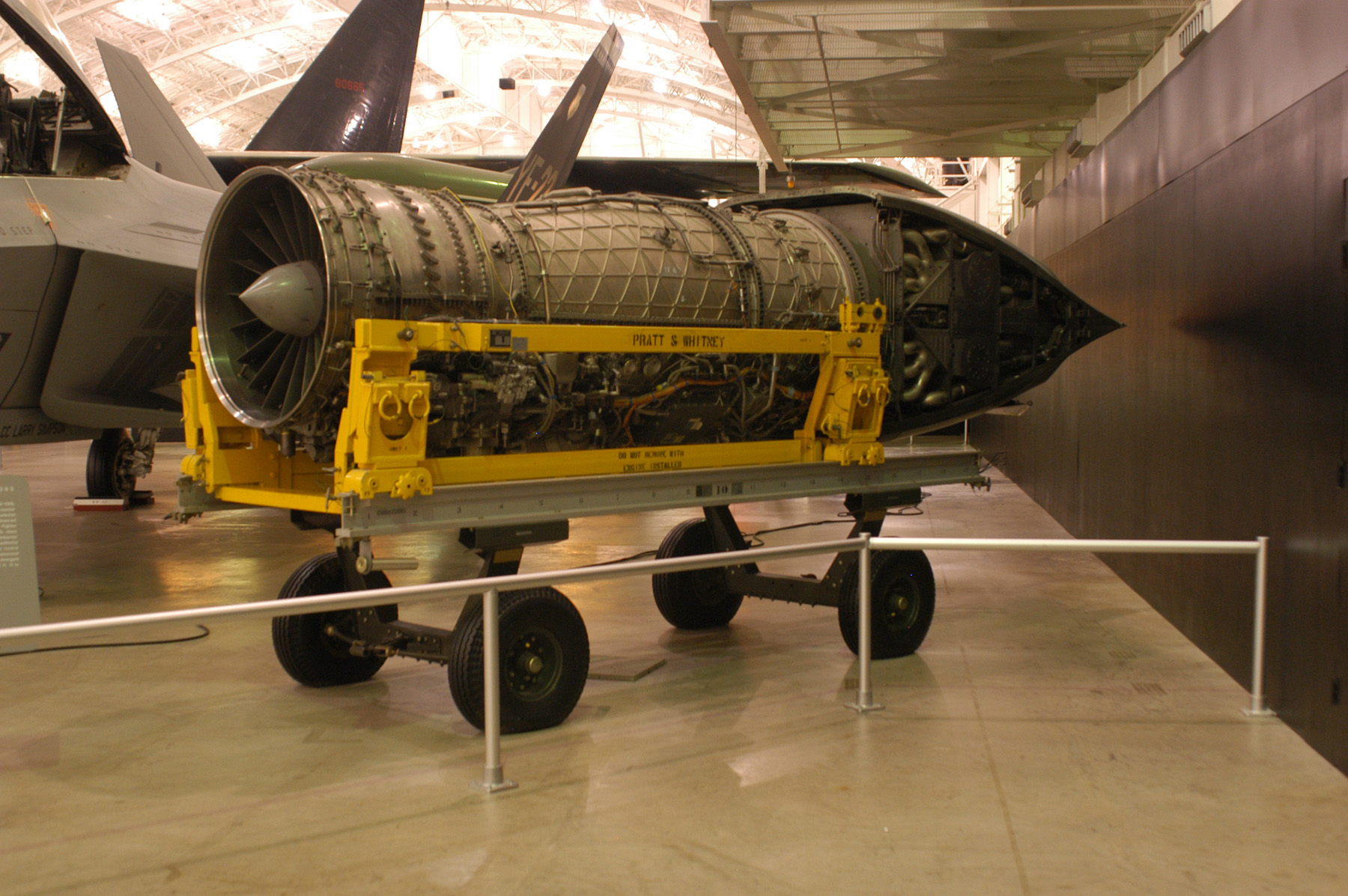
YF119 fan

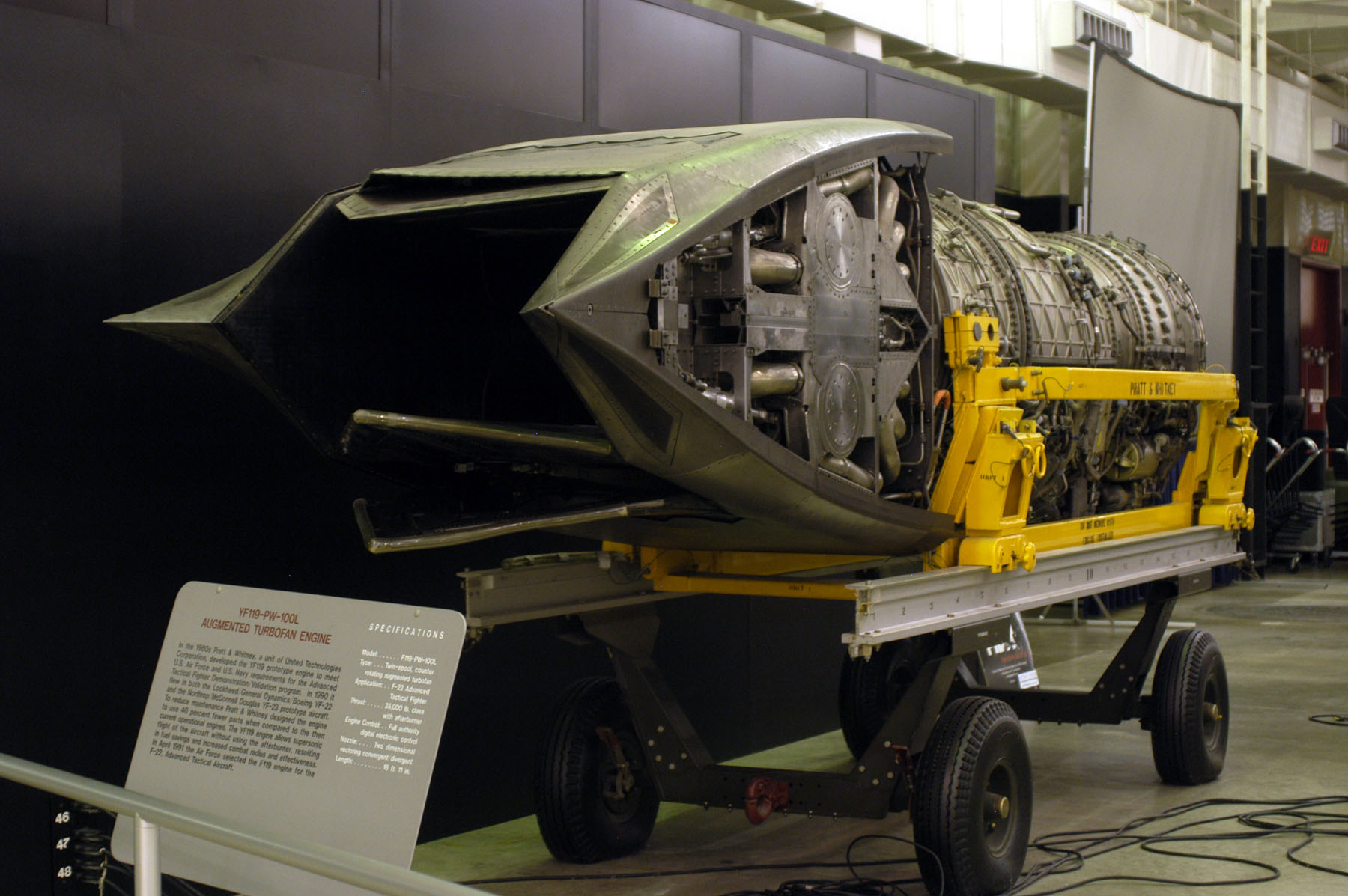
YF119-PW-100L thrust vectoring nozzle, designed for the YF-22

Data from Aronstein & Hirschberg, Pratt & Whitney, RAND, Aviation Week, USAF TO-00-85-20.

==== General characteristics ====
- Type: Twin-spool, axial-flow augmented turbofan
- Length: 196 in (497.8 cm) with nozzle flaps open (Note: 203 in (515.6 cm) for the YF119-PW-100L prototype with the longer nozzle structure.)
- Diameter: 38 in (97 cm) inlet, 48 in (122 cm) overall, 50 in (127 cm) maximum
- Dry weight: Approx. 5,000 lb (2,270 kg) overall (Note: Approx. 3,900 lb (1,769 kg) for the YF119-PW-100L prototype without the divergent nozzle section (Station A8/A9), which was considered airframe contractor furnished equipment for ATF Dem/Val prototyping.)

==== Components ====
- Compressor: 3-stage fan, 6-stage high-pressure compressor
- Bypass ratio: 0.30:1
- Combustors: Annular combustor
- Turbine: 1-stage high-pressure, 1-stage low-pressure counterrotating turbines
- Nozzle: 2-dimensional vectoring convergent-divergent
- Fuel type: JP-8

==== Performance ====
- Maximum thrust:
  - 26,000 lbf (116 kN) (military/intermediate power)
  - >35,000 lbf (156 kN) (with afterburner) (Note: Actual thrust is in the 37,000–39,000 lbf (164.6–173.5 kN) range)
- Overall pressure ratio: 26:1
- Turbine inlet temperature: 3,000 °F (1,649 °C; 1,922 K)
- Thrust-to-weight ratio: 5.2:1 (intermediate), 7.0:1 (afterburning)

== See also ==
Related development

- Pratt & Whitney F135

Comparable engines

- General Electric YF120
- Saturn AL-41
- Saturn AL-51
- Xian WS-15

Related lists

- List of aircraft engines
