= General Electric XA100 =

American adaptive cycle engine

XA100
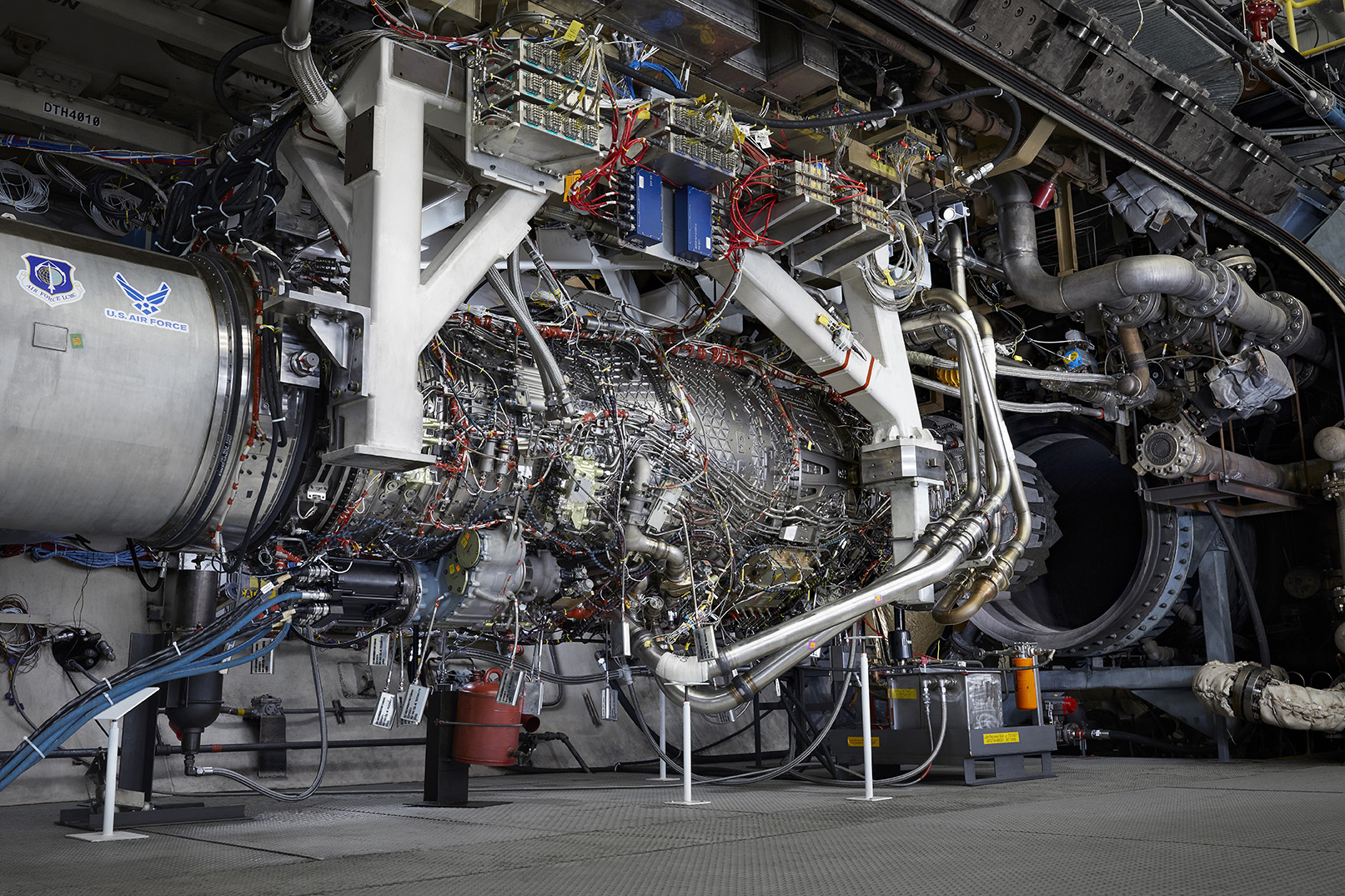
- XA100 on test stand
- Type: Adaptive cycle engine
- National origin: United States
- Manufacturer: General Electric
- First run: December 2020
- Major applications: Lockheed Martin F-35 Lightning II (proposed)
- Developed into: General Electric XA102

The General Electric XA100 is an American adaptive cycle engine demonstrator being developed by General Electric (GE) for the Lockheed Martin F-35 Lightning II and forms the technological foundation for the company's XA102 propulsion system for the United States Air Force's sixth generation fighter program, the Next Generation Air Dominance (NGAD).

The XA100 directly competes with the Pratt & Whitney XA101. The three-stream adaptive cycle design can direct air to the bypass third stream for increased fuel efficiency and cooling or to the core and fan streams for additional thrust and performance. The 45,000 lbf (200 kN) thrust class engine is expected to be significantly more powerful and efficient than existing low-bypass turbofans.

== Development ==
The U.S. Air Force and U.S. Navy began pursuing adaptive cycle engine in 2007 with the Adaptive Versatile Engine Technology (ADVENT) program, a part of the larger Versatile Affordable Advanced Turbine Engines (VAATE) program. This technology research program was then followed by the Adaptive Engine Technology Demonstrator (AETD) program in 2012, which continued to mature the technology, with tests performed using demonstrator engines. GE's ground demonstrator consists of a three-stage adaptive fan and a high pressure compressor derived from CFM LEAP’s ten-stage compressor; the tests in 2015 yielded the highest combined compressor and turbine temperatures in the history of jet propulsion. The follow-on Adaptive Engine Transition Program (AETP) was launched in 2016 to develop and test adaptive engines for sixth generation fighter propulsion as well as potential re-engining of the F-35 from the existing F135 turbofan engine. The demonstrators were assigned the designation XA100 for General Electric's design and XA101 for Pratt & Whitney's. The AETP goal is to demonstrate 25% improved fuel efficiency, 10% additional thrust, and significantly better thermal management.

Further contract awards and modifications from Air Force Life Cycle Management Center (AFLCMC) in 2018 increased the focus on re-engining of the F-35, and GE's design became "F-35 design-centric"; there has also been investigations on applying the technology in upgrades for F-15, F-16, and F-22 propulsion systems. GE's detailed design was completed in February 2019, and initial testing at GE's high-altitude test facility in Evendale, Ohio was concluded in May 2021. GE expects that the A100 can enter service with the F-35A and C in 2027 at the earliest. However, in 2023 the USAF chose an improved F135 under the Engine Core Upgrade (ECU) program over an adaptive cycle engine such as the XA100 due to cost as well as concerns over risk of integrating the new engine, initially designed for the F-35A, on the B and C.

== Design ==
The XA100 is a three-stream adaptive cycle engine. Based on GE's public renderings, the engine has a 3-stage adaptive fan and 7-stage compressor, as well as a 2-stage high pressure and 2-stage low pressure turbine. The XA100 can adjust the bypass ratio and fan pressure ratio to increase fuel efficiency or thrust, depending on the scenario, by employing an adaptive fan that can direct air into a third bypass stream in order to increase fuel economy and act as a heat sink for cooling; in particular, this would enable greater use of the high speed, low altitude part of the F-35 envelope. The increased cooling and power generation also enables the potential employment of directed energy weapons in the future. When additional thrust is needed, the air from the third stream can be directed to the core and fan streams. In addition to three-stream adaptive cycle configuration, the engine also uses new heat-resistant materials such as ceramic matrix composites (CMC) to enable higher turbine temperatures and improved performance. According to GE, the engine can offer up to 35% increased range and 25% reduction in fuel burn over current low-bypass turbofans.

== Applications ==
- Lockheed Martin F-35 (proposed)

== Specifications (XA100-GE-100) ==
Data from Flight Global, General Electric

==== General characteristics ====
- Type: Three-stream adaptive cycle engine
- Length: ~220 in (5.59 m)
- Diameter: ~48 in (1,219 mm) max
- Dry weight:

==== Components ====
- Compressor: 3-stage adaptive fan, 7-stage compressor
- Bypass ratio: Variable
- Combustors: Annular
- Turbine: 2-stage high pressure, 2-stage low-pressure

==== Performance ====
- Maximum thrust:
  - 45,000 lbf (200 kN) class (with afterburner)

== See also ==
- Adaptive Versatile Engine Technology

Related development

- General Electric YF120
- General Electric XA102

Comparable engines

- Pratt & Whitney XA101

Related lists

- List of aircraft engines
