= F120 =

F120 may refer to:

- Farman F.120, a 1920 family of multi-engine airliners and bombers
- General Electric YF120, a 1980s advanced aircraft engine
