= Integrated High Performance Turbine Engine Technology =

Integrated High Performance Turbine Engine Technology (IHPTET)
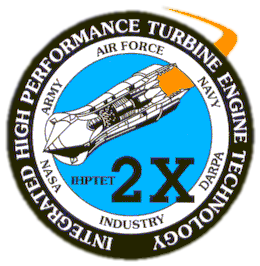
- Type of project: Research
- Country: United States
- Launched: 1987
- Closed: 2005
- Status: closed

The Integrated High Performance Turbine Engine Technology program was a project of the United States military, DARPA, and NASA. Its objective was to conduct science and technology research that would secure advancements in the engineering of the gas turbine engines used in military aircraft. It ran from 1987 until 2005.

IHPTET designated goals in each of three engine classes: turbofan/turbojet, turboprop/turboshaft, and expendable engines. For the turbofan class the primary goal was to double the engine thrust-to-weight ratio.

The program made many significant developments which have been employed in such aircraft as the F-35 / Joint Strike Fighter. It was firmly regarded as successful although it did not fully achieve its explicit goals. It was succeeded by the Versatile Affordable Advanced Turbine Engines (VAATE) program.

== See also ==
- Advanced Affordable Turbine Engine (AATE)
- Adaptive Versatile Engine Technology (ADVENT)
