= Pratt & Whitney XA101 =

American adaptive cycle engine

XA101
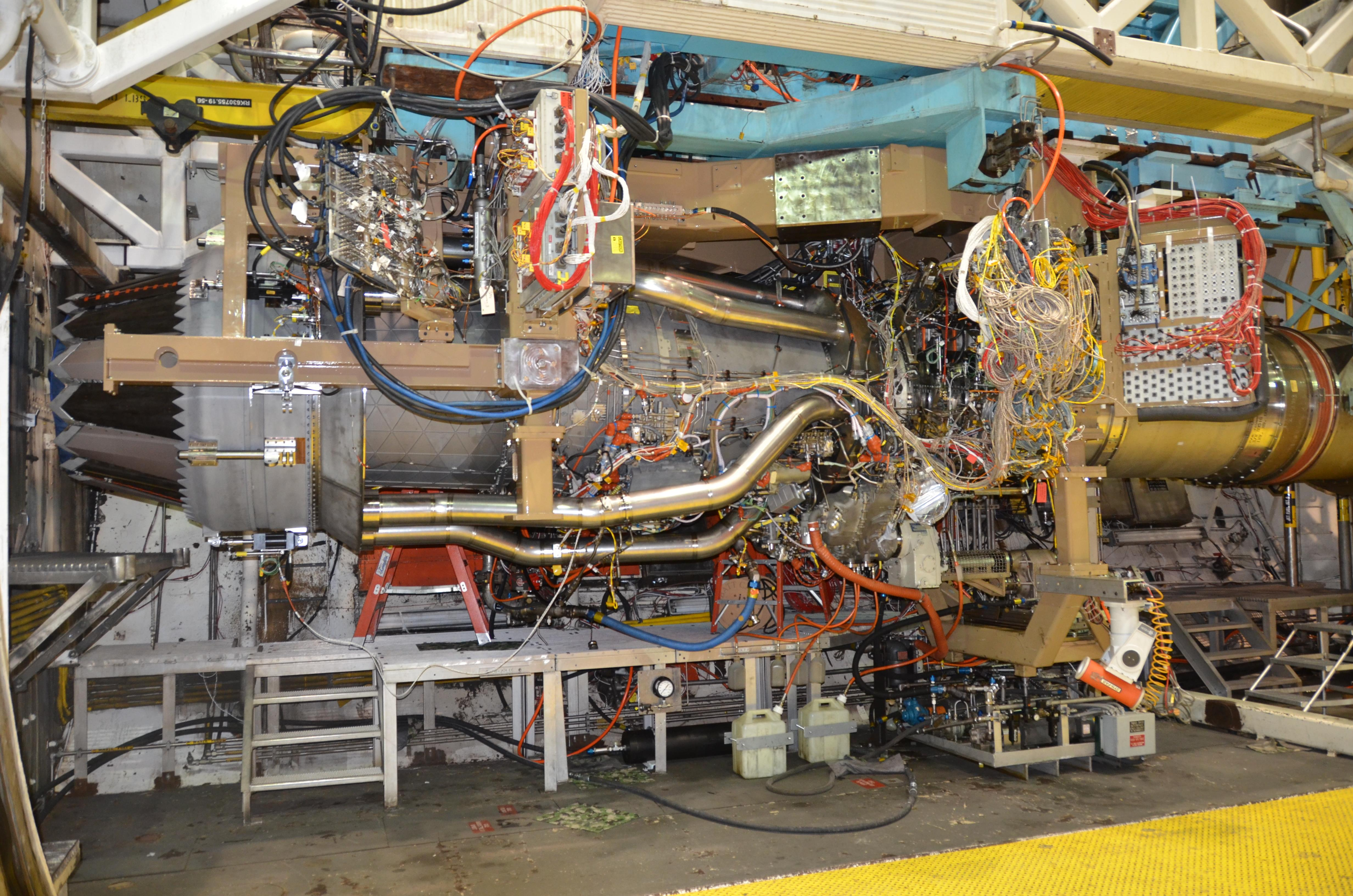
- XA101 adaptive fan being tested at Arnold Engineering Development Complex (AEDC)
- Type: Adaptive cycle engine
- National origin: United States
- Manufacturer: Pratt & Whitney
- First run: 2021
- Major applications: Lockheed Martin F-35 Lightning II (proposed)
- Developed into: Pratt & Whitney XA103

The Pratt & Whitney XA101 is an American adaptive cycle engine demonstrator being developed by Pratt & Whitney for the Lockheed Martin F-35 Lightning II and form the technological foundation for the company's XA103 propulsion system for the United States Air Force's sixth generation fighter program, the Next Generation Air Dominance (NGAD).

The XA101 competes directly with the General Electric XA100. The three-stream adaptive cycle design can direct air to the bypass third stream for increased fuel efficiency and cooling or to the core and fan streams for additional thrust and performance. The 45,000 lbf (200 kN) thrust class engine is expected to be significantly more powerful and efficient than existing low-bypass turbofans.

== Development ==
The U.S. Air Force and U.S. Navy began pursuing the adaptive cycle engine concept in 2007 with the Adaptive Versatile Engine Technology (ADVENT) program, a part of the larger Versatile Affordable Advanced Turbine Engines (VAATE) program. While not involved with ADVENT, Pratt & Whitney was selected alongside General Electric for the Adaptive Engine Technology Demonstrator (AETD) program that followed in 2012; this program continued to mature the technology, with tests performed using demonstrator engines. The next step, the Adaptive Engine Transition Program (AETP), was launched in 2016 to develop adaptive engines for sixth-generation fighter propulsion as well as potential re-engining of the F-35 from the existing F135 turbofan engine. The General Electric demonstrator was designated XA100 and the P&W engine was designated XA101. The AETP goal was to demonstrate 25% improved fuel efficiency, 10% additional thrust, and improved thermal management.

In 2017, Pratt & Whitney successfully tested an adaptive three-stream fan with an F135 core, and considered the XA101 to be "Growth Option 2.0" in its long-term development plan for the F135. Further contract awards and modifications from Air Force Life Cycle Management Center (AFLCMC) in 2018 increased the focus on re-engining of the F-35; there has also been investigations on applying the technology in upgrades for F-15, F-16, and F-22 propulsion systems. In June 2018, Pratt & Whitney changed its development plan for the F135, and instead offered an adaptive three-stream fan as Growth Option 2.0 that is separate from the XA101, which would instead have a new engine core. In 2020, the F135 development plan shifted from "Growth Options" to "Engine Enhancement Packages" (EEP), while the three-stream XA101 is a new engine with potential re-engining for the F-35A. Ground testing of the XA101 began in September 2021.

Also in September 2021, Pratt & Whitney publicly stated serious doubts about the cost effectiveness of AETP's future for the F-35, stating that the XA101 was "always intended … to be a sixth-generation [powerplant for sixth-generation fighters]." Jennifer Latka, Vice President of the F135 program, explained: “There’s a significant amount of risk that comes with brand-new technology, and that would require a tremendous amount of validation to be done. We’re saying, the AETP is not the right fit for the F-35.” Instead, Pratt & Whitney is proposing a "drop-in" enhanced engine package that would improve thrust and range by 10% while also offering a 50% improvement in thermal management. While this falls short of the AETP's goal of a 25% improvement in fuel efficiency, Pratt & Whitney argues the savings would be worth it, estimating the cost of developing AETP for the F-35 at up to $40 Billion. As of 2021, thermal management had been an ongoing issue for the F135, largely due to the increased sustainment and maintenance costs caused from heat damage by running the engines hotter in order to take full advantage of newer, more powerful sensors and electronics being integrated into Block 4+ F-35s. The sensors and electronics subsequently require additional cooling to take full advantage of the aircraft's capability. GE had previously stated that one advantage of their AETP XA100 engine is its third airstream, which its officials say can be used to help cool the F-35’s electronics. Nonetheless, Latka urged an official review of the program's requirements, stating, “We need to crystallize on what the requirement is, and then we figure out what the most cost-effective solution is once we understand that requirement."

In 2023 the USAF chose an improved F135 under the Engine Core Upgrade (ECU) program over an adaptive cycle engine such as the XA101 due to cost as well as concerns over risk of integrating the new engine, initially designed for the F-35A, on the B and C.

== Design ==
The XA101 is a three-stream adaptive cycle engine that can adjust the bypass ratio and fan pressure to increase fuel efficiency or thrust, depending on the scenario. It does this by employing a third bypass stream around the entire engine, with the ability to modulate the portion of airflow into the engine core or through this third stream, to increase fuel economy and act as a heat sink for cooling. This capability enables greater use of the high-speed, low-altitude portion of the F-35 flight regime. The increased cooling and power generation also enables the potential employment of directed-energy weapons in the future. When additional thrust is needed, the air from the third stream can be directed into the core and fan streams for increased performance.

== Applications ==
- Lockheed Martin F-35 (proposed)

== Specifications (XA101-PW-100) ==
Data from Flight Global,

==== General characteristics ====
- Type: Three-stream adaptive cycle engine
- Length: ~220 in (5.59 m)
- Diameter: ~48 in (1,219 mm) max
- Dry weight:

==== Components ====
- Compressor:

==== Performance ====
- Maximum thrust:
  - 45,000 lbf (200 kN) class (with afterburner)

== See also ==
- Adaptive Versatile Engine Technology

Related development

- Pratt & Whitney XA103

Comparable engines

- General Electric XA100

Related lists

- List of aircraft engines
