= Variable cycle engine =

Aircraft propulsion system efficient at a range of speeds higher and lower than sound's

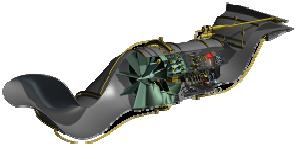
Cut-away view of a prospective Adaptive Versatile Engine Technology (ADVENT) engine

A variable cycle engine (VCE), also referred to as adaptive cycle engine (ACE), is an aircraft jet engine that is designed to operate efficiently under mixed flight conditions, such as subsonic, transonic and supersonic.

An advanced technology engine is a turbine engine that allows different turbines to spin at different, individually optimum speeds, instead of at one speed for all. It emerged on larger airplanes, before finding other applications.

The next generation of supersonic transport (SST) may require some form of VCE. To reduce aircraft drag at supercruise, SST engines require a high specific thrust (net thrust/airflow) to minimize the powerplant's cross-sectional area. This implies a high jet velocity during supersonic cruise and at take-off, which makes the aircraft noisy.

== Specific thrust ==
A high specific thrust engine has a high jet velocity by definition, as implied by the approximate equation for net thrust:

$$F_\text{n} = \dot{m} \left(V_\text{jfe} - V_\text{a}\right)$$

where:

$\dot{m} = \frac{d}{dt}m,\,$ intake mass flow rate
$V_\text{jfe},\,$ fully expanded jet velocity (in the exhaust plume)
$V_\text{a},\,$ aircraft flight velocity

Rearranging the equation, specific thrust is given by:

$$\frac{F_\text{n}}{\dot{m}} = V_\text{jfe} - V_\text{a}$$

So for zero flight velocity, specific thrust is directly proportional to jet velocity.

The Rolls-Royce/Snecma Olympus 593 in Concorde had a high specific thrust in supersonic cruise and at dry take-off. This made the engines noisy. The problem was compounded by the need for a modest amount of afterburning (reheat) at take-off (and transonic acceleration).

== Concepts ==
=== Tandem fan ===
One SST VCE concept is the tandem fan engine. The engine has two fans, both mounted on the low-pressure shaft, separated by a significant axial gap. The engine operates in series mode while cruising and parallel mode while take-off, climb-out, approach, and final-descent.

In series mode, air enters in the front of the engine. After passing through the front fan, the air passes directly into the second fan, so that the engine behaves much like a turbofan.

In parallel mode, air leaving the front fan exits the engine through an auxiliary nozzle on the underside of the nacelle, skipping the rear fan. Intakes on each side of the engine open to capture air and send it directly to the rear fan and the rest of the engine. Parallel mode substantially increases the total air accelerated by the engine, lowering the velocity of the air and accompanying noise.

In the 1970s, Boeing modified a Pratt & Whitney JT8D to use a tandem fan configuration and successfully demonstrated the switch from series to parallel operation (and vice versa) with the engine running, albeit at partial power.

=== Mid-tandem fan ===
In the mid-tandem fan concept, a high specific flow single stage fan is located between the high pressure (HP) and low pressure (LP) compressors of a turbojet core. Only bypass air passes through the fan. The LP compressor exit flow passes through passages within the fan disc, directly underneath the fan blades. Some bypass air enters the engine via an auxiliary intake. During take-off and approach the engine behaves much like a conventional turbofan, with an acceptable jet noise level (i.e., low specific thrust). However, for supersonic cruise, the fan variable inlet guide vanes and auxiliary intake close to minimize bypass flow and increase specific thrust. In this mode the engine acts more like a 'leaky' turbojet (e.g. the F404).

=== Mixed-flow turbofan ejector ===
In the mixed-flow turbofan with ejector concept, a low bypass ratio engine is mounted in front of a long tube, called an ejector. The ejector reduces noise. It is deployed during take-off and approach. Turbofan exhaust gases send air into the ejector via an auxiliary air intake, thereby reducing the specific thrust/mean jet velocity of the final exhaust. The mixed-flow design is not particularly efficient at low speed, but is considerably simpler.

=== Three stream ===
The three-stream architecture adds a third, directable air stream. This stream bypasses the core when fuel efficiency is required or through the core for greater power. Under the Versatile Affordable Advanced Turbine Engines (VAATE) program, the U.S Air Force and industry partners developed this concept under the Adaptive Versatile Engine Technology (ADVENT) and the follow-on Adaptive Engine Technology Demonstrator (AETD) and Adaptive Engine Transition Program (AETP) programs. Examples include the General Electric XA100 and the Pratt & Whitney XA101, as well as the propulsion system for the Next Generation Air Dominance (NGAD) fighter.

=== Double bypass ===
General Electric developed a variable cycle engine, known as the GE37 or General Electric YF120, for the YF-22/YF-23 fighter aircraft competition, in the late 1980s. GE used a double bypass/hybrid fan arrangement, but never disclosed how they exploited the concept. The Air Force instead selected the conventional Pratt & Whitney F119 for what became the Lockheed Martin F-22 Raptor.

=== Other geared turbofans ===
Geared turbofans are also used in the following engines, some still in development: Garrett TFE731, Lycoming ALF 502/LF 507, Pratt & Whitney PW1000G, Turbomeca Astafan, and Turbomeca Aspin, and Aviadvigatel PD-18R.

=== Rolls Royce Ultrafan ===
The Rolls Royce Ultrafan is the largest and most efficient engine to allow multiple turbine speeds. The turbines behind the main fan are small and allow more air to pass straight through, while a planetary gearbox "allows the main fan to spin slower and the compressors to spin faster, putting each in their optimal zones."

=== Turboelectric ===
Startup Astro Mechanica is developing what it calls a turboelectric-adaptive jet engine that shifts from turbofan to turbojet to ramjet mode as it accelerates from a standing start to a projected Mach 6. This is achieved by using a dual turbine approach. One turbine acts as an turbogenerator. The second turbine acts as the propulsion unit. The turbogenerator powers an electric motor that controls the compressor of the second turbine. The motor can change speeds to keep the fan turning at the ideal RPM for a specific flight mode. In turbojet and ramjet modes, the inlet is narrowed to compress the air and eliminate bypass. The turbogenerator is commercially available, while the propulsion unit is built by the company. A key innovation is that electric motors have dramatically increased their power density so that the weight of the motor is no longer prohibitive.

Instead of a fixed gearbox, it uses an electric motor to turn the turbine(s) behind the fan at an ideal speed for each phase of flight. The company claimed it would support efficient take-off, subsonic, supersonic, and hypersonic speeds. The electric motor is powered by a generator in turn powered by a turbine. The approach relies on the improved power density of novel electric motors such as yokeless dual-rotor axial flux motors that offer far more kw/kg than conventional designs that were too heavy for such an application.

Air flows in through a turbogenerator to produce electric power to power an electric motor. The electric motor adaptively controls the propulsion unit, allowing it to behave like a turbofan, turbojet, or ramjet depending on airspeed. In effect the engine can operate at any point along the specific impulse (Isp) curve - high Isp at low speed or low Isp at high speed.

It is in some respects similar to turbo-electric marine engines that allow propellers to turn at a different speed than the steam turbines that power them.

== See also ==
- Index of aviation articles
