= Pratt & Whitney F135 =

Afterburning turbofan aircraft engine

F135
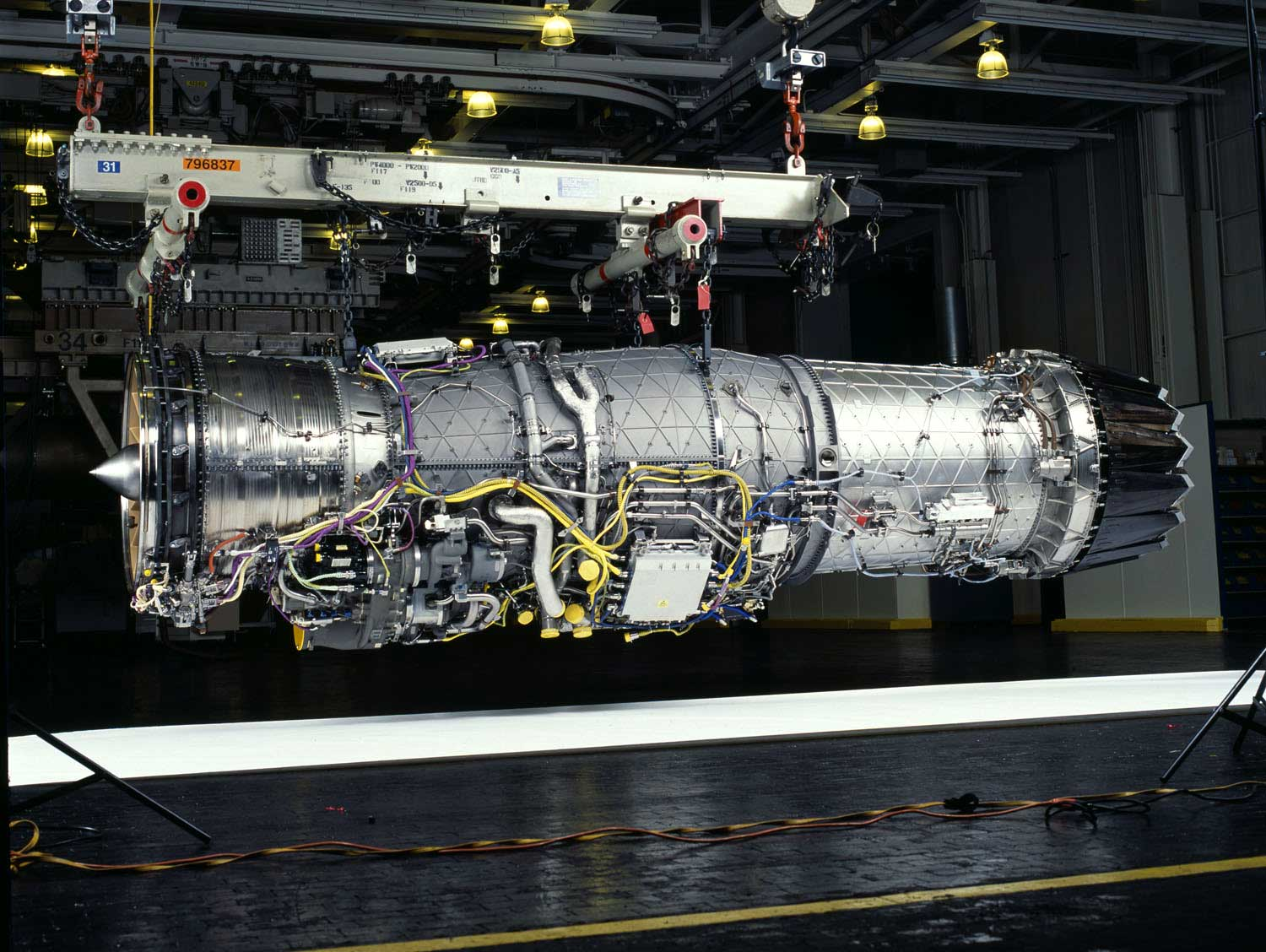
- F135 engine during the JSF System Development and Demonstration (SDD) phase
- Type: Turbofan
- National origin: United States
- Manufacturer: Pratt & Whitney
- Major applications: Lockheed Martin F-35 Lightning II
- Developed from: Pratt & Whitney F119

The Pratt & Whitney F135 is an afterburning turbofan developed for the Lockheed Martin F-35 Lightning II, a single-engine strike fighter. It has two variants; a Conventional Take-Off and Landing (CTOL) variant used in the F-35A and F-35C, and a two-cycle Short Take-Off Vertical Landing (STOVL) variant used in the F-35B that includes a forward lift fan. The first production engines were delivered in 2009.

Developed from the Pratt & Whitney F119 engine used on the F-22 Raptor, the F135 produces around 28,000 pounds-force (125 kN) of thrust and 43,000 pounds-force (191 kN) with afterburner. The F135 competed with the General Electric/Rolls-Royce F136 to power the F-35.

== Development ==
The F135 originated with Lockheed Corporation Skunk Works, with efforts to develop a stealthy STOVL strike fighter for the U.S. Marine Corps under a 1986 DARPA project under the auspices of the Advanced STOVL (ASTOVL) program, an early progenitor of the Joint Strike Fighter (JSF) that resulted in the F-35. Lockheed engineer Paul Bevilaqua developed and eventually patented a concept aircraft and a propulsion system called the Shaft-Driven Lift Fan (SDLF), and then turned to Pratt & Whitney (P&W) to build a demonstrator engine. The ground test demonstrator used the first stage fan from a F119 engine for the lift fan. The engine fan and core from the F100-PW-220 were used for the core of the demonstrator engine, and the larger low-pressure turbine from the F100-PW-229 was used for the low-pressure turbine of the demonstrator engine. The larger turbine was used to provide the additional power required to operate the lift fan through the low-pressure spool shaft, which would be engaged by a clutch in STOVL mode. Finally, a variable thrust deflecting nozzle was added to complete the "F100-229-Plus" demonstrator engine. (Note: Other STOVL concepts explored under ASTOVL included Lift-Plus-Lift/Cruise (LPLC) by Northrop Grumman which had a separate dedicated lift engine, Gas-Driven Lift Fan (GDLF) by McDonnell Douglas that used the main engine bleed air to power a lift fan, and further developments of direct lift thrust vectoring similar to the Harrier's Pegasus engine.) This ground demonstrator engine proved the shaft-driven lift fan concept and led to the development of the eventual JSF engine.

ASTOVL continued under the Common Affordable Lightweight Fighter (CALF) program in 1993 before eventually being merged into the Joint Advanced Strike Technology (JAST), which was renamed JSF in 1995; under the JSF program, contracts for flightworthy concept demonstrator aircraft were awarded in 1996 to Lockheed Martin and Boeing for the air vehicle designs and P&W for the initial propulsion system. (Note: In the initial plans, all early JSFs were to be powered by an engine derived from Pratt & Whitney's F119 turbofan intended for the F-22 Advanced Tactical Fighter (ATF), but it was planned that engine contracts would be competitively tendered from Lot 6 onward with General Electric/Allison Engine Company/Rolls-Royce developing a YF120-derived engine (eventually designated F136) as a competitor.) P&W developed the JSF engine from their F119 turbofan, which powers the F-22 Raptor, as the "F119-JSF". A flightworthy prototype system that incorporated the shaft-driven lift fan, designated "YF119-PW-611", was tested on the Lockheed Martin X-35 concept demonstrator aircraft and first flew in 2000. P&W also made another prototype, the "YF119-PW-614", for the competing Boeing X-32 which had direct lift system. In flight tests, the X-35B was able to demonstrate STOVL by taking off in 500 ft (150 m), then flew supersonic before landing vertically. The X-35 concept beat the X-32 for the JSF competition and the YF119-611 would form the basis for the F135, which integrates the F119 core with new components optimized for the JSF.

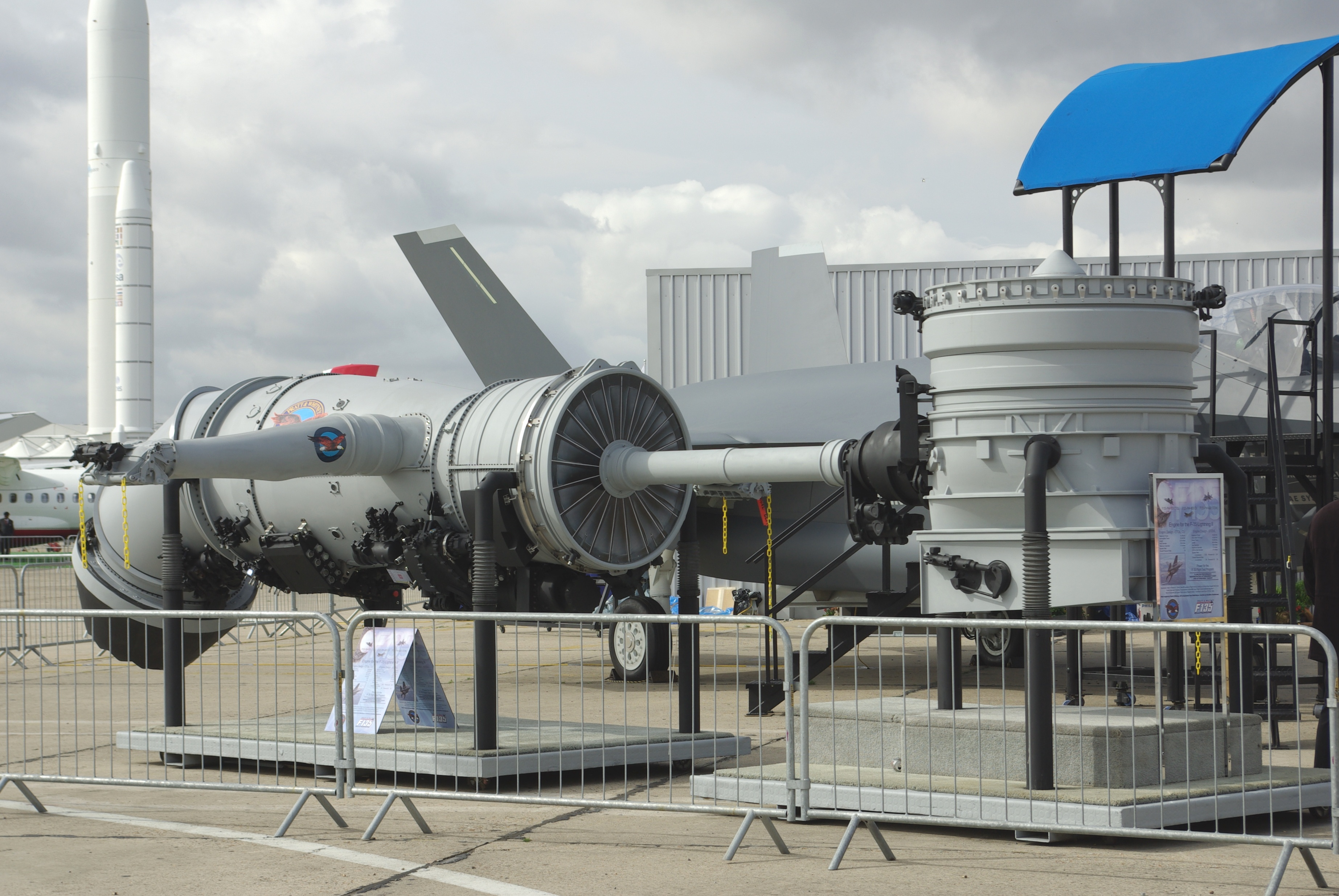
The F135-PW-600 engine mockup with lift fan, roll posts, and rear vectoring nozzle, as designed for the F-35B V/STOL variant, at the Paris Air Show, 2007

The F135 team is made up of Pratt & Whitney, Rolls-Royce and Hamilton Sundstrand. Pratt & Whitney is the prime contractor for the main engine, and systems integration. Rolls-Royce is responsible for the vertical lift system for the STOVL aircraft. Hamilton Sundstrand is responsible for the electronic engine control system, actuation system, PMAG, gearbox, and health monitoring systems. Woodward, Inc. is responsible for the fuel system. The F135 is assembled at a plant in Middletown, Connecticut. Some parts of the engine are made in Longueuil, Quebec, Canada, and in Poland. The first production propulsion system for operational service was scheduled for delivery in 2007 with the purpose of serving the U.S., UK, and other international customers. The initial F-35s went into production with the F135 engines, but the GE/Rolls-Royce team planned to develop a replacement F136 engine in July 2009. In 2010, the Pentagon planned for the two propulsion systems to be competitively tendered. However, since 2006 the Defense Department has not requested funding for the alternate F136 engine program, but Congress has maintained program funding.

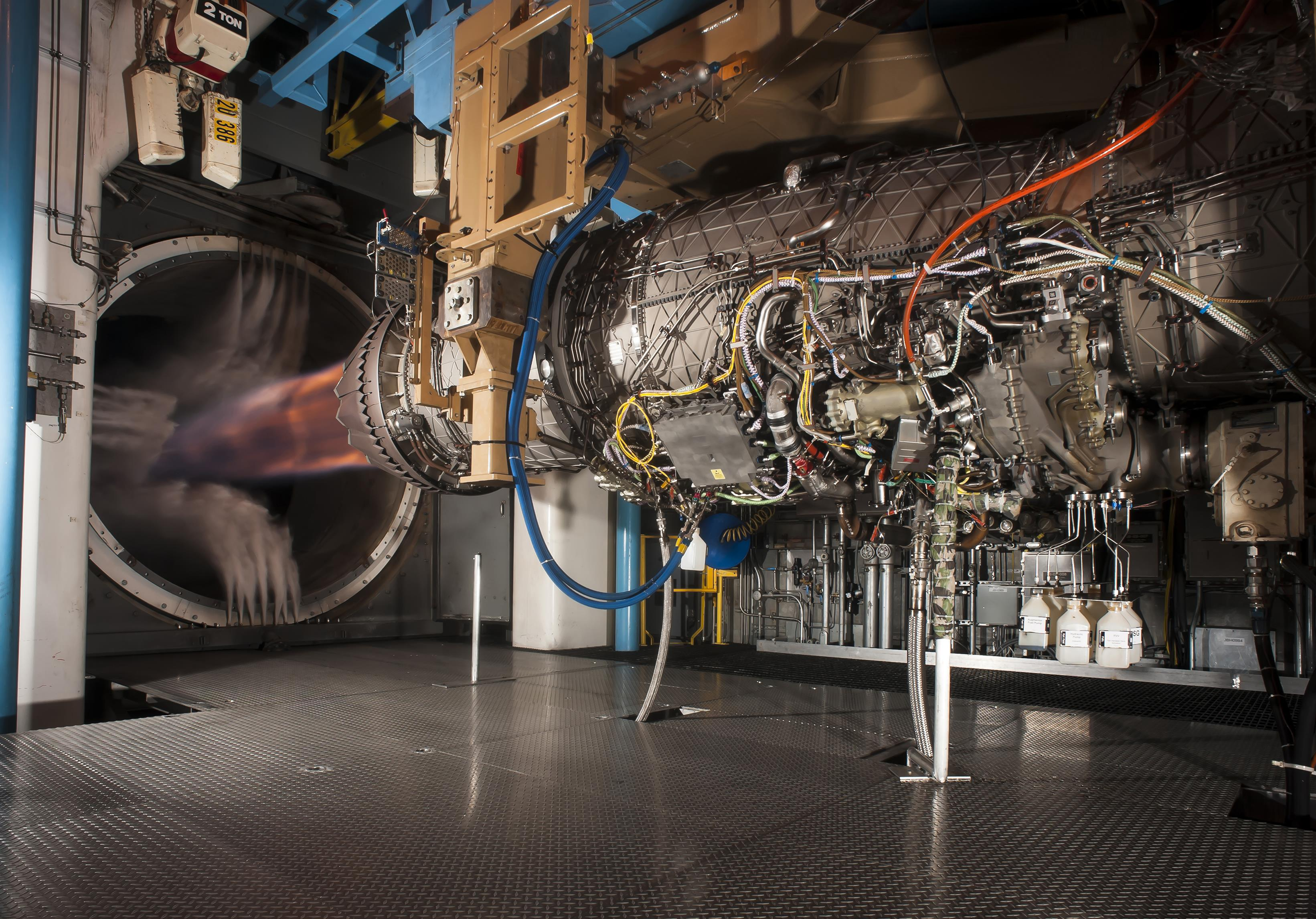
An F135-PW-100 powerplant being tested at Arnold Engineering Development Complex (AEDC)

As of 2009, P&W developed a more durable version of the F135 engine to increase the service life of key parts. The life expectancy of the parts was reduced because the hot sections of the engine (combustor and high-pressure turbine blades specifically) ran hotter than expected. The test engine is designated XTE68/LF1, and testing is expected to begin in 2010. This redesign has caused "substantial cost growth".

P&W expected to deliver the F135 below the cost of the F119, even though it was a more powerful engine. However, in February 2013 a cracked turbine blade was found during a scheduled inspection. The crack was caused by operating at high turbine temperatures for longer periods than usual. In December 2013 the hollow first stage fan blisk failed at 77% of its expected life during a ground test. It was to be replaced by a solid part adding 6 lb (2.7 kg) in weight. In 2013, a former P&W employee was caught attempting to ship "numerous boxes" of sensitive information about the F135 to Iran.

Despite the troubles, the 100th engine was delivered in 2013. LRIP-6 was agreed in 2013 for $1.1 billion for 38 engines of various types, which helped to decrease the unit cost.

Air Force Lt. Gen. Christopher C. Bogdan, the executive officer of the F-35 program, has called out P&W for falling short on manufacturing quality of the engines and slow deliveries. His deputy director Rear Admiral Randy Mahr said that P&W stopped their cost-cutting efforts after "they got the monopoly". In 2013 the price of the F135 increased by $4.3 billion.

In May 2014, Pratt & Whitney discovered conflicting documentation about the origin of titanium material used in some of its engines, including the F135. The company assessed that the uncertainty did not pose a risk to safety of flight but suspended engine deliveries as a result. Bogdan supported P&W's actions and said the problem was now with A&P Alloys, the supplier. The US Defense Contract Management Agency wrote in June 2014 that Pratt & Whitney's "continued poor management of suppliers is a primary driver for the increased potential problem notifications." A&P Alloys stated that they stood behind their product even though they were not given access to the parts to do their own testing. Tracy Miner, an attorney with Boston-based Demeo LLP representing A&P Alloys said, "it is blatantly unfair to destroy A&P’s business without allowing A&P access to the materials in question"

In July 2014 there was an uncontained failure of a fan rotor while the aircraft was preparing for take-off. The parts passed through a fuel tank and caused a fire, grounding the F-35 fleet. During high g-force maneuvering three weeks before the flight, flexing of the engine caused excessive rubbing at the seal between the fan blisk and the fan stator initiating the impending failure. The rub caused a temperature of over 1,000 °C (1,900 °F), well beyond the material limit of 540 °C (1,000 °F). Micro cracks appeared in third-stage fan blades, according to program manager Christopher Bogdan, causing blades to separate from the disk. The failed blades punctured a fuel tank and hot air mixing with fuel caused the fire. As a short term fix, each aircraft is flown on a specific flight profile to allow the rotor seal to wear a mating groove in the stator to prevent excessive rubbing.

Pratt & Whitney managed to meet their 2015 production goals, but "recurring manufacturing quality issues" in turbine blades and electronic control systems required engines to be pulled from the fleet.

== Design ==
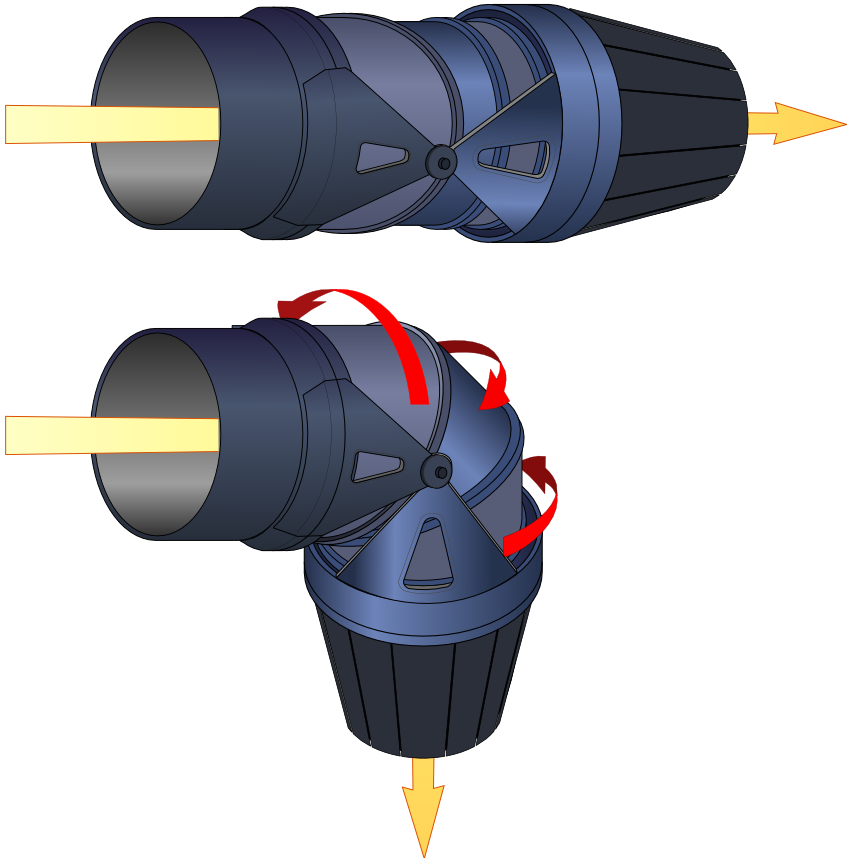
Thrust vectoring nozzle of the F135-PW-600 STOVL variant

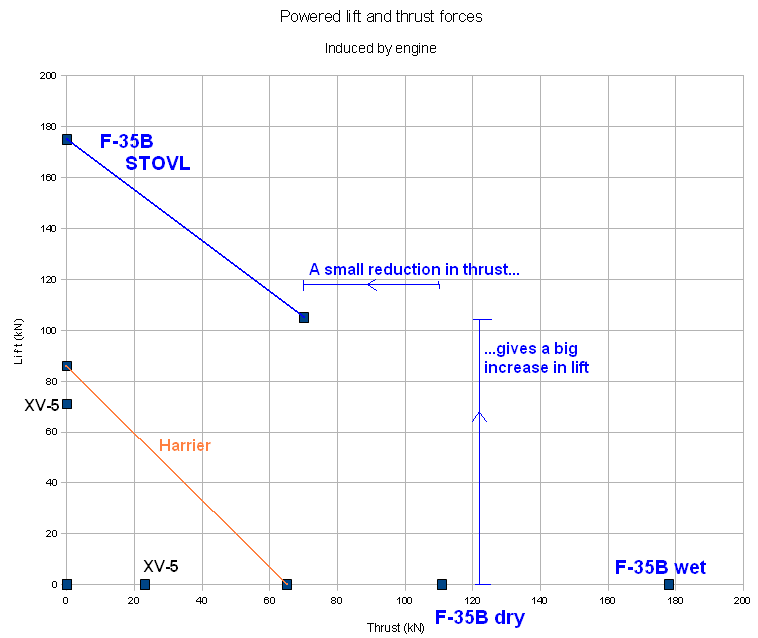
Diagram of F-35B and smaller powered lift aircraft

Derived from the F119 engine, the F135 is a mixed-flow afterburning turbofan utilizing a similar core as the F119 with a new fan and LP turbine. There are two F135 variants: the -100 and the -600 versions. A -400 version is mentioned, similar to the -100, the main difference being the use of salt-corrosion resistant materials. The -600 is described below with an explanation of the engine configuration changes that take place for hovering. The engine and Rolls-Royce LiftSystem make up the Integrated Lift Fan Propulsion System (ILFPS).

The vertical thrust for the STOVL version is obtained from a two-stage lift fan (about 46%) in front of the engine, a vectoring exhaust nozzle (about 46%), and a nozzle in each wing using fan air from the bypass duct (about 8%). These contributions to the total lift are based on thrust values of 18,680 lbf (83.1 kN), 18,680 lbf (83.1 kN) and 3,290 lbf (14.6 kN) respectively. Another source gives thrust values of 20,000 lbf (89 kN), 18,000 lbf (80 kN), and 3,900 lbf (17 kN) respectively.

In this configuration most of the bypass flow is ducted to the wing nozzles, known as roll posts. Some is used for cooling the rear exhaust nozzle, known as the 3-bearing swivel duct nozzle (3BSD). At the same time an auxiliary inlet is opened on top of the aircraft to provide additional air to the engine with low distortion during the hover.

The low pressure (LP) turbine drives the lift fan through a shaft extension on the front of the LP rotor and a clutch. The engine operates as a separate flow turbofan with a higher bypass ratio. The power to drive the fan—about 30,000 shp (22,000 kW)—is obtained from the LP turbine by increasing the hot nozzle area.

A higher bypass ratio increases the thrust for the same engine power as a fundamental consequence of transferring power from a small diameter propelling jet to a larger diameter one. When the F135 is providing vertical lift using the increased bypass ratio from the lift fan, the thrust augmentation is 50% with no increase in fuel flow. Thrust augmentation is 52% in conventional flight when using the afterburner, but with a large increase in fuel flow.

The transfer of approximately 1/3 of the power available for hot nozzle thrust to the lift fan reduces the temperature and velocity of the rear lift jet impinging on the ground. The F-35 can achieve a limited 100% throttle cruise without afterburners of Mach 1.2 for 150 miles (240 km; 130 nmi).

Like the F119, the F135 has a stealthy augmentor where traditional spray bars and flameholders are replaced by thick curved vanes coated with ceramic radar-absorbent materials (RAM). Afterburner fuel injectors are integrated into these vanes, which block line-of-sight of the turbines, contributing to aft-sector stealth. The axisymmetric nozzle consists of fifteen partially overlapping flaps that create a sawtooth pattern at the trailing edge. This creates shed vortices and reduces the infrared signature of the exhaust plume. The effectiveness is reportedly comparable to that of the F119's wedge nozzles, while being substantially more cost effective and lower maintenance.

The engine uses thermoelectric-powered sensors to monitor turbine bearing health.

Improving engine reliability and ease of maintenance is a major objective for the F135. The engine has fewer parts than similar engines, which improves reliability. All line-replaceable components (LRCs) can be removed and replaced with a set of six common hand tools. The F135's health management system is designed to provide real time data to maintainers on the ground. This allows them to troubleshoot problems and prepare replacement parts before the aircraft returns to base. According to Pratt & Whitney, this data may help drastically reduce troubleshooting and replacement time, as much as 94% over legacy engines.

=== Planned improvements ===
Prior to any services issuing a requirement for an upgraded engine, Pratt and Whitney had cooperated with the US Navy on a two-block improvement plan for the F135 engine. The goals of Block 1 are a 7–10% increase in thrust and a 5–7% lower fuel burn. The plans include better cooling technology for turbine blades; this would increase the longevity of the engine and substantially reduce maintenance costs. The goal of Block 2 is to work with the US Air Force's Adaptive Engine Transition Program, with the intention of introducing technology for an engine rated at 45,000 lb of thrust, to be used in a sixth-generation fighter.

Pratt & Whitney's upgrade path for the F135 would change several times, with Block 1 and 2 initially becoming Growth Option 1 and 2. At the end of May 2017 Pratt and Whitney announced the F135 Growth Option 1 had finished testing and was available for production. The upgrade requires the changing of the power module on older engines during depot overhaul and can be seamlessly inserted into future production engines at a minimal increase in unit cost and no impact to delivery schedule. The Growth Option 1 offers an improvement of 6–10% thrust across the F-35 flight envelope while also getting a 5–6% fuel burn reduction. In June 2018, United Technologies, parent company of P&W, announced Growth Option 2.0 to help provide increased power and thermal management system (PTMS) capacity, providing options for operators for instance if they are wishing to upgrade to heavier weapons. Although Growth Option 2.0 was initially envisaged as a further development of the F135 with an adaptive fan to become the XA101, a three-stream adaptive cycle engine, Pratt & Whitney has since split the XA101 as an entirely separate design with a new core, while Growth Option 1.0 would evolve to become the F135 Engine Enhancement Package (EEP), later renamed Engine Core Upgrade (ECU). In 2023, the USAF chose to fund the ECU for further development and fielding by 2029 to support the F-35's Block IV upgrade.

== Variants ==
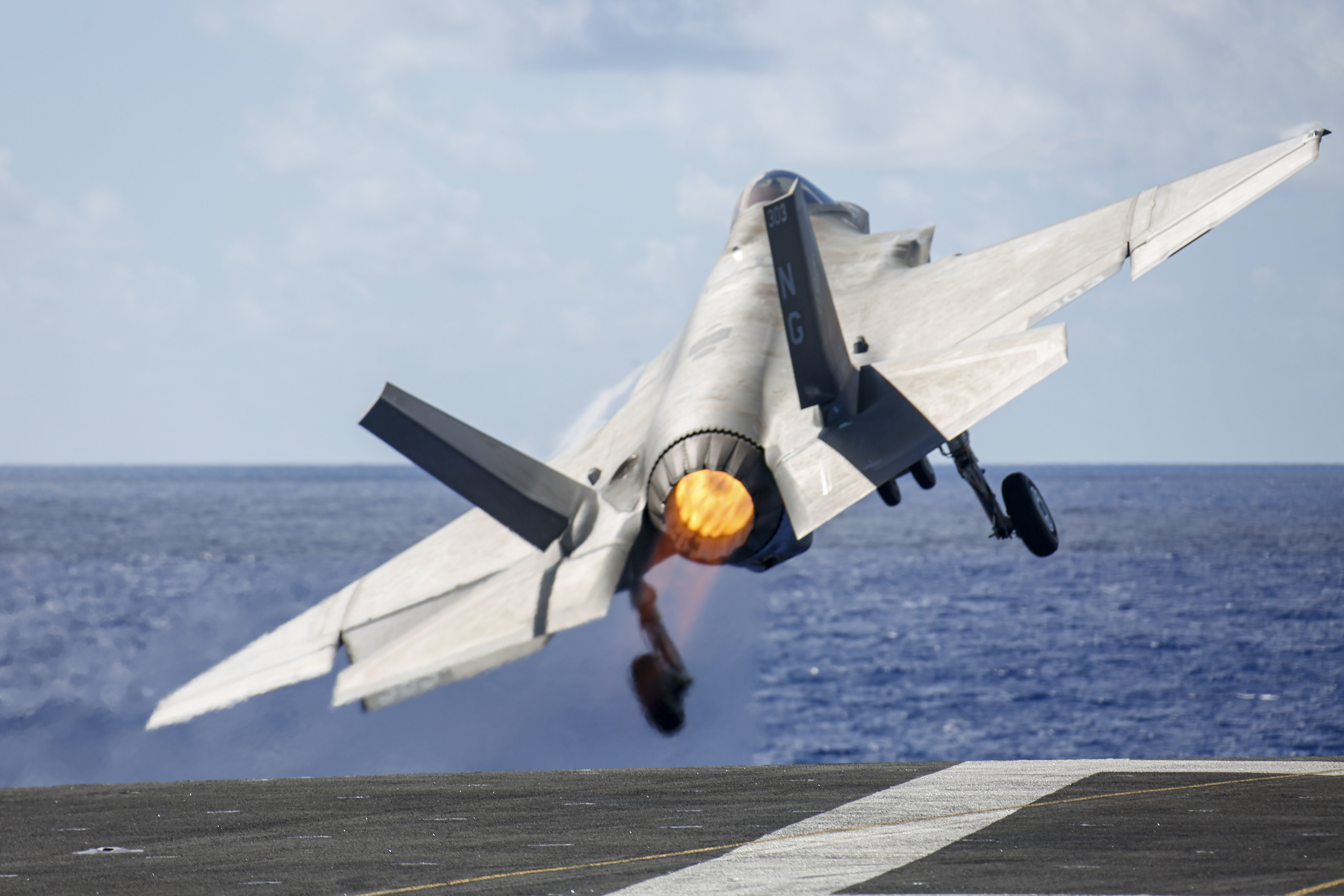
A United States Navy F-35C taking off from USS Abraham Lincoln with afterburner.

- F135-PW-100/400: Used in the F-35A Conventional Take-Off and Landing (CTOL) and F-35C naval (CV) variants; the naval variant incorporates salt-corrosion resistant materials
- F135-PW-600: Used in the F-35B Short Take-Off Vertical Landing (STOVL) variant

== Applications ==
- Lockheed Martin F-35 Lightning II

== Specifications (F135) ==
=== F135-PW-100/400 ===
Data from Pratt & Whitney, Technical Order TO-00-85-20, American Society of Mechanical Engineers, Key Publishing

==== General characteristics ====
- Type: Two-spool, axial flow, augmented turbofan
- Length: 220 in (5,590 mm)
- Diameter: 46 in (1,170 mm) max., 43 in (1,090 mm) at the fan inlet
- Dry weight: 6,422 lb (2,910 kg)

==== Components ====
- Compressor: 3-stage fan, 6-stage high-pressure compressor
- Combustors: annular combustor
- Turbine: 1-stage high-pressure turbine, 2-stage low-pressure turbine
- Bypass ratio: 0.57:1

==== Performance ====
- Maximum thrust:
  - 28,000 lbf (125 kN) military thrust
  - 43,000 lbf (191 kN) with afterburner (Note: 51,000 lbf (227 kN) with afterburner on uninstalled basis (without shaft horsepower and bleed air being extracted from the engine))
- Overall pressure ratio: 28:1
- Turbine inlet temperature: 3,600 °F (1,980 °C; 2,260 K)
- Thrust-to-weight ratio: 4.36:1 military thrust, 6.70:1 augmented

=== F135-PW-600 ===
Data from Pratt & Whitney, TO-00-85-20, American Society of Mechanical Engineers

==== General characteristics ====
- Type: Two-spool, axial flow, augmented turbofan with shaft driven remote lift fan
- Length: 369 in (9,370 mm)
- Diameter: 46 in (1,170 mm) maximum, 43 in (1,090 mm) fan inlet, 53 in (1,350 mm) lift fan inlet
- Dry weight: 7,260 lb (3,290 kg)

==== Components ====
- Compressor: 3 stage fan, 6 stage high-pressure compressor, 2 stage, contra-rotating, shaft driven lift fan
- Combustors: annular combustor
- Turbine: Single stage high pressure turbine, 2-stage low pressure turbine
- Bypass ratio: 0.56:1 conventional, 0.51:1 powered lift

==== Performance ====
- Maximum thrust:
  - 27,000 lbf (120 kN) military thrust
  - 41,000 lbf (182 kN) with afterburner
  - 40,650 lbf (181 kN) hovering
- Overall pressure ratio: 28:1 (conventional), 29:1 (powered lift),
- Turbine inlet temperature: 3,600 °F (1,980 °C; 2,260 K)

== See also ==
- Rolls-Royce LiftSystem

Related development

- Pratt & Whitney F119

Comparable engines

- General Electric/Rolls-Royce F136

Related lists

- List of aircraft engines
