= Transpiration cooling =

Thermodynamic process

Transpiration cooling is a thermodynamic process where cooling is achieved by a process of moving a liquid or a gas through the wall of a structure to absorb some portion of the heat energy from the structure while simultaneously actively reducing the convective and radiative heat flux coming into the structure from the surrounding space.

One approach to transpiration cooling is to move liquid through small pores in the outer wall of a body leading to evaporation of the liquid to a gas via the physical mechanism of evaporative cooling. Other approaches are possible.

== Applications ==
Transpiration cooling is used in the aerospace industry, in jet and rocket engines. In 2018, researchers at the University of Oxford were experimentally testing transpiration cooling as a Thermal Protection System for Hypersonic Vehicles such as rockets or spaceplanes.

Transpiration cooling is one of a variety of cooling techniques that may be used to reduce regenerative cooling loads in rocket engines and subsequently reduce propellant requirements. Other techniques exist, such as film cooling, ablative cooling, radiative cooling, heat sink cooling and dump cooling.

Transpiration cooling is being considered for use in space vehicles reentering the Earth's atmosphere at hypersonic velocities where a transpirationally cooled outer skin could serve as a part of the thermal protection system of the reentering spacecraft. SpaceX publicly mentioned such a system in 2019 for use on their Starship reusable second stage and orbital spacecraft to mitigate the harsh conditions of reentry. The design concept envisioned a double stainless-steel skin, with active coolant flowing between the two layers, with some areas additionally containing multiple small pores that would allow for transpiration cooling. After design and testing in terrestrial labs, SpaceX subsequently stated that although an alternative heat mitigation approach—using low-cost ceramic tiles on the windward side of Starship—was being developed, transpiration cooling could be used in some areas. Few details on the design are expected to be publicly released, as US law prevents SpaceX from releasing such information.

== See also ==
- Evapotranspiration
