= Adaptive Versatile Engine Technology =

US aircraft engine development program

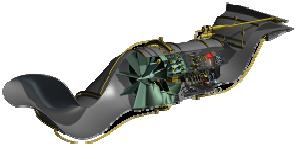
Cut-away view of a prospective ADVENT engine

The Adaptive Versatile Engine Technology (ADVENT) program was an aircraft engine development program run by the United States Air Force with the goal of developing an efficient adaptive cycle, or variable cycle engine for next generation military aircraft; the technology is designed to be scalable, with initial demonstrators expected to be in the 20,000 lbf (89 kN) thrust class.

In 2012 the program was succeeded by the Adaptive Engine Technology Demonstrator (AETD) program; work continued in 2016 under the Adaptive Engine Transition Program (AETP), which focused on developing and testing a 45,000 lbf (200 kN) thrust class adaptive cycle engine for potential re-engining of the tri-service F-35 multirole strike fighter. A subsequent Next Generation Adaptive Propulsion (NGAP) program was also launched for a related 35,000 lbf (156 kN) thrust class engine to power F-47 crewed air superiority fighter as part of the Next Generation Air Dominance family of systems.

== Objective ==
The objective of ADVENT is to develop an engine that is optimized for several design points, rather than the traditional single point. Instead of having an engine that is designed solely for high speed (like many current fighter engines are) or for high fuel efficiency (like many current commercial engines are), the final ADVENT engine would be designed to operate at both those conditions. Specific goals include reducing average fuel consumption by 25% and reducing the temperature of cooling air produced by the engine.

== Applications ==
The ADVENT engine was originally targeted at the Air Force's 2018 Next-Generation Bomber, but uncertainty in that program has led Rolls-Royce (RR), one of the primary developers involved with the project, to predict that the ADVENT engine will be better suited for a potential 2020 engine upgrade for the F-35 Lightning II. RR, who is partnered with GE Aviation on the embattled F136 alternate engine for the F-35, has suggested that the ADVENT development contracts are all the more reason to continue the F136, as any engine upgrade from Pratt & Whitney (makers of the F135 engine currently used in the F-35) would have to be separately funded, either internally or to additional government cost.

== History ==
The ADVENT program is one of several related development projects being pursued under the Air Force's Versatile Affordable Advanced Turbine Engine (VAATE) program. After being announced in April 2007, Rolls-Royce and GE Aviation were awarded Phase I contracts in August 2007 to explore concepts, develop and test critical components, and begin preliminary designs of an engine.

In October 2009, Rolls-Royce was awarded the Phase II contract to continue component testing and integrate the developed technologies into a technology demonstrator engine. GE Aviation was also awarded funds to continue development of their technology demonstration core, which was unexpected as the ADVENT program had originally called for a single contractor to be selected for Phase II.

With the threat of the GE/RR F136, Pratt & Whitney has funded an adaptive fan variant of its F135, that may qualify for the follow-on Adaptive Engine Technology Development (AETD) program under the US Air Force Research Laboratory.

In 2012, GE was chosen to continue its ADVENT work into the AETD program. GE and Pratt & Whitney were selected over Rolls-Royce to continue the AETD program to mature fuel-efficient, high-thrust powerplants. Operational testing of the engine was expected to begin in 2013. Under AETD, GE had set new records with the highest demonstrated compressor and turbine temperatures. In 2017, Pratt wrapped up tests of their three stream engine with a F135 core.

In 2016, the Adaptive Engine Transition Program (AETP) was launched with the goal of developing and testing adaptive engines for the future sixth generation fighter programs, Penetrating Counter Air (PCA) or Next Generation Air Dominance (NGAD) for USAF and F/A-XX for US Navy, as well as potential re-engining of the F-35. The program assigned the new designations XA100 for General Electric's design and XA101 for Pratt & Whitney's. The next generation fighter engine would eventually become separate from the F-35 efforts due to the different optimizations required and was split off into the Next Generation Adaptive Propulsion (NGAP) program. The competing designs for NGAP are the XA102 from General Electric and XA103 from Pratt & Whitney.

== See also ==
- Improved Turbine Engine Program (ITEP)

Related development

- General Electric XA100
- Pratt & Whitney XA101
- General Electric XA102
- Pratt & Whitney XA103

Related lists

- List of aircraft engines
