= Specific thrust =

Specific thrust is the thrust per unit air mass flowrate of a jet engine (e.g. turbojet, turbofan, etc.) and can be calculated by the ratio of net thrust/total intake airflow.

Low specific thrust engines tend to be more efficient of propellant (at subsonic speeds), but also have a lower effective exhaust velocity and lower maximum airspeed. High specific thrust engines are mostly used for supersonic speeds, and high specific thrust engines can achieve hypersonic speeds.

== Low specific thrust engines ==
A civil aircraft turbofan (with high-bypass ratio) typically has a low specific thrust (~30 lbf/(lb/s)) to reduce noise, and to reduce fuel consumption, because a low specific thrust helps to improve specific fuel consumption (SFC). This is usually achieved with a high bypass ratio. Additionally low specific thrust implies a relatively large cross-sectional engine area given its net thrust. Consequently, such aircraft engines are normally located externally, in a separate nacelle or pod, attached to the wing, or the rear fuselage.

== High specific thrust engines ==
By contrast, low-bypass ratio military turbofans often feature high specific thrust (45-110 lbf/(lb/s)), which reduces the engine's cross-sectional area, which more easily accommodates a narrow fuselage, which minimizes drag. A high specific thrust usually results in higher noise levels.

== Maximum airspeed ==
Specific thrust has significant bearing on thrust lapse rate: the low jet velocity associated with a low specific thrust engine implies large reductions in net thrust with increasing flight velocity, which can only be partially offset by throttle changes at rated conditions (e.g. maximum recommended climb rating).

== Supersonic aircraft ==
Supersonic aircraft require high specific thrust engines to reach a high exhaust speed.

== Afterburners ==
Specific thrust has impact upon the performance of afterburning turbofans.

A low (dry) specific thrust engine has a low tailpipe temperature, which means that the temperature rise across the afterburner can be high, boosting thrust. Nevertheless, the afterburning specific thrust is still relatively low. The total fuel flow (main combustor plus afterburner) is fixed by the temperature rise from air intake to nozzle and, for a given airflow and changes little with dry specific thrust. Consequently, the low afterburning thrust implies a high afterburning SFC. However, the dry SFC is low.

The situation is completely reversed for a high (dry) specific thrust.

Consequently, engine designers must select a level of dry specific thrust that is suitable for the application

== See also ==
- Specific impulse/exhaust velocity
- Thrust-to-weight ratio
- Jet engine
