= Next Generation Air Dominance =

American sixth-generation fighter initiative

Next Generation Air Dominance (NGAD)
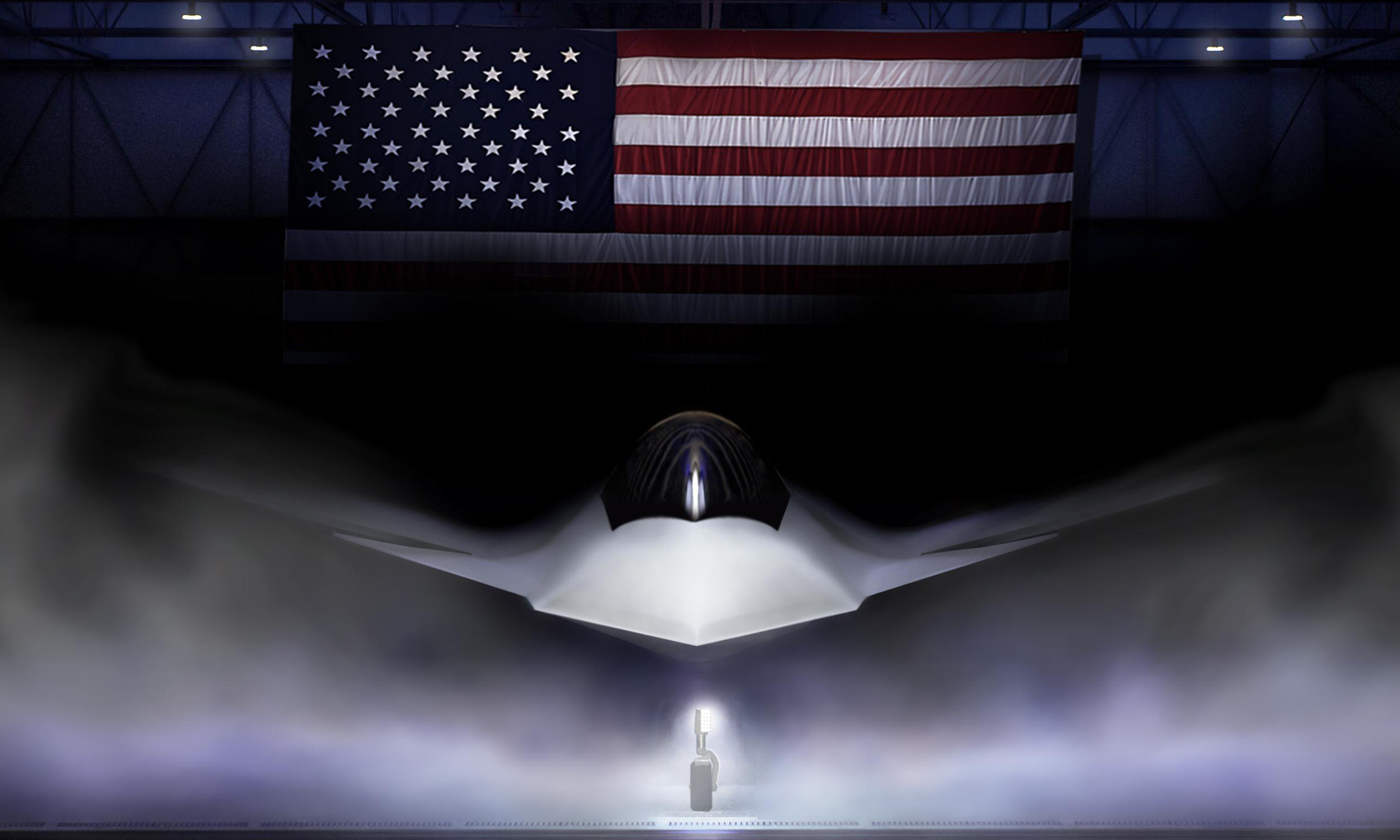
- Artist's rendering of the Boeing F-47, an upcoming sixth-generation jet fighter

General information
- Project for: Air superiority fighter
- Issued by: United States Air Force
- Proposals: Proposals from Boeing and Lockheed Martin

History
- Initiated: 2014 (DARPA Air Dominance Initiative)
- Outcome: Boeing selected to develop and produce the F-47
- Related: Next Generation Adaptive Propulsion (NGAP), F/A-XX program (Navy program)

The Next Generation Air Dominance (NGAD) is a United States Air Force (USAF) initiative that aims to field systems to succeed the Lockheed Martin F-22 Raptor in the air superiority mission. These include a sixth-generation crewed fighter aircraft, dubbed the Penetrating Counter-Air (PCA) platform, and uncrewed collaborative combat aircraft (CCA) operating in a manned-unmanned teaming concept.

After DARPA published its Air Dominance Initiative study in 2014, Air Force and Navy officials began planning for the next generation of air superiority. The services considered a joint NGAD program, but established separate ones instead. (Note: To verbally distinguish between the two programs and their spoken acronyms, the Air Force NGAD is pronounced /ˈɛnɡæd/, while Navy NGAD is pronounced /ˈɛndʒæd/ (the "G" pronounced like a "j").) In March 2025, the Air Force chose the Boeing F-47 as the winning design for the NGAD PCA, and the program began its Engineering and Manufacturing Development (EMD) phase. (Note: This award allows the Air Force officials to maintain multiple air dominance suppliers.) The service expects to buy and field about 200 F-47s in the 2030s, and expects to buy more than 1,000 CCAs: two apiece for each F-47 and F-35A.

== History ==
The NGAD grew out of Defense Advanced Research Project Agency (DARPA) studies of concepts for air superiority systems of the 2030s for the U.S. Air Force and U.S. Navy, particularly its Air Dominance Initiative study published in March 2014. The following year, Defense Department acquisition chief Frank Kendall launched the DARPA-led Aerospace Innovation Initiative (AII) to develop X-plane prototypes to demonstrate technology for future fighter aircraft. In 2016, the USAF released its Air Superiority 2030 (AS 2030) flight plan, which called for a family of systems centered around a crewed aircraft called the Penetrating Counter-Air (PCA). The DARPA AII X-plane prototypes would serve as full-scale flight demonstrators for the PCA.

In 2018, AS 2030 evolved into the NGAD, an effort to develop technologies for air dominance: propulsion, stealth, advanced weapons, digital design (CAD-based engineering), and thermal management of the aircraft signature. The program changes traditional Air Force acquisition by separating design, production, and support functions in the development process, and making use of more frequent industry competitions and simulations in the design and manufacturing process. It was given a $9 billion budget through 2025.

Envisaged as an F-22 successor, the PCA is intended to be a long-range, high-speed, stealthy sensor-shooter aircraft. In particular, NGAD aims to develop a system that addresses the operation needs of the Indo-Pacific theater of operations, where current USAF fighters lack sufficient range and payload. USAF commanders have noted that there may be two variants of NGAD: one with long range and payload for the Indo-Pacific and one more oriented to the relatively short ranges between possible battle areas in Europe. The fighter is expected to use adaptive cycle engines being developed under the Next Generation Adaptive Propulsion (NGAP) program, with the General Electric XA102 and Pratt & Whitney XA103 competing for the propulsion system. The DARPA X-plane demonstrators for the PCA first flew in 2019, and in September 2020, the USAF announced that they had broken records with it.

The crewed PCA fighter component of the NGAD was briefly envisioned to follow the rapid development and procurement cycles of the "Century Series" fighter aircraft of the 1950s and 1960s; dubbed "Digital Century Series" by Assistant Secretary of the Air Force (SAF/AQ) Will Roper, fighter designs would be continually iterated to enable the rapid insertion of new technology and procured in small batches. In May 2021, chief of staff of the USAF General Brown stated that the NGAD will start replacing the F-22 once it is operational in sufficient quantity, with the fielding goal in the 2030s. The F-22 has also been used to test NGAD technology and some advances are expected to be applied to the F-22 as well. The complexity and sophistication of modern aircraft design, however, eventually caused the "Digital Century Series" to be reevaluated compared to a more traditional development and procurement approach, with the debate still ongoing. Furthermore, while the PCA was initially not planned to operate with uncrewed collaborative combat aircraft (CCA), advancements in automation technology has increased the role of CCAs in the USAF force planning; the PCA is now expected to be supported by a variety of complementing "manned, unmanned, optionally manned, cyber, electronic" systems, including uncrewed CCAs to carry extra munitions and perform other missions.

In June 2022, the USAF determined that critical technologies were ready to support the program for Engineering and Manufacturing Development (EMD). In August 2022, the Air Force awarded $975 million to several defense contractors, including Pratt & Whitney and GE Aviation, for prototype engine development.

According to Roper, the first full-scale technology demonstrator prototype of the NGAD crewed fighter aircraft from the AII X-plane program had been flown in 2020, and by 2023, three separate prototypes had flown. The formal solicitation was announced in May 2023, with the goal of source selection in 2024.

On 27 July 2023, Kathy Warden, CEO and President of Northrop Grumman, confirmed that the company notified the U.S. Air Force that it would not bid as a prime contractor for the program, leaving Boeing and Lockheed Martin as the probable two remaining contenders for the main manned fighter component of the program.

In fiscal 2023, the NGAD program received about $1.66 billion, with plans for $11.7 billion more from fiscal 2024 to 2027.

In July 2024, Secretary of the Air Force Frank Kendall announced that the Air Force was "taking a pause" on the crewed component of the NGAD program. “With the platform itself, we’re taking a pause. With the rest of the elements of the air dominance family of systems, we’re moving forward as fast as we can.” Kendall also expressed confidence that the Air Force was "still going to do a sixth-generation crewed aircraft."

Air Force veterans and industry experts have expressed concern with the idea that the B-21 Raider would be able to penetrate a hostile integrated air defense system (IADS) without support from a crewed 6th-gen NGAD fighter. In "Episode 196 – What's Up With NGAD?" on The Aerospace Advantage podcast by the Mitchell Institute, John "JV" Venable, Air Force veteran and Senior Resident Fellow at the Mitchell Institute, said, "This idea that you don't need someone going in and sweeping out the threat in front of a B 21 is absolutely catastrophic."

On September 4, 2024, Air Force Vice Chief of Staff Gen. James Slife reiterated the Air Force's decision to pause the PCA component of the NGAD program, stating that they were "starting at the beginning" with the requirements, according to reporting by The War Zone. "I know what the mission that we have to get done is, but I don’t know that we need to build an airplane to do the mission," said Gen. Slife, referencing the NGAD's status as a system of systems rather than a single crewed fighter.

In December 2024, China revealed two stealth aircraft prototypes, which incited discussion on the then-paused NGAD program. Bryan Clark of the Hudson Institute suggested the Chengdu aircraft could be the potential adversary to NGAD and give American planners incentives to continue the NGAD program.

In March 2025, Air Force leaders announced at the Air & Space Forces Association's (AFA) 2025 Warfare Symposium that the study had validated the need for the NGAD program. Kenneth Wilsbach of the Air Combat Command (ACC) said that crewed sixth-generation aircraft will be necessary to cooperate amid tomorrow's air defenses, electronic warfare systems, and sixth-generation aircraft.

=== Selection ===
On March 21, 2025, the Air Force announced that the NGAD PCA aircraft would be designated F-47 and be designed and built by Boeing under a contract worth more than $20 billion.

The Air Force's fiscal 2025 budget request includes $3.3 billion for NGAD development: $2.7 billion for the manned fighter and $557 million for CCAs.

== See also ==
- Boeing F/A-XX - (United States)
- Chengdu J-36 – (China)
- Shenyang J-50 – (China)
- Future Combat Air System (FCAS) – (France, Spain, Germany)
- Global Combat Air Programme (GCAP) – (Italy, Japan, United Kingdom)
- Mikoyan PAK DP – (Russia)
