= Sukhoi Su-75 Checkmate =

Russian fighter aircraft

Su-75 Checkmate LTA / ЛТС (LTS)
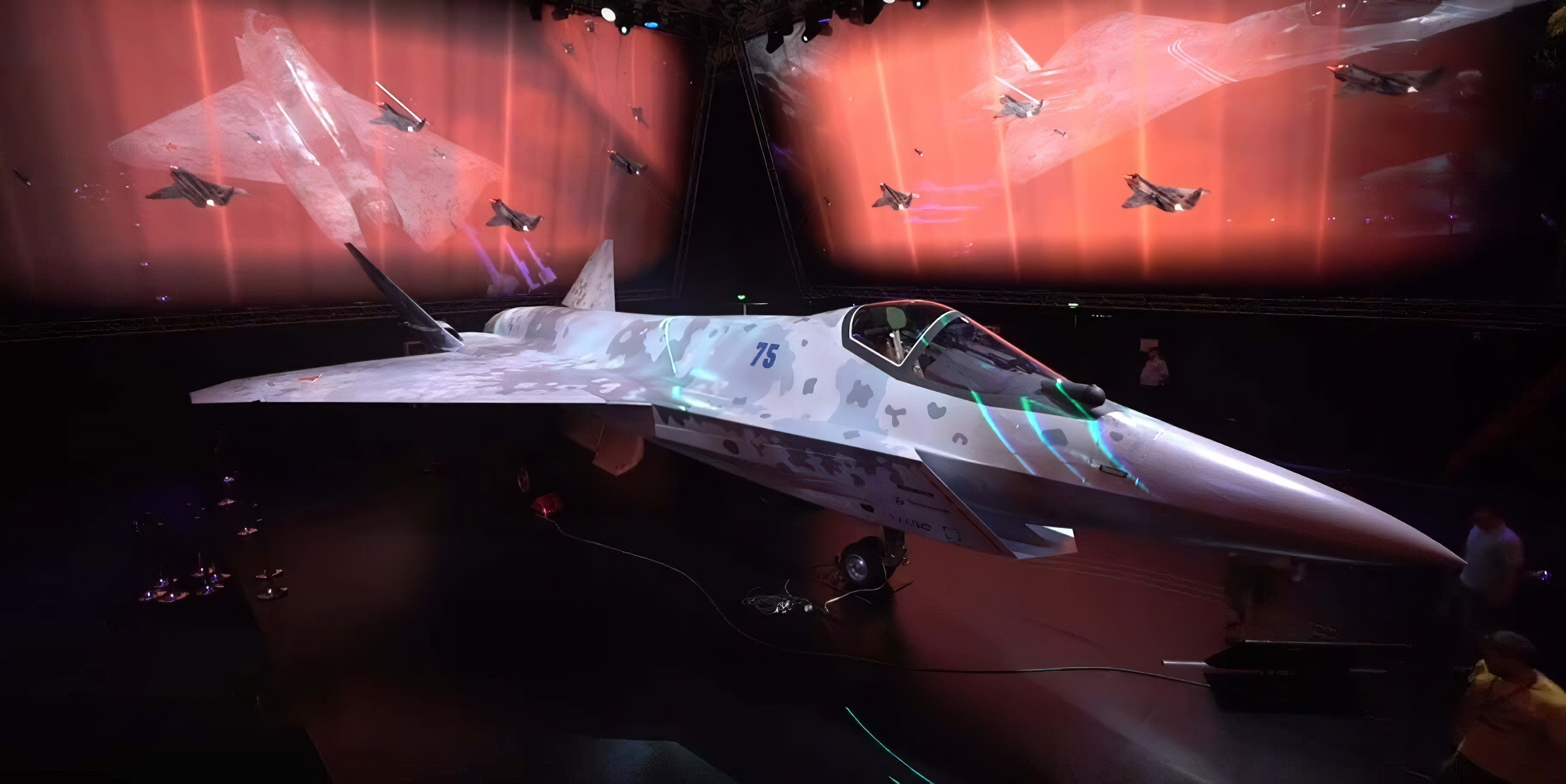
- A static non-flying prototype of the LTA Checkmate at the MAKS Airshow 2021

General information
- Type: Stealth multirole fighter
- National origin: Russia
- Manufacturer: Sukhoi Komsomolsk-on-Amur Aircraft Plant
- Designer: Sukhoi Design Bureau
- Status: Under development

The Sukhoi Su-75 Checkmate (Russian: Сухой Су-75), also designated as the Light Tactical Aircraft (LTA; Russian: Лёгкий Тактический Самолёт - ЛТС, romanized: Lyogkiy Takticheskiy Samolyot - LTS), is a single-engine, stealth fighter aircraft under development by Sukhoi for export and for the Russian Aerospace Forces. The Sukhoi Design Bureau also designates the aircraft as T-75.

== Development ==
A static non-flying prototype was unveiled at the 2021 MAKS air show with President of Russia Vladimir Putin in attendance. The Checkmate's maiden flight was first scheduled for 2023, then delayed to 2024, and again to 2025; with initial deliveries planned for 2026 – 2027. The Checkmate is designed to be low cost for exports, and competes with the Lockheed Martin F-35A Lightning II and Shenyang J-35AE aircraft of the same light to medium-weight category. Production is forecast for 300 planes over 15 years.

According to the chief executive of Rostec, Sergei Chemezov, the LTS Checkmates are expected to cost US $25–30 million each.

Su-75 Checkmate development was delayed due to international sanctions on Russia caused by the Russo-Ukrainian war, whereby Russia could not import semiconductors and high-tech machining equipment from the European Union. The potential export sales also stalled because Russia cannot trade using U.S. dollars.

According to the Center for Security Policy's Maya Carlin in May 2023, sanctions from the war "crippled" the aircraft's development. The United Arab Emirates (UAE) "paused" its participation, which removed "critical" funding.

At the 2025 Dubai Airshow Sergey Bogdan has said that the first flight article is being finalized, and suggested that the first flight will take place in the beginning of 2026. Sergey Chemezov said that first flight will happen in the "nearest future" and that the plane will begin ground testing shortly.

== Design ==
The Su-75 has a diverterless supersonic inlet (DSI), a v-tail and internal weapons bays—all features intended to reduce radar signature. The shape of the inlet, called "U-shape" by its designers, is intended to reduce the aircraft's radar cross-section (RCS) compared to the company's preceding Su-57 design. The wing area appears large, which has been interpreted by correspondent David Axe to imply that Sukhoi designed the fighter to fly and engage in combat at high altitudes—40,000 ft (12,000 m) or higher.

The angular ventral inlet, which wraps around the lower nose section, shares features with a DSI design concept first introduced in the Boeing X-32 aircraft. A diverterless supersonic inlet (DSI) is mechanically simple; DSI can reduce cost compared to more intricate inlet designs such as the McDonnell Douglas F-15 or Sukhoi Su-27. Instead of a conventional empennage, the Su-75 has a v-tail similar to that of Northrop YF-23. Instead of a set of elevators and a tail separately controlling pitch and yaw, a pair of combined ruddervators fulfil both roles. However, ruddervators require more sophisticated flight-control systems than conventional empennages.

According to the jet's designers, the Checkmate is designed to fly with a range of up to 3,000 km (1,864 mi), carry a payload of up to 7,400 kg (16,314 lb), and reach speeds of up to Mach 1.8. The fighter will also feature an internal weapons bay with five missiles and an autocannon.

Patents published in 2023 indicate that the initial design had been modified with changes to the fuselage sides, strakes and the air intakes to reduce radar signature. Mainly, the new design appears to have increased the lifting surface area of the airframe.

=== Engine ===
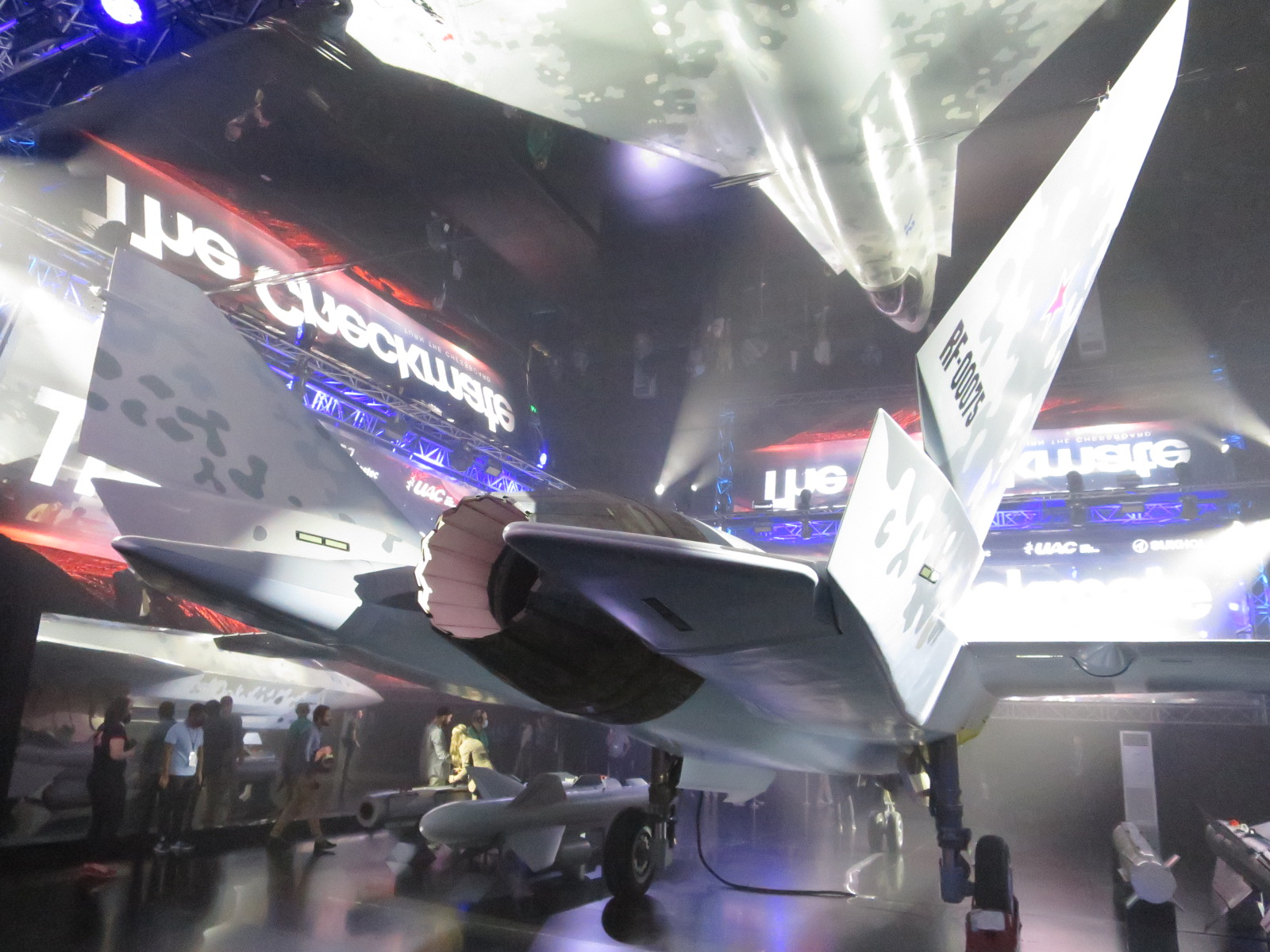
Mock-up of the Checkmate's engine

The powerplant appears to be a variant of the Saturn AL-51F-1 engine (initially known by development designation izdeliye 30) which will also power the Su-57M variant. The AL-51F-1 is designed to be 30% lower specific weight than its AL-41F1 predecessor, and up to 18% more effective, with an estimated thrust of 107.9 kN (24,300 lbf) dry and 161.9 kN (36,400 lbf) in afterburner. Once in series production, the AL-51F-1 will have a much longer life span than other Russian engines. Alternatively, the aircraft may also be powered by the izdeliye 177, a hybrid engine that combines technology from both the AL-41F1 and AL-51F-1 with similar thrust as the latter.

=== Cockpit ===
Due to restrictions preventing taking cockpit photos, NBC News Matt Bodner, the first Western journalist able to see the jet in person, provided a preview without a point of view photo. According to Bodner, the cockpit layout is identical to the Su-57 with a glass cockpit with two 38 cm (15 in) main multi-functional LCD displays similar to the arrangement of the Su-35S. The cockpit has a wide-angle (30° by 22°) head-up display (HUD).

=== Avionics ===
The electronic infrastructure of the Checkmate is all open-architecture and makes use of "Matryoska" diagnostics systems that are mostly on-board. According to Yuri Beliy, the NIIP radar design bureau plans to develop a low-cost AESA radar for the aircraft. According to then-Deputy Prime Minister Yury Borisov, the Checkmate will share the same components and avionics as the Su-57 as a cost-reduction mechanism by the Sukhoi Design Bureau.

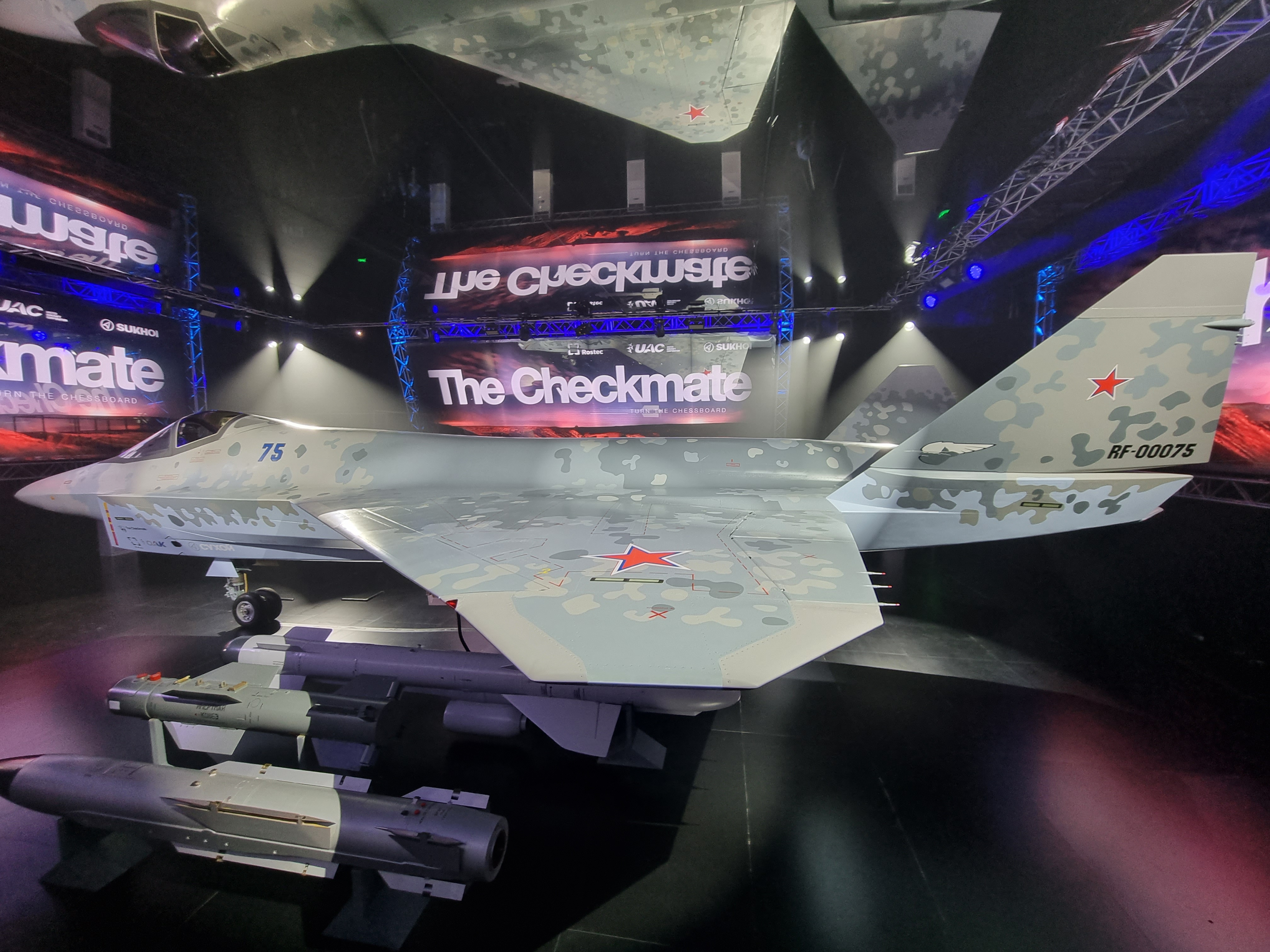
Checkmate's armaments were displayed beside the non-flying prototype airframe

== Potential operators ==
Rostec is anticipating that Argentina, India, Vietnam and Iran will become the primary export destinations for the aircraft, with the African market also showing interest. In 2021 Sukhoi estimated the demand at 300 planes, and aimed to export the Su-75 to African countries over the following 15 years. At the SITDEF-2021 arms show held in Peru, Alexander Mikheev, the General Director of product export of Rosoboronexport, stated that there was interest in the Su-75 in a number of South American countries. In July 2023, Dmitry Shugaev, director of Russia’s Federal Service for Military-Technical Cooperation, confirmed that Nigeria was interested in the design. The jet has also been pitched for export to Turkey, Saudi Arabia and United Arab Emirates. Russia has also expressed interest in India participating in the Su-75 program. Some experts suggest India should consider the Su-75 due to it being a cheaper alternative than other multirole fighters such as the JAS 39 Gripen.

== Specifications ==
Data from Rosoboronexport, Flight Global, Breaking Defense, Suciu, Global security Lieser and Filseth

General characteristics

- Crew: 1
- Length: 17.7 m (58 ft 1 in)
- Wingspan: 11.8 m (38 ft 9 in)
- Height: 4.0 m (13 ft 1 in)
- Max takeoff weight: 26,000 kg (57,320 lb)
- Powerplant: 1 × NPO Saturn AL-51F-1 (derivative) afterburning turbofan, 107.9 kN (24,300 lbf) thrust dry, 161.9 kN (36,400 lbf) with afterburner

Performance

- Maximum speed: Mach 1.8, 1,910 km/h (1,030 kn; 1,190 mph) at high altitude
  - Mach 1.06, 1,300 km/h (702 kn; 808 mph) at sea level
- Range: 2,900 km (1,800 mi, 1,600 nmi)
- Ferry range: 3,000 km (1,900 mi, 1,600 nmi)
- Service ceiling: 16,500 m (54,100 ft)
- g limits: +8.0
- Rate of climb: 220 m/s (43,000 ft/min)
- Thrust/weight: 1.0:1

Armament

- Hardpoints: 5 internal, 6 external with a capacity of 7,400 kilograms (16,300 lb) maximum payload, with provisions to carry combinations of:
  - Missiles: 3 x BVRAAM and 2 x SRAAM stored in the internal weapons bay, 6 × external, 2 × R-77, 3 × R-73, 2 × Kh-35E anti-ship missiles

Avionics

- Sh-121 multifunctional integrated radio electronic system (MIRES)
- Active electronically scanned array
- 101KS-V IRST system

== See also ==
- Mikoyan LMFS
- Mikoyan Project 1.44
- Mikoyan PAK DP

Related development

- Sukhoi Su-57

Aircraft of comparable role, configuration, and era

- Lockheed Martin F-35
- Shenyang J-35
- TAI TF Kaan

Related lists

- List of fighter aircraft
- List of military aircraft of the Soviet Union and the CIS
