= 929th State Flight Test Centre named for V. P. Chkalov =

929th State Flight Test Centre named after V. P. Chkalov
- 929 Государственный лётно-испытательный центр Министерства обороны Российской Федерации имени В. П. Чкалова
- Near Akhtubinsk, Astrakhan Oblast in Russia
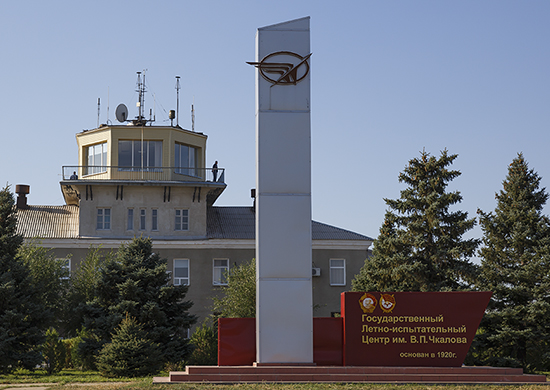

Site information
- Type: Russian Aerospace Forces Base
- Operator: Russian Aerospace Forces
- Condition: Operational

Site history
- Built: 1920
- In use: 1920–present

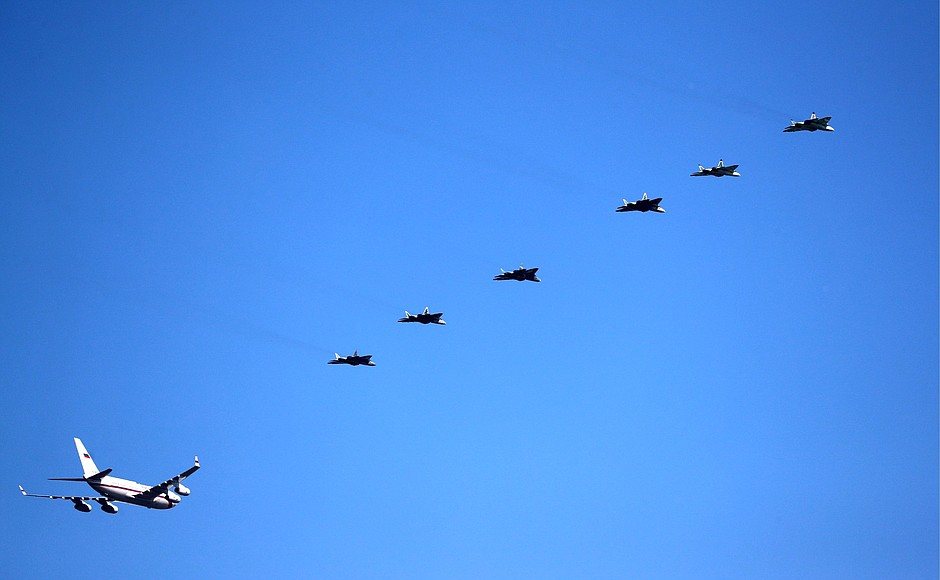
Six Sukhoi Su-57 (AFIC Felon) aircraft escort President of the Russian Federation Vladimir Putin's aircraft to the airport, during a visit to the Chkalov State Flight Test Centre, in a photo released 14 May 2019.

The 929th State Flight Test Center of the Ministry of Defense of the Russian Federation named after V.P. Chkalov (929 GLITs MO RF) is a Russian aviation research and testing military institution. This is the main military aviation test institution of the Aerospace Forces and the Armed Forces of Russia. Here military aviation equipment and aviation weapons are tested before entering service.

Its headquarters is at Akhtubinsk (air base), Akhtubinsk, Astrakhan Oblast, in the Southern Military District.

Most state flight tests are carried out in the GLITs and at its research centers, laboratories and test sites, including all flights for testing combat use and testing new weapons. Not a single type of aircraft, helicopter or model of aviation weapons enters service with the Russian Aerospace Forces, and in the past the Soviet Union, and other branches of the Armed Forces without passing tests at the GLITs. After 1991 and, with the expansion of the supply of Russian combat aircraft for export, the center tests new modifications of aircraft developed under contracts with foreign customers.

From 1920 to the present, more than 390 types of aircraft have been tested here, of which 280 types have been put into service. In 1996 three production Sukhoi Su-27Ms were delivered to the 929th State Flight Test Centre at Akhtubinsk to perform weapons trials.

In 1999 alone 191 test works was carried out at the GLITs. Research work at the GLITs is focused on methodological support for the assessment of advanced aircraft, the development of general technical requirements for the Air Force and the increase in the combat capabilities of production aircraft. The volume of R&D work in 1995 averaged 88 (of which 6 were flight, for comparison, in 1986 1320 R&D) plus up to 400 military scientific papers.

In May 2011 Sukhoi delivered the first Su-35S to Akhtubinsk to conduct state joint tests with the Defence Ministry to prepare for operational service.

In 2022 Google Earth imagery showed two Sukhoi S-70 Okhotnik-B at the test facility.

== Structure ==
The main base is in the City of Akhtubinsk; there are several testing centers in other parts of Russia. The training of military test pilots of the GLITs is carried out at the Air Force Test Pilot Training Center in Akhtubinsk.

=== Office of the Center and main divisions ===
Aircraft, their equipment and weapons, ground support and flight support facilities, as well as unmanned aircraft are undergoing state, control and special tests here. There are aerodrome, air ranges and a radio range, numerous specialized laboratories and stands, a complex of altitude-climatic and mechanical tests.

Here are also located:

- Branch of the Moscow Aviation Institute (MAI) "Rise"
- Aircraft Engine Testing Department (GLITs division).
- Air Force Test Pilot Training Center (established 1973) with three departments: aircraft, helicopter and navigation.

The track-measuring complex (TEC) is designed to use objects and battlefields combined into a single proving ground, which provide flight tests of aircraft equipment and weapons, conduct combat training of combat units of the Aerospace Forces and Russian Naval Aviation, as well as participate in other flight tests of weapons of the Armed Forces of the Russian Federation. The TEC includes systems for managing facilities, collecting and processing information, five Military training grounds, three test stations, and two commandant's offices. The largest aviation training ground in Russia is Groshevo (Vladimirovka), 22 km from Akhtubinsk; the rest are in Kazakhstan: Turgai, Sagyz, Suyunduk, Terekta and Atyrau, at a distance of 500–800 km from Akhtubinsk.

In 2008 the 929th Centre's subordinate organisations were listed as:

- 1338th Test Centre (испытательный центр) Chkalovsky Air Base - Il-22, Il-80, and Il-82
- High-altitude mountain Center for Air Materiel and Weapons Research - Nalchik Airport
- 368th Detached Composite Aviation Squadron
- 13th Aeronautic Test Facility - Volsk - air balloons
- 267th Center of Test Pilots Training - Akhtubinsk air base
