= Sukhoi Su-57 =

Russian stealth multirole fighter aircraft

Su-57
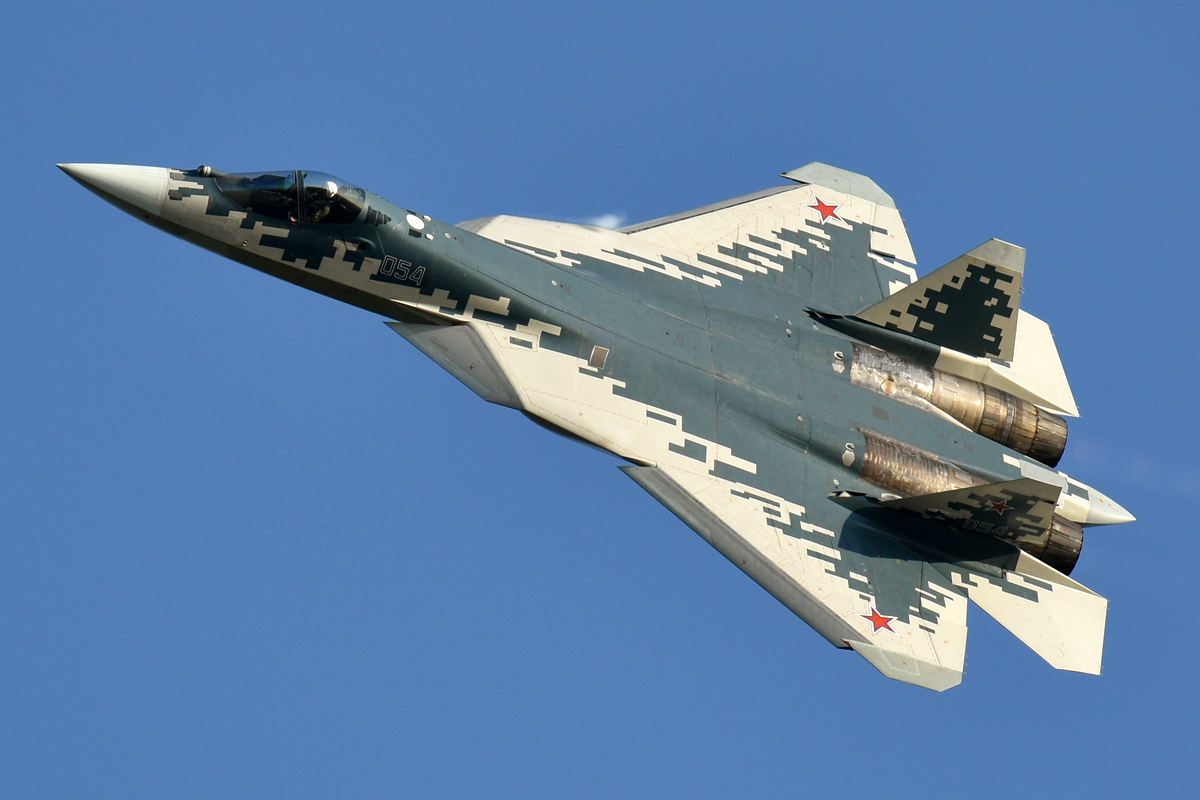
- 4th Su-57 prototype T-50-4

General information
- Type: Stealth multirole fighter
- National origin: Russia
- Manufacturer: United Aircraft Corporation
- Designer: Sukhoi
- Built by: Komsomolsk-on-Amur Aircraft Plant
- Status: In production
- Primary users: Russian Aerospace Forces Algerian Air Force
- Number built: 44+ as of 2026 (including 10 test aircraft)

History
- Manufactured: 2019–present
- Introduction date: 2020
- First flight: 29 January 2010; 16 years ago
- Variant: Sukhoi/HAL FGFA (cancelled)

The Sukhoi Su-57 (Russian: Сухой Су-57; NATO reporting name: Felon) is a twin-engine stealth multirole fighter aircraft developed by Sukhoi. It is the product of the PAK FA (Russian: ПАК ФА, prospective aeronautical complex of front-line aviation) programme, which was initiated in 1999 as a more modern and affordable alternative to the MFI (Mikoyan Project 1.44/1.42). Sukhoi's internal designation for the aircraft is T-50. The Su-57 is the first aircraft in Russian military service designed with stealth technology and is intended to be the basis for a family of stealth combat aircraft.

A multirole fighter capable of aerial combat as well as ground and maritime strike, the Su-57 incorporates stealth, supermaneuverability, supercruise, integrated avionics and large payload capacity. According to the US, it will be nuclear-capable via a forthcoming missile similar to the Kinzhal. The aircraft is expected to succeed the MiG-29 and Su-27 in the Russian military service and has also been marketed for export. The first prototype aircraft flew in 2010, but the program experienced a protracted development due to various structural and technical issues that emerged during trials, including the destruction of the first production aircraft in a crash before its delivery.

In 2018, during the Russian intervention in the Syrian civil war, at least two Su-57 prototypes were first deployed and used in combat. After repeated delays, the first Su-57 entered service with the Russian Aerospace Forces (VKS) (Note: Russia established the Russian Aerospace Forces (VKS) as a new branch of its military on 1 August 2015 with the merging of the Russian Air Force (VVS) and the Russian Aerospace Defence Forces (VVKO).) in December 2020. It has reportedly been sporadically used in Ukraine since the 2022 Russian invasion of Ukraine.

== Development ==
=== Origins ===
In 1979, the Soviet Union outlined a need for next-generation fighter aircraft intended to enter service in the 1990s. The programme became the I-90 (Russian: И-90, short for: Истребитель 1990–х годов, lit. 'Fighter of the 1990s') and required the fighter to be "multifunctional" (i.e. multirole) by having substantial ground attack capabilities, and would eventually replace the MiG-29 and Su-27 in frontline tactical aviation service. Two subsequent projects were designed to meet these requirements: the MFI (Russian: МФИ, short for: Многофункциональный фронтовой истребитель, lit. 'Multifunctional Frontline Fighter') and smaller LFI (Russian: ЛФИ, Russian: Л short for: Лёгкий, lit. 'Light'), with conceptual work beginning in 1983. (Note: At the time, there was a planned fleet of one-third MFI and two-thirds LFI.) Mikoyan was selected for the MFI and began developing its MiG 1.44/1.42. Though not a participant in the MFI, Sukhoi started its own programme in 1983 to develop technologies for a next-generation fighter, eventually resulting in the forward-swept wing S-32 experimental aircraft, later redesignated S-37 and then Su-47.

Due to a lack of funds after the dissolution of the Soviet Union, the MFI was repeatedly delayed and the first flight of the MiG 1.44/1.42 prototype did not occur until 2000, nine years behind schedule. Owing to the high costs, the MFI and LFI were eventually cancelled while the Russian Ministry of Defence began work on a new next-generation fighter programme; in 1999, the ministry initiated the PAK FA or I-21 programme, with the competition announced in April 2001. (Note: In the late 1990s, as the status of MFI declined, conceptual work for a next generation fighter was conducted under the LFS (Russian: ЛФС, short for: Лёгкий фронтовой самолёт, romanized: Lyogkiy Frontovoy Samolyot, lit. 'Light Frontline Aircraft') until efforts shifted to the PAK FA.) Because of Russia's financial difficulties, the programme aimed to rein in costs by producing a single multirole fifth-generation fighter that would replace both the Su-27 and the MiG-29. Further cost-saving measures include an intended size in between that of the Su-27 and the MiG-29 and normal takeoff weight considerably smaller than the MiG MFI's 28.6 tonnes (63,000 lb) and the Su-47's 26.8 tonnes (59,000 lb).

Sukhoi's approach to the PAK FA competition differed fundamentally from Mikoyan's; whereas Mikoyan proposed for the three design bureaus (Mikoyan, Sukhoi, and Yakovlev) to cooperate as a consortium with the winning team leading the design effort, Sukhoi's proposal had itself as the lead designer from the beginning and included a joint work agreement that covered the entire development and production cycle, from propulsion and avionics suppliers to research facilities. Additionally, the two companies had differing design philosophies for the aircraft. Mikoyan's E-721 was smaller and more affordable, with normal takeoff weight of 16–17 tonnes (35,000–37,000 lb) and powered by a pair of Klimov VK-10M engines with 10–11 tonnes (98.1–108 kN, 22,000–24,300 lbf) of thrust each. In contrast, Sukhoi's T-50 would be comparatively larger and more capable, with normal takeoff weight goal of 22–23 tonnes (49,000–51,000 lb) and powered by a pair of Lyulka-Saturn AL-41F-1 engines each with maximum thrust in the 14.5-tonne (142 kN, 32,000 lbf) class. (Note: While Sukhoi tested forward-swept wings with the Su-47, Soviet and Russian research indicated that such configuration was mainly beneficial at transonic speeds and loses out to conventionally swept wings at supersonic speeds. The forward-swept wing was not chosen for the T-50.)

In April 2002, the Ministry of Defence selected Sukhoi over Mikoyan as the winner of the PAK FA competition and the lead design bureau of the new aircraft. (Note: Yakovlev would only participate as a subcontractor for the potential short takeoff and vertical landing (STOVL) module in the future.) In addition to the merits of the proposal, Sukhoi's experience in the 1990s was taken into account, with the successful development of various Su-27 derivatives and numerous exports ensuring its financial stability. According to the Russian Air Force Commander-in-Chief Vladimir Mikhaylov, flight tests were projected to begin in 2007. Mikoyan continued to develop its E-721 as the LMFS (Russian: ЛМФС, short for: Лёгкий многофункциональный фронтовой самолёт, lit. 'Light Multifunctional Frontline Aircraft') at its own expense.

=== Research and development ===
The research and development programme of the PAK FA was called Stolitsa (Russian: Столица, lit. 'Capital city'). In 2002, Alexander Davidenko selected as the T-50's chief designer at Sukhoi. The Novosibirsk Aircraft Production Association (NAPO) and Komsomolsk-on-Amur Aircraft Production Association (KnAAZ) would manufacture the new multi-role fighter, with KnAAZ performing final assembly at Komsomol'sk-on-Amur. Following a competition held in 2003, the Tekhnokompleks Scientific and Production Center, Ramenskoye Instrument Building Design Bureau, the Tikhomirov Scientific Research Institute of Instrument Design (NIIP), the Ural Optical and Mechanical Plant (UOMZ) in Yekaterinburg, the Polet firm in Nizhny Novgorod and the Central Scientific Research Radio Engineering Institute in Moscow were selected for the development of the PAK FA's avionics suite. In April 2004, NPO Lyulka-Saturn (now NPO Saturn) was signed as the contractor for the AL-41F-1 engines with the development designation izdeliye 117. (Note: The Russian term изделие, translit. izdeliye literally means "manufactured article" or "product".)

Sukhoi used existing airframes as testbeds for various subsystems and concepts; the Su-47 tested internal weapon bays, and Su-27M prototypes served as testbeds for the flight control system and engines. To reduce developmental risk and spread out associated costs, as well as to bridge the gap with extant fourth generation fighters, Sukhoi implemented some of the T-50's technology and features, such as propulsion and certain avionics, in an advanced derivative of the Su-27 called the T-10BM (Russian: БМ, short for: большая модернизация, lit. 'Major Modernization'), which was eventually procured by the Russian Ministry of Defence in 2009 and entered service as the Su-35S in 2014.

In December 2004, the T-50's conceptual design and shape was complete and approved by the Ministry of Defence; government funding of the programme began in 2005 and drastically increased in 2006 when detailed design was underway. On 8 August 2007, Russian Air Force Commander-in-Chief Alexander Zelin was quoted by Russian news agencies that the programme's development stage was complete and construction of the first aircraft for flight testing would begin, with three flyable T-50 prototypes planned to be built by 2009. In 2009, the aircraft's design was officially approved. The T-50 was named Su-57 in July 2017.

Since the early stages of the PAK FA programme, Russia sought after foreign partnerships on the project to increase funding for its development and also secure large export orders. On 18 October 2007, Russia and India signed a contract for Sukhoi and Hindustan Aeronautics Limited (HAL) to jointly develop a derivative of the PAK FA called the Fifth Generation Fighter Aircraft (FGFA). In September 2010, India and Russia agreed on a preliminary design contract where each country was to invest $6 billion; a memorandum of understanding for the preliminary design was signed in December 2010, and the development of the FGFA was expected to take 8–10 years. By 2014, however, the Indian Air Force began voicing concerns over performance, cost, and workshare. India found that the aircraft does not meet its requirements and eventually left the partnership in 2018. The concerns over the aircraft included the limited stealth characteristics up to the frontal 60° arc, limiting its advantage over fourth-generation fighters, and the lack of supercruise ability – a distinction of other fifth-generation fighters. Nevertheless, Sukhoi continued to develop and promote the Su-57 for prospective export customers and marketed the aircraft during the 2019 Langkawi International Maritime and Aerospace Exhibition. The export variant, designated Su-57E, was officially unveiled at the MAKS-2019 air show on 28 August 2019.

=== Prototyping ===
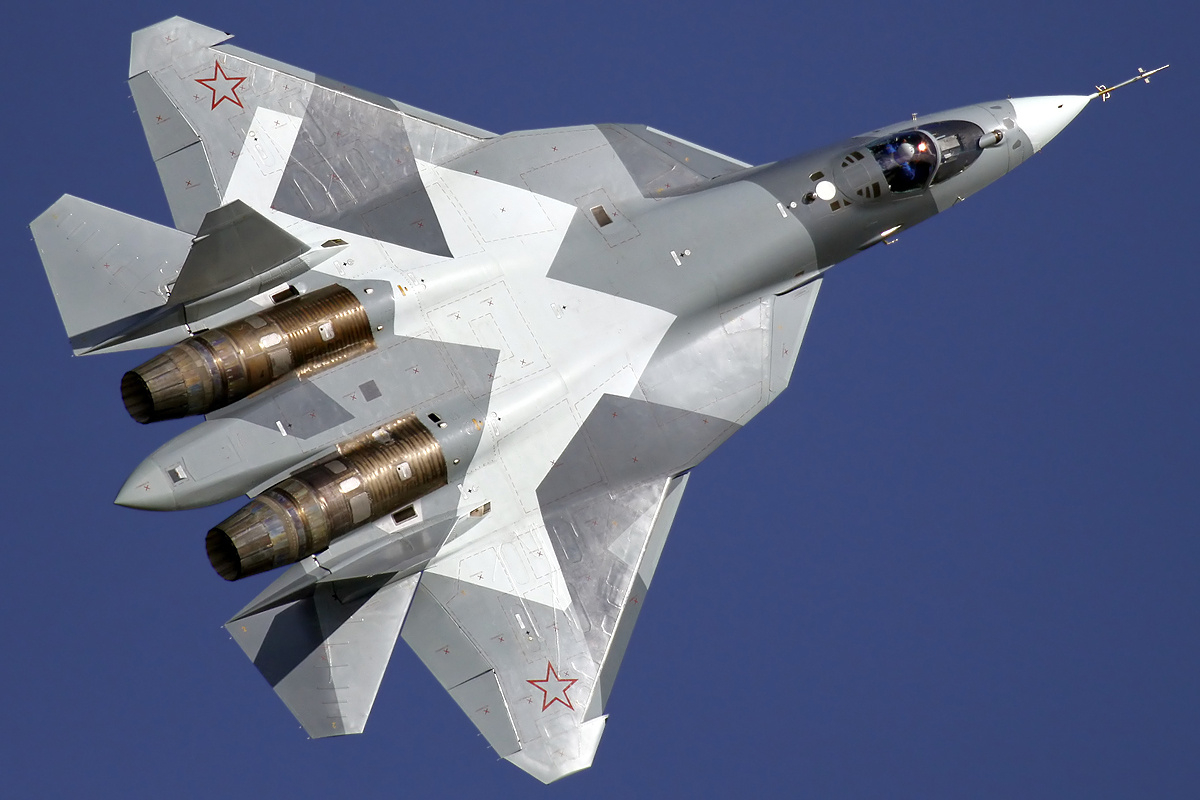
Su-57 prototype at the MAKS-2011 Air Show

The T-50's maiden flight was repeatedly postponed from early 2007 after encountering unspecified technical problems. In August 2009, Alexander Zelin acknowledged that problems with the engine and in technical research remained unsolved. On 28 February 2009, Sukhoi general director Mikhail Pogosyan announced that the airframe was almost finished and that the first prototype should be ready by August 2009. On 20 August 2009, Pogosyan said that the first flight would be by year's end. Konstantin Makiyenko, deputy head of the Moscow-based Centre for Analysis of Strategies and Technologies said that "even with delays", the aircraft would likely make its first flight by January or February, adding that it would take five to ten years for commercial production.

Flight testing was further delayed when Deputy Prime Minister Sergei Ivanov announced in December 2009 that the first trials would begin in 2010. The first taxi test was successfully completed on 24 December 2009, and the maiden flight of the first prototype aircraft, T-50-1, occurred on 29 January 2010. Piloted by Sukhoi test pilot Sergei Bogdan, the aircraft's 47-minute maiden flight took place at KnAAPO's Dzemgi Airport in the Russian Far East. Construction of the prototypes would progress slower than initially planned; by the end of October 2013, the test programme had amassed more than 450 flights across five aircraft.

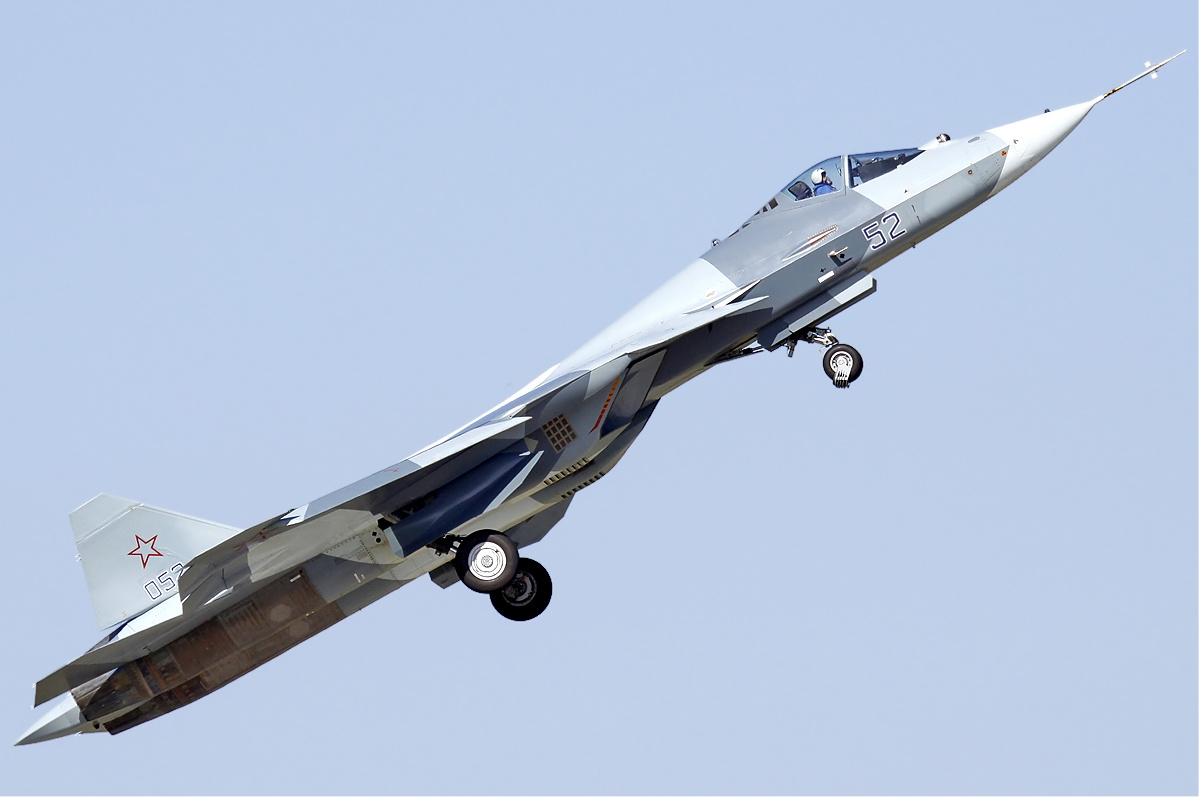
Su-57 prototype climbing after takeoff, 2011

A total of ten flying and three non-flying T-50 prototypes would be built for preliminary flight tests and state trials. Initially, the program was planned to have up to six prototypes before the start of serial production; however testing would reveal that the initial prototypes did not have adequate fatigue life, with early structural cracks forming in the airframe.

The aircraft subsequently underwent a structural redesign, with changes including increased composite material usage, reinforced airframe to meet full life cycle requirements, elongated tail "sting", and slightly greater wingspan; the sixth flyable prototype was the first of the redesigned "second stage" aircraft, with the five initial prototypes consequently considered "first stage" vehicles and requiring additional structural reinforcements in order to continue flight tests. (Note: The originally planned sixth flying prototype, T-50-6-1, was to be the last "first stage" airframe. After the fifth prototype, T-50-5, was involved in a fire accident, T-50-6-1 was completed using parts salvaged from the written-off T-50-5 and was renamed T-50-5R, carrying the same "055" bort number. While it is essentially a new and distinct airframe, official accounting still considers the two airframes to be the "same", with the R (Russian: Р) short for: ремонтый, lit. 'repair'. The sixth flying prototype T-50-6-2, the first "second stage" aircraft, was given the "056" bort number.) The last two flying prototypes were test articles of production Su-57 aircraft with full mission systems on board. While the "second stage" structural redesign reduced the weight growth from the required strengthening of the "first stage" design, the normal takeoff weight still increased to approximately 26.7 tonnes (59,000 lb). Issues and accidents during the testing resulted in repeated delays to the programme, with the delivery of the first production aircraft pushed back from 2015 to 2020.

=== Procurement ===
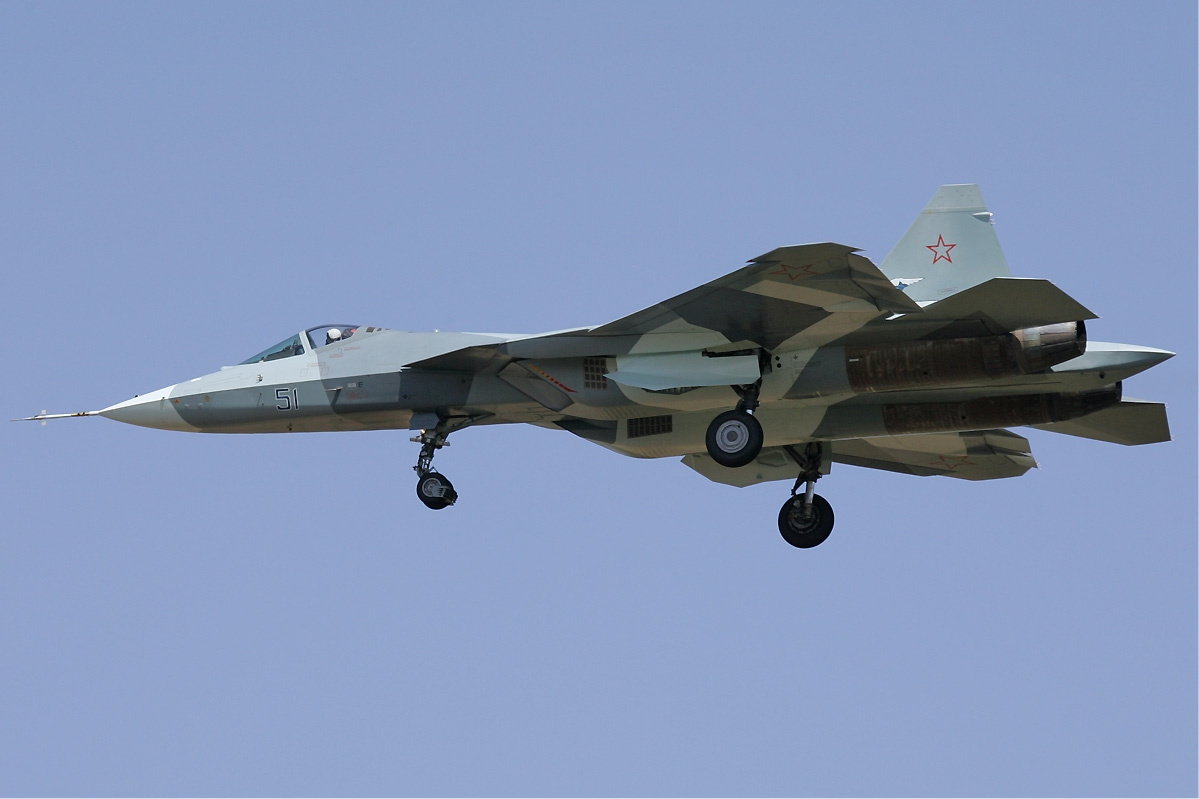
Sukhoi Su-57 in flight with landing gear deployed, 2010

The procurement plans for the PAK FA have been considerably scaled back and delayed from original plans. In 2011, the Ministry of Defence had planned on buying the first 10 aircraft for evaluation after 2012 and 60 production standard aircraft after 2015. These plans were refined under the State Armament Programme from 2011 to 2020 (GPV-2020), with serial production hoped to begin in 2016; the Ministry of Defence was planning to acquire 52 aircraft by 2020, and another 150–160 by 2025. Additionally, export orders for 250–300 FGFA were expected to begin in 2017.

Plans were greatly cut down in 2015 as a result of technical obstacles encountered during testing, India's unclear commitment to the partnership, and Russia's economic downturn due to international sanctions after its annexation of Crimea and the drop in oil prices. Russian Deputy Minister of Defence Yury Borisov stated in 2015 that the Russian Air Force would slow production, reduce its initial order to 12 fighters, and operate large fleets of upgraded fourth-generation fighters such as the Su-35S and the Su-30SM. In 2017, Borisov stated that the PAK FA would most likely enter service in 2018 and be part of the new State Armament Programme from 2018 to 2027 (GPV-2027). On 30 June 2018, an order for 12 aircraft was agreed, while deliveries to the Russian Armed Forces was pushed back again to 2019 with the first aircraft planned to join fighter regiments at the Lipetsk Air Center. At the same time, Borisov praised the Su-35S, stating that it was comparable to the Su-57 except for the stealth features while being more affordable.

Due to the substantially higher cost of the Su-57 compared to the Su-35S and Su-30SM, the design was placed on hold for mass production until the need arises. On 22 August 2018, during the International Military-Technical Forum «ARMY-2018», the Defence Ministry and Sukhoi signed the first contract for delivery of two serial Su-57 fighters scheduled for 2019 and 2020 respectively. In January 2019, the Ministry of Defence announced they hoped to conclude a second contract for 13 more aircraft in 2020.

However, on 15 May 2019, the acquisition plan drastically changed when Russian president Vladimir Putin announced that 76 aircraft would be purchased and delivered to the Aerospace Forces by 2028. This came after the negotiations were able to lower the price of the Su-57 and equipment by 20%. The contract for the 76 aircraft was formally signed on 27 June 2019 at the International Military-Technical Forum «ARMY-2019». The same month, General Director of Tactical Missiles Corporation (KRTV) Boris Obnosov reported, a contract for serial production of ammunition for Su-57 fighters was signed, and is being inducted.

Serial production of the aircraft began in July 2019, with the first production aircraft scheduled to be delivered by the end of the year; following the crash of the first production aircraft, the Russian Aerospace Forces took delivery of the second Su-57 as its first aircraft in December 2020. By May 2022, four more aircraft were delivered, and production has progressed slower than planned with total of six aircraft delivered by end of the year.

=== Further developments ===
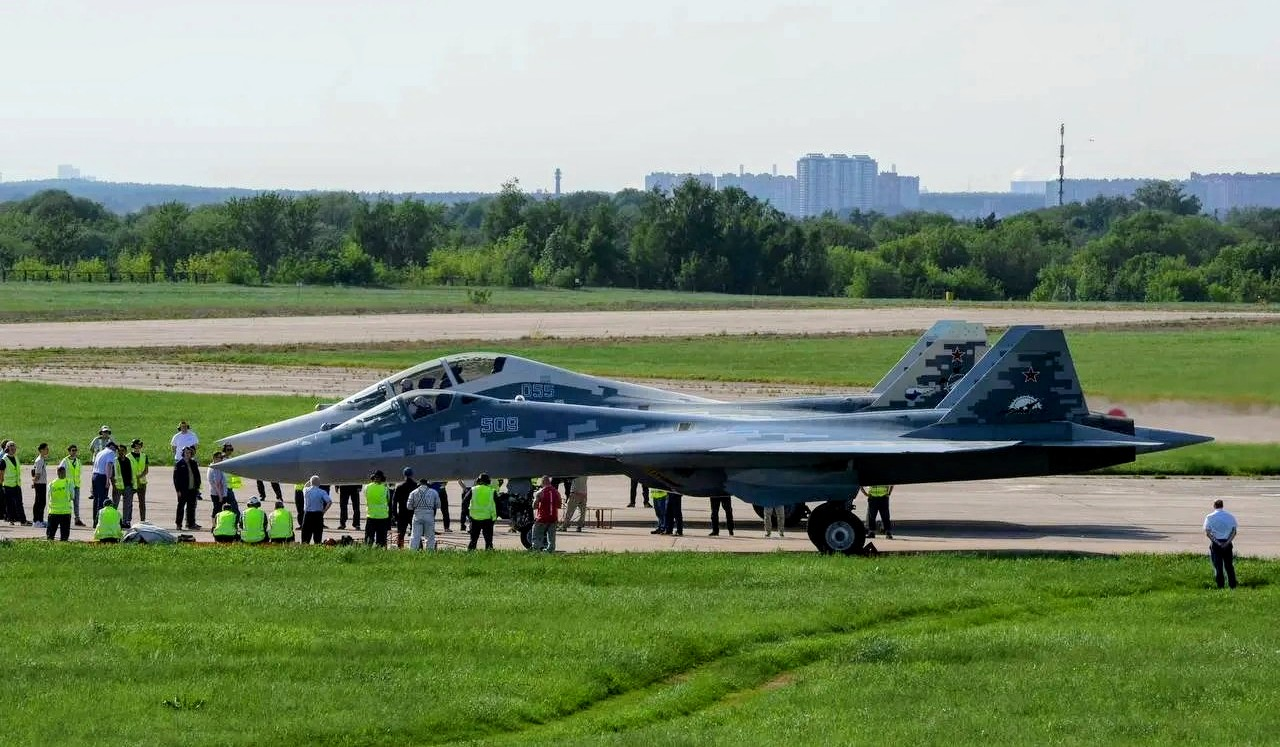
Su-57D and Su-57 prototypes (both T-50)

In 2004, Sukhoi anticipated that the Su-57 could become the basis for a family of combat aircraft for the Russian Aerospace Forces, similar to the Su-27 family. Under the program name Megapolis (Russian: Мегаполис, lit. 'Megalopolis'), the company is developing a new variant, designated Su-57M, that augments the base Su-57 design with improved mission systems, reliability and maintenance enhancements, incorporation of electromechanical drives, and the new NPO Saturn izdeliye 30, or AL-51F-1 engines. As a backup, Saturn also has a program called Udlinitel (Russian: Удлинитель, lit. 'Extension') to further improve the AL-41F-1.

The formal contract was signed in 2018, although preliminary work had begun earlier. In 2020, flight test of the improved variant was planned to begin in 2022, with serial production in the mid-2020s. The second flying T-50 prototype was used to test the new izdeliye 30 engine starting in 2017; the third prototype was configured for teaming tests with the Okhotnik UCAV in 2018. Additionally, work is underway to make a variant of the aircraft that can operate on aircraft carriers. In July 2021, Russian state media announced that a two-seater variant of the Su-57 was under development, to be used for training pilots and for ensuring the control of the Sukhoi S-70 Okhotnik UCAV. Designated Su-57D, this variant can also carry a weapon systems officer (WSO) that can perform additional tasks for more complex missions and potentially perform command-and-control functions. It first flew on 19 May 2026.

Sukhoi has also used technology from the Su-57 to produce a mockup of a more affordable lightweight single-engine aircraft, designated as the LTS (Russian: ЛТС, short for: Лёгкий тактический самолёт, lit. 'Light Tactical Aircraft'). At the 2021 Moscow Air Show (MAKS-2021), Sukhoi revealed its LTS mockup, named Checkmate, which shares many systems with the Su-57, including radar, main weapons bay, vertical stabilizers, and wings.

As of 2024, international sanctions on Russia's defence industries has made it far more difficult for Russia to source the Western avionics and micro-electronics that have been essential components of its advanced fighter and attack aircraft cockpits.

The United Aircraft Corporation (UAC) reported that an upgraded Su-57 aircraft made its first flight on 21 October 2022. It is yet unclear whether this airframe represents a Su-57M, as the "second-stage engine" (alluding to the AL-51F-1) was reportedly not mounted. The AL-51F-1 has had a sluggish testing pace and developmental difficulties. In 2025 at the Dubai Air Show, Rostec unveiled the izdeliye 177 engine, which combines components and technology from both the AL-41F-1 and AL-51F-1 and proposed as a potential alternative for the latter. This engine, likely the result of the Udlinitel project, first flew in December 2025.

== Design ==
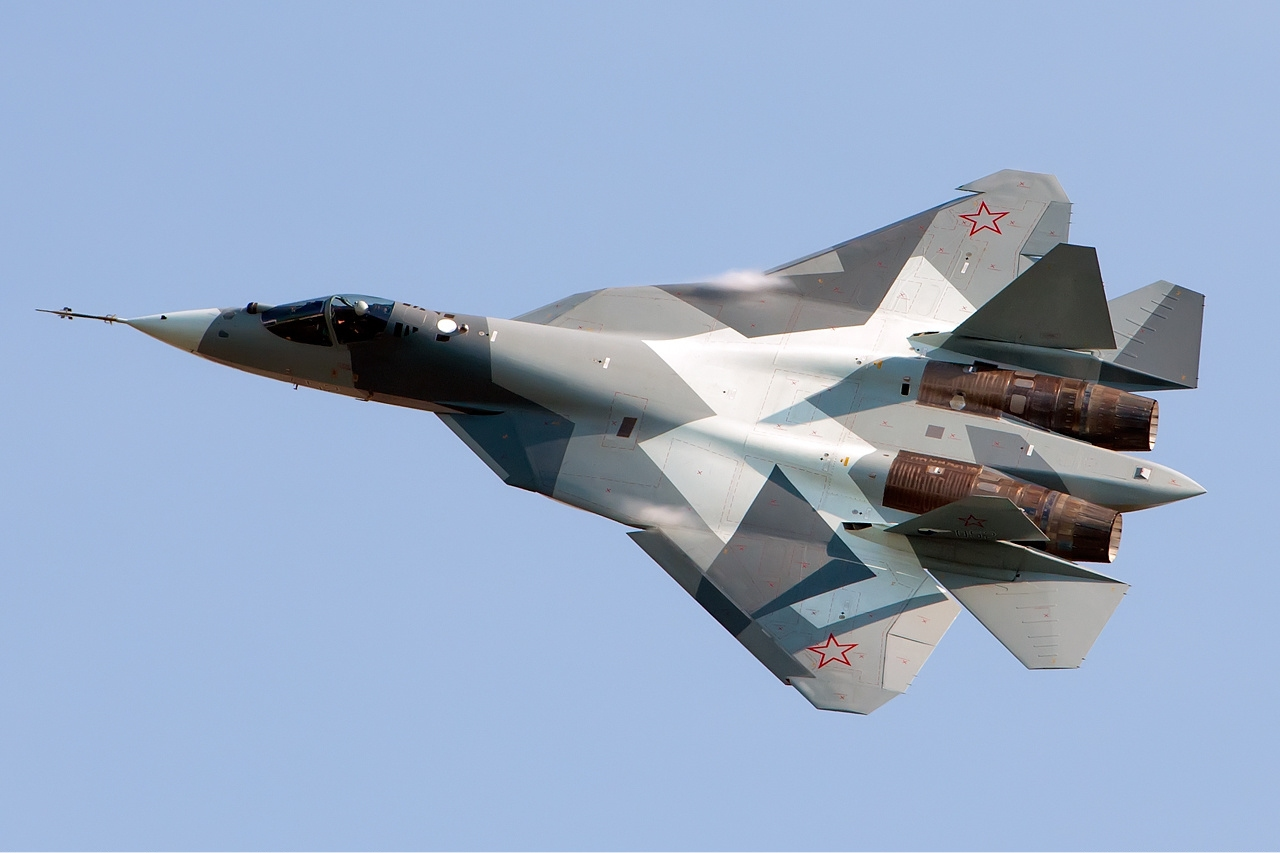
Su-57 view from above, showing an early pre-production camouflage similar to the Su-35

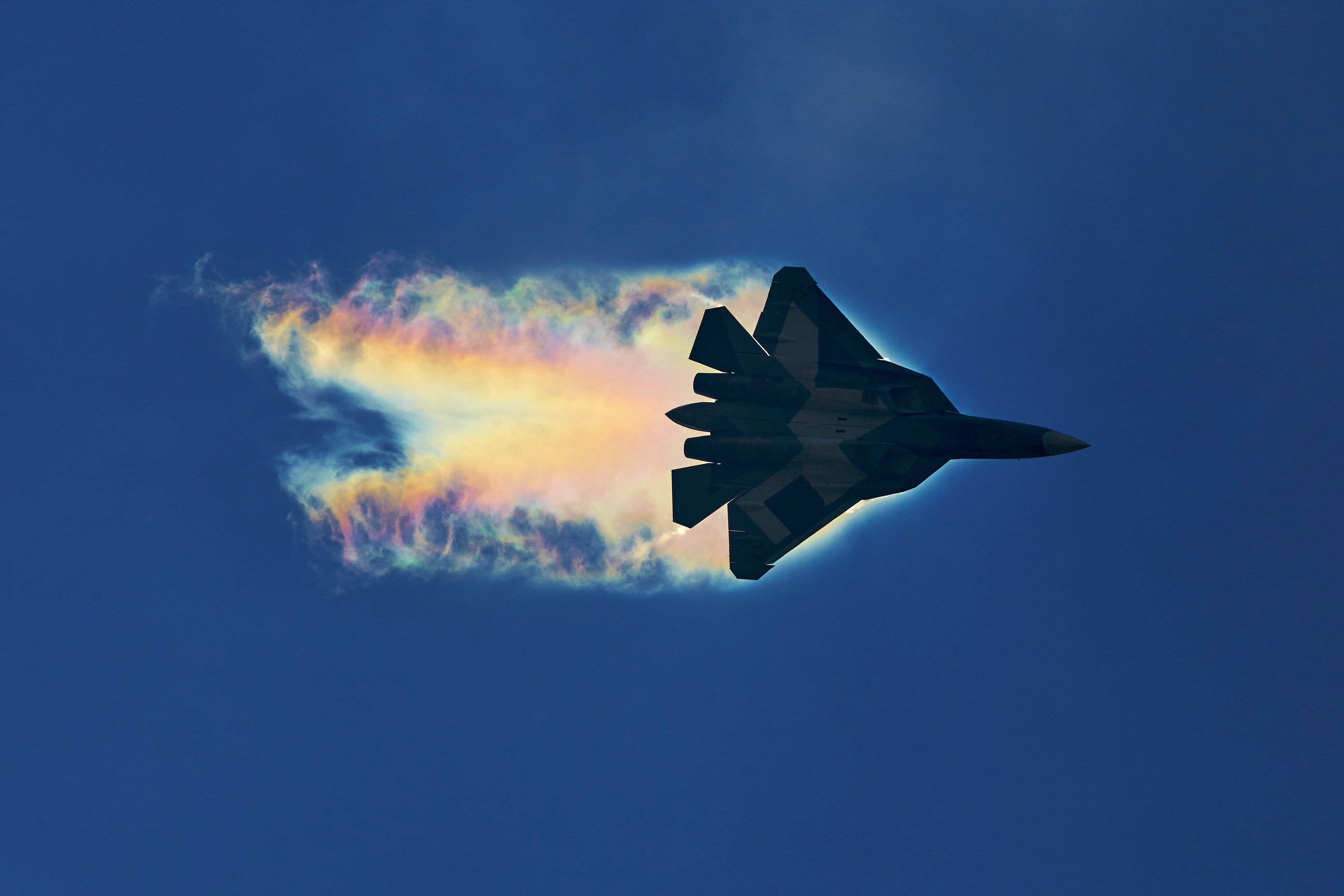
Pre-production Su-57 aerodynamic condensation at the MAKS-2015 Air Show

The Su-57 is a fifth-generation multirole fighter aircraft and the first operational stealth aircraft for the Russian armed forces. In addition to stealth, the fighter emphasizes supermaneuverability in all aircraft axes, capacious internal payload bays for multirole versatility, and advanced sensor systems such as active phased-array radar as well as the integration of these systems to achieve high levels of automation.

In the Su-57's design, Sukhoi cited the Lockheed Martin F-22 as the baseline for a supermaneuverable stealth fighter, but addressed what the bureau considered to be the limitations, such as the inability to use thrust vectoring to induce roll and yaw moments, a lack of space for weapons bays between the engines resulting in insufficient payload, and complications for post-stall recovery if thrust vectoring fails. In particular, Sukhoi considered the F-22 design unsuitable as a multirole fighter required for PAK FA due to the limited payload that was too focused on air-to-air missiles.

The aircraft has a wide blended wing body fuselage with two widely spaced engines and has all-moving horizontal and vertical stabilisers, with the vertical stabilisers canted for stealth; the trapezoid wings have leading edge flaps, ailerons, and flaperons. The aircraft incorporates thrust vectoring and large leading edge root extensions that shift the aerodynamic center forward, increasing static instability and maneuverability. These extensions have adjustable leading–edge vortex controllers (LEVCONs) designed to control the generated vortices and can provide trim and improve high angle of attack behaviour, including a quick stall recovery if the thrust vectoring system fails. To air-brake, the ailerons deflect up while the flaperons deflect down and the vertical stabilisers toe inward to increase drag. Although the majority of the structural materials are alloys with 40.5–44.5% aluminum alloys and 18.6% titanium alloys, the aircraft makes extensive use of composites, with the material comprising 22–26% of the structural weight and approximately 70% of the outer surface.

Designed from the outset as a multirole aircraft, the Su-57 has substantial internal payload capacity that allows the carriage of multiple large air-to-surface ordnance. Weapons are housed in two tandem main weapons bays in the large ventral volume between the widely spaced engine nacelles and smaller side bays with bulged triangular-section fairings near the wing root. Internal weapons carriage eliminates drag from external stores and enables higher performance compared to external carriage, as well as preserving the stealth shaping.

The high degree of static instability (or relaxed stability) in both pitch and yaw, advanced KSU-50 flight control system, and canted thrust vectoring nozzles make the Su-57 departure-resistant and highly maneuverable in all axes and enables the aircraft to perform very high angles of attack maneuvers such as the Pugachev's Cobra and the bell maneuver, along with doing flat rotations with little altitude loss. The aerodynamics and engines enable it to achieve speeds of Mach 2 and fly supersonic without afterburners, or supercruise, at Mach 1.3, giving a significant kinematic advantage and extends the effective range of missiles and bombs over previous generations of aircraft. (Note: The initial maximum speed requirement was Mach 2.35 at high altitude, but this was reduced to Mach 2.15 and then to Mach 2.0 in 2006 order to increase the amount of composites used in the airframe.) Combined with a high fuel load, the fighter has a supersonic range of over 1,500 km (930 mi), more than twice that of the Su-27. An extendable refueling probe is available to further increase its range.

=== Stealth ===
The first aircraft in Russian military service to emphasize stealth, the Su-57 employs a variety of methods to reduce its radar signature. Similar to other stealth fighters such as the F-22, the aircraft aligns the planform edges to reduce its radar cross-section (RCS); the leading and trailing edges of the wings and control surfaces and the serrated edges of skin panels are carefully angled to reduce the number of directions the radar waves can be reflected. Weapons are carried internally in weapons bays within the airframe and antennas are recessed from the surface of the skin to preserve the aircraft's stealthy shape, while radar absorbent material (RAM) coatings absorb radar emissions and reduce the reflection back to the source.

The infrared search-and-track sensor housing is turned backwards when not in use and its rear is also treated with RAM. To mask the significant RCS contribution of the engine face, the walls of the inlet ducts are coated with RAM and the partial serpentine ducts obscure most of the engines' compressor face and inlet guide-vanes (IGV); the remaining exposed engine face is masked by a slanted blocker grid placed in front of the IGV at a distance of 0.7–1.2 times the diameter of the duct, similar in principle to the method on the Boeing F/A-18E/F.

The aircraft canopy is coated with 70–90 nm thick metal oxide layers with enhanced radar wave absorbing to reduce the radar return of the cockpit by 30% and protect the pilot from the impact of ultraviolet and thermal radiation. The production tolerances are significantly tighter than previous Russian fighters in order to improve stealth characteristics.

The combined effect of airframe shape and RAM of the production aircraft is estimated to have reduced the aircraft's RCS to a value thirty times smaller than that of the Su-27 Sukhoi's patent for the T-50 stealth features cites an intention to reduce average RCS to approximately 0.1 to 1 m^{2}, compared to the Su-27's RCS of approximately 10 to 15 m^{2}. The Su-57's design emphasizes frontal stealth, with RCS-reducing features most apparent in the forward hemisphere; the shaping of the aft fuselage is less optimized for radar stealth compared to American stealth designs such as the F-22 and F-35, likely as a result of cost reduction as well as the Russian doctrine of operating the aircraft within the umbrella of friendly integrated air defense systems.

As with other stealth fighters, the Su-57's low observability measures are chiefly effective against super-high-frequency (between 3 and 30 GHz) radars, usually found on other aircraft. The effects of Rayleigh scattering and resonance mean that low-frequency radars, employed by weather radars and early-warning radars are more likely to detect the Su-57 due to its size. Such radars are also large, susceptible to clutter and are less precise. The aircraft has been scrutinized for the rough production quality, particularly on test aircraft often used for flight and static displays; production aircraft generally have better quality.

On 4 November 2024, the fourth Su-57 prototype, T-50-4, was to be put on static display at China's Zhuhai Airshow. The prototype had a fuel stop at Taiyuan city, which allowed a member of the public to view the prototype up close to take pictures and video. Video taken of the aircraft, and uploaded to social media, highlighted a number of issues, including numerous screws and rivets that were "clearly visible" and not "flush" with the panels. Sections were described as "poorly aligned" with visible gaps between parts of the fuselage. The airframe wasn't designed for low observability and showed signs of "poor workmanship". The tail had different types of bolts used. Bolts with "single-slotted, Phillips, and with a hexagonal hex head". Rivets were used instead of bolts to reduce radar cross section (RCS) compared to screws. By comparison, the F-35 has a RCS of "around 0.005 square meters", the F-22 has a RCS of "0.0005 square meters", and the Su-57 has a RCS of "0.1 to 0.5 square meters". The weapons bay door couldn't be fully closed.

=== Engines ===
The Su-57 is powered by a pair of NPO Lyulka-Saturn izdeliye 117, or AL-41F-1, augmented turbofans. The engine is a highly improved and uprated variant of the AL-31 and produces 9 tonnes (88.3 kN, 19,840 lbf) of dry thrust, 14.5 tonnes (142.2 kN, 31,970 lbf) of thrust in afterburner, and 15 tonnes (147.1 kN, 33,070 lbf) of thrust in "special" emergency power. The engines have full authority digital engine control (FADEC) and are integrated into the flight control system to facilitate maneuverability and handling. The AL-41F-1 is closely related to the Lyulka-Saturn izdeliye 117S engine, or AL-41F-1S, used by the Su-35S, with the latter's separate engine control system being the key difference.

The aircraft employs thrust vector control (TVC) where the vectoring nozzles' rotational axes are each canted at an angle, similar to the nozzle arrangement first employed on the Su-30MKI and also used on Su-35S. The nozzles themselves vector in only one plane; the canting allows roll and yaw moments by vectoring each nozzle differentially, thus enabling the aircraft to produce thrust vectoring moments about all three aircraft axes, pitch, yaw and roll. The engine inlet incorporates variable intake ramps for supersonic efficiency and retractable mesh screens to prevent engine damage from foreign object debris ingestion especially when operating in short, austere runways. In 2014, the Indian Air Force openly expressed concerns over the reliability and performance of the AL-41F-1, especially due to the lack of supercruise ability – a distinction of other fifth-generation fighters; during the 2011 Moscow Air Show (MAKS-2011), a Su-57 suffered a compressor stall that forced the aircraft to abort takeoff.

The planned Su-57M will be equipped with a new engine from NPO Saturn in the mid-2020s under the development designation izdeliye 30 and eventually designated AL-51F-1. The powerplant is designed with an estimated thrust of 11 tonnes (107.9 kN, 24,250 lbf) dry and 16.5 tonnes (162 kN, 36,380 lbf) in afterburner. In addition to improved performance, reliability, and costs compared to the AL-41F-1, the AL-51F-1 will also reduce the aircraft's radar and infrared signature with glass-fibre plastic IGVs and a new nozzle with serrated flaps. The engine has experienced developmental difficulties and a sluggish test pace, and further evolutions of the AL-41F-1 under the Udlinitel project have been developed as a fallback. In 2025, Rostec unveiled the izdeliye 177 engine, which combines the technologies of both the AL-41F-1 and AL-51F-1; this engine produces 11 tonnes (107.9 kN, 24,250 lbf) dry and 16 tonnes (157 kN, 35,270 lbf) in afterburner. It first flew in December 2025.

In 2023, it was reported that UEC Saturn is developing an alternative non-axisymmetric "flat" nozzle for the Su-57; flight testing began in late 2024. Because the flat nozzle was requested well after Sukhoi had finalized the Su-57 design, Saturn designed the nozzle to fit with minimal changes to the airframe. This nozzle is an option for the AL-51F-1 as well as the izdeliye 177.

=== Armament ===
The Su-57 has two tandem main internal weapon bays each approximately 4.4 m (14.4 ft) long and 0.9 m (3.0 ft) wide and two side weapon bays with triangular section fairings under the fuselage near the wing root. The main bays have two types of ejection launchers made by Vympel, the UVKU-50L for missiles weighing up to 300 kg (660 lb), and the UVKU-50U for ordnance weighing up to 700 kg (1,500 lb); the side bays use the VPU-50 launch rails.

For air-to-air combat, the Su-57 carries four beyond-visual-range missiles in its two main weapons bays and two short-range missiles in the side bays. The primary medium-range missile is the active radar-homing K/R-77M (izdeliye 180), (Note: Soviet and Russian missile under development are given the K prefix, which becomes the R prefix when the weapon becomes operational.) an upgraded R-77 variant with AESA seeker, dual-pulse motor, and conventional rear fins. The short-range missile is the infrared-homing ("heat seeking") R-74M2 (izdeliye 760), an upgraded R-74 variant with reduced cross-section for internal carriage. A clean-sheet design short-range missile designated K-MD (izdeliye 300) is being developed to eventually replace the R-74M2. For longer ranged applications, the Su-57 can carry the izdeliye 810 missile, a further development of the R-37M with shorter control surfaces and updated motor and seeker, with two in each main weapons bay; the R-37M could be carried externally.

For striking surface targets, the aircraft can carry the 250 kg (550 lb) KAB-250 or 500 kg (1,100 lb) KAB-500 precision guided bombs in its main bays. Internal weapons also include the Kh-38M air-to-ground missile, Kh-35U (AS-20 "Kayak") anti-ship missile, Kh-58UShK (AS-11 "Kilter") anti-radiation missile, and Kh-69 (originally designated Kh-59MK2) cruise missile. For missions that do not require stealth, the Su-57 can carry stores on its six external hardpoints which can use most Russian tactical fighter weapons. One of the new standoff cruise missiles designed for external carriage is the S-71K. According to the US, it is expected to be nuclear-capable with a missile similar to the Kh-47M2 Kinzhal. The missile is to have intra-body accommodation and smaller dimensions to allow it to be carried inside the Su-57's main bays.

The aircraft has a 9A1-4071K (GSh-30-1) 30 mm autocannon with 150 cartridges mounted internally near the right LEVCON root. The weapon has an effective range of 800 m (870 yd) against aerial targets and 1,800 m (2,000 yd) against surface targets.

=== Cockpit ===
The Su-57 has a glass cockpit with no analogue gauges; information is displayed on two 38 cm (15 in) main multi-functional LCD displays similar to the arrangement of the Su-35S. Supplementing the primary display is a smaller multi-functional display and digital control panel. The cockpit has a wide-angle (30° by 22°) head-up display (HUD). Primary controls are the joystick and a pair of throttles, with all major functions controlled with hands on throttle and stick (HOTAS). The aircraft uses a two-piece canopy, with the aft section sliding forward and locking into place. The canopy is treated with metallized coatings to reduce the aircraft's radar signature. The Su-57 integrated computer system at Chip "1890VM8Ya" – FGU FSC NIISI (in Russian).

The aircraft uses the NPP Zvezda K-36D-5 ejection seat and the SOZhE-50 life support system, which comprises the anti-g and oxygen generating system. The pilot is equipped with a ZSh-10B helmet which mounts the NSTsI-50 digital display system, which enhances pilot situational awareness through pupil tracking and allows engagement of targets at high angles off-boresight. The 30 kg (66 lb) oxygen generating system provides the pilot with unlimited oxygen supply. The life support system enables pilots to perform 9-g maneuvers for up to 30 seconds at a time, while the ejection seat and the new PPK-7 flight suit allows safe ejection at altitudes from 0 to 20,000 m (66,000 ft) and instrument airspeeds from 0 to 1,300 km/h (810 mph); the system also includes a survival kit to assist the pilot after ejection.

=== Avionics ===
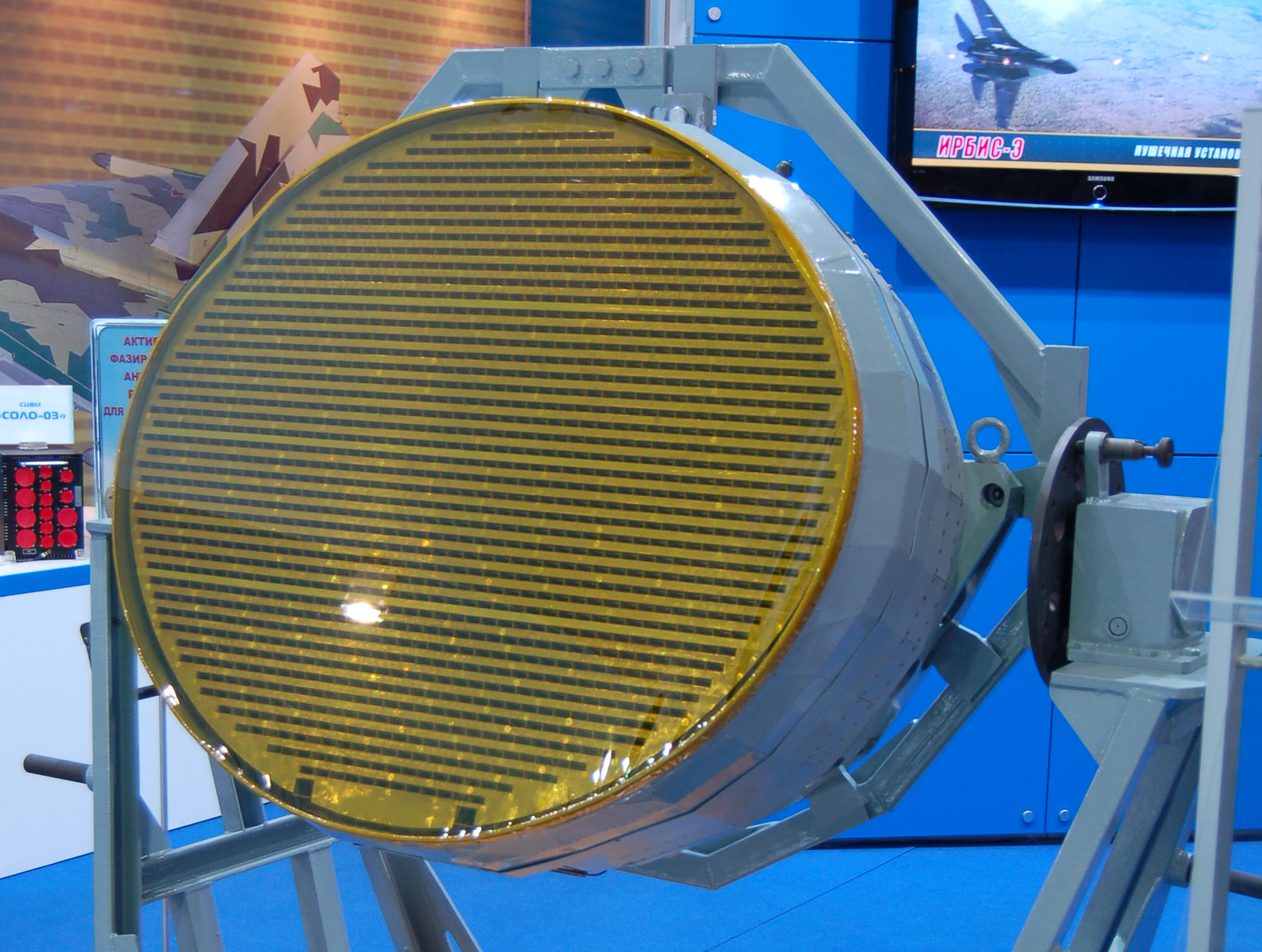
N036-1-01 X-band AESA radar

One of the main technical goals of the PAK FA programme is to achieve total integration of avionics systems, or sensor fusion, increase the pilot's situational awareness and reduce workload. Integration of the Su-57's onboard systems is controlled by an IUS (Russian: ИУС, short for: Информационно-управляющая система, lit. 'Information Management System'), with its computer system developed by GRPZ from Ryazan. The main avionics systems are the Sh-121 (Russian: Ш-121) multifunctional integrated radio electronic system (MIRES) and the 101KS "Atoll" (Russian: 101КС "Атолл") electro-optical system. In a departure from prior Sukhoi aircraft, the IUS systems integration was performed by Sukhoi itself rather than RPKB of Ramenskoye. The integrated avionics suite, called IMA BK (Russian: ИМА БК, short for: Интегрированной модульной авионики боевых комплексов, lit. 'Integrated Modular Avionics Combat Systems'), uses fibre optic channels and runs on over 4 million lines of code.

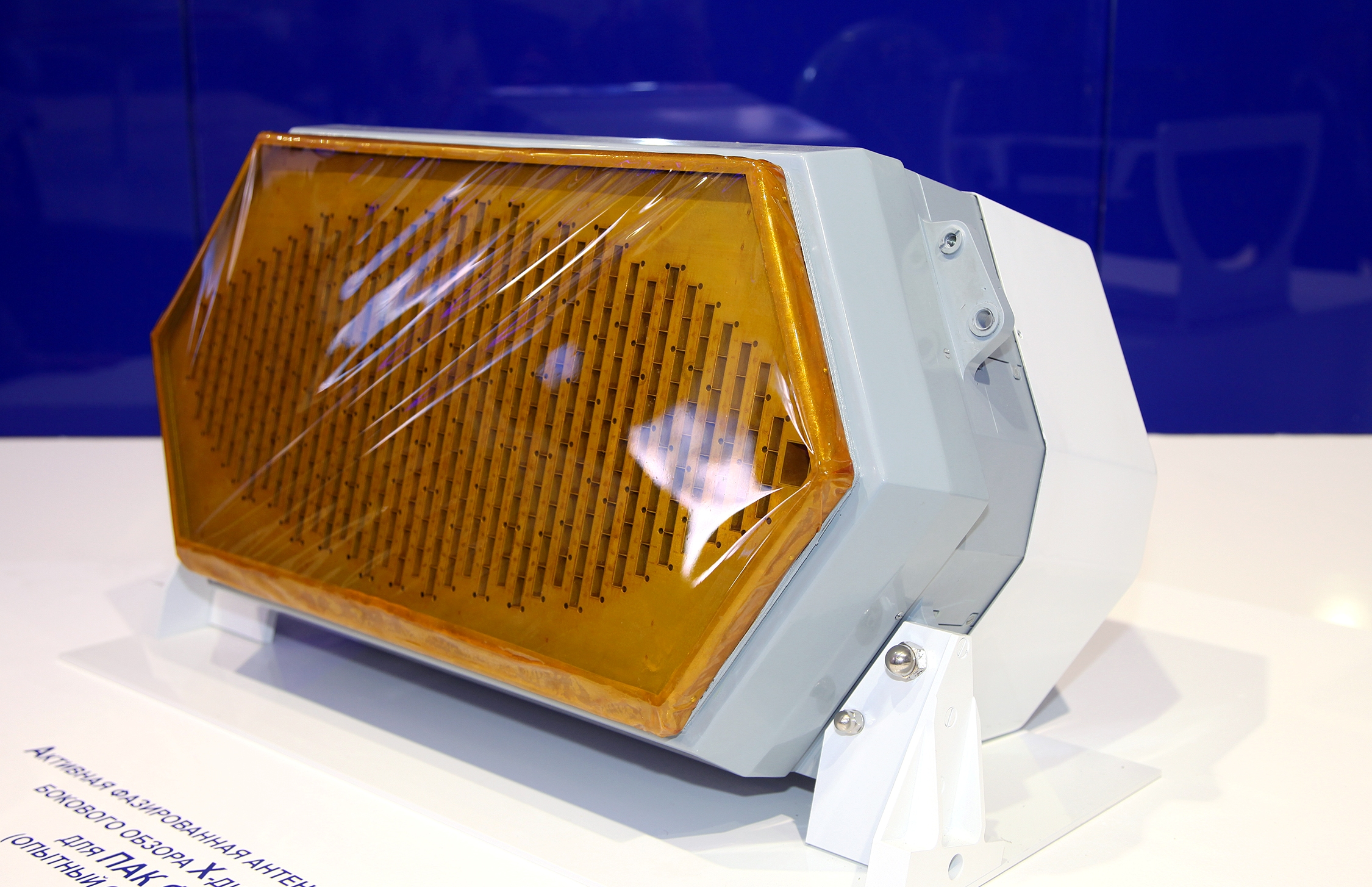
N036B-1-01 X-band AESA side-looking radar

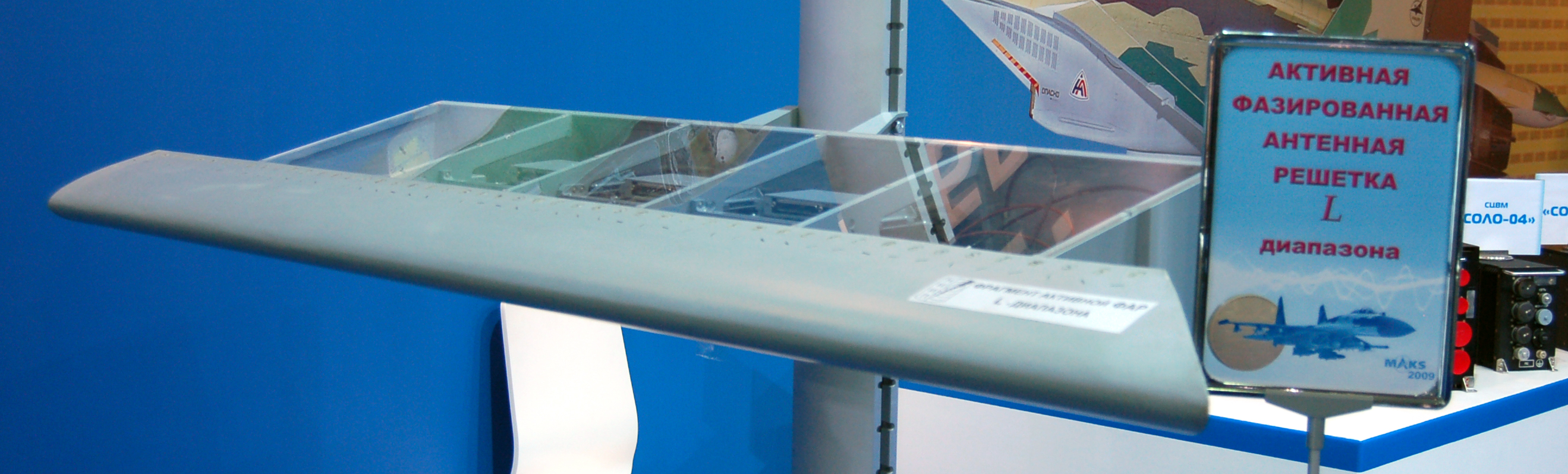
N036L-1-01 L-band array

The Sh-121 consists of the N036 Byelka radar system and L402 Himalayas electronic countermeasures (ECM) system. Developed by Tikhomirov NIIP Institute, the N036 consists of the main nose-mounted N036-1-01 X band active electronically scanned array (AESA) radar, or in Russian nomenclature, active phased array radar (Russian: АФАР, romanized: AFAR, short for: Активная фазированная антенная решётка), with 1,514 T/R modules and two side-looking N036B-1-01 X-band AESA radars with 404 T/R modules embedded in the cheeks of the forward fuselage for increased angular coverage. The nose antenna is tilted backwards for stealth. Moreover, the side-looking radar could enable the Su-57 to employ beaming tactics while still able to guide its own missile. The suite also has two N036L-1-01 L band transceivers on the wing's leading edge flaps that are not only used to handle the N036Sh Pokosnik (Reaper) friend-or-foe identification (IFF) system but also for electronic warfare purposes. Processing of the X- and L-band signals by the N036YeVS and GRPZ Solo-21 computers enable the system's information to be significantly enhanced. The L402 Himalayas ECM suite made by the Kaluga Research Radio Engineering Institute uses both its own arrays and the N036 radar system, with one of its arrays mounted in the dorsal sting between the two engines. Redundant radio telephone communication and encrypted data exchange among various aircraft and also command centers (ground and sea-based and airborne) are provided by the S-111 system, developed by Polyot.

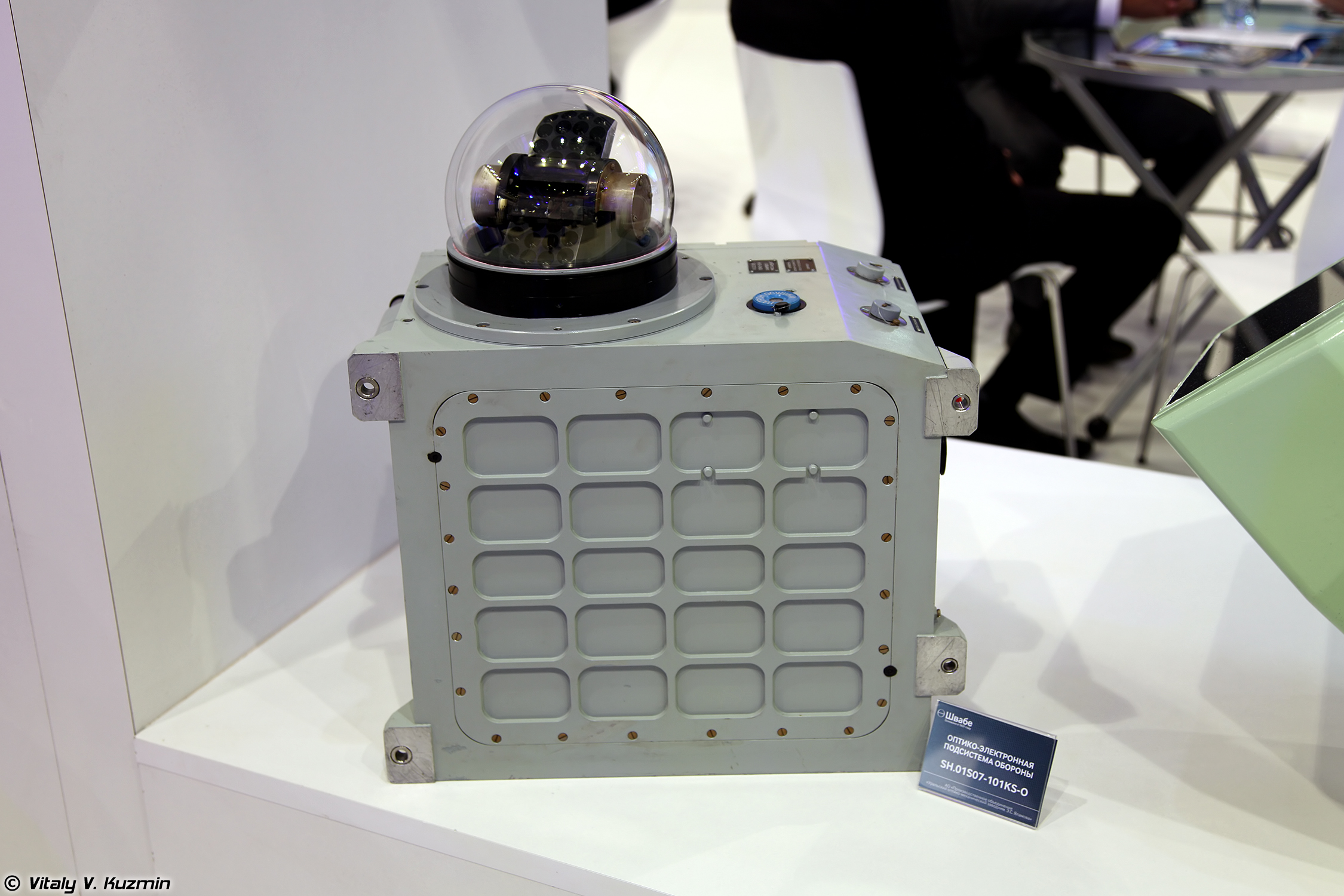
101KS-O DIRCM turret

The UOMZ 101KS "Atoll" electro-optical system consisted of the 101KS-V infrared search and track (IRST), 101KS-O directional infrared counter measures (DIRCM), 101KS-U ultraviolet missile approach warning sensors (MAWS), 101KS-P thermal imager for low altitude flight and landing, and 101KS-N navigation and targeting pod. The IRST turret is mounted on the starboard side in front of the cockpit and can track multiple targets simultaneously. When not in use, the receiver is turned backwards and its rear is treated with RAM to preserve stealth. Additionally, the Su-57 is the first fighter to mount a DIRCM system, with one turret mounted behind the canopy and another mounted under the cockpit. The aircraft is capable of deploying countermeasures such as flares and radar decoys, as well as single-use programmable ECM transmitters. The dispensers for these countermeasures are mounted in the tail boom between the engines.

For in-flight navigation, the Su-57 uses the BINS-SP2M inertial navigation system developed by Concern Radio-Electronic Technologies (KRET). The system can also integrate with GLONASS, and is controlled by the IVS-50 computing system. In 2016, KRET announced it is developing a multifunctional video processing system called "Okhotnik" (Hunter) to increase the Su-57's target detection range as well as to improve automatic detection and tracking of targets. A monitoring system allows real-time assessment of the aircraft's condition and predict the remaining 'life' of the composite parts of the aircraft by transmitting information through optical fibers, with sensitivity to mechanical influences, woven into the structure. This allows a more efficient maintenance and repair process. The Su-57 could also serve as a testbed for advanced AI and man-unmanned teaming technologies intended for use in a future sixth-generation fighter program. The aircraft has also tested autonomous flight without pilot input.

== Operational history ==
=== Russia ===
==== Testing and trials ====
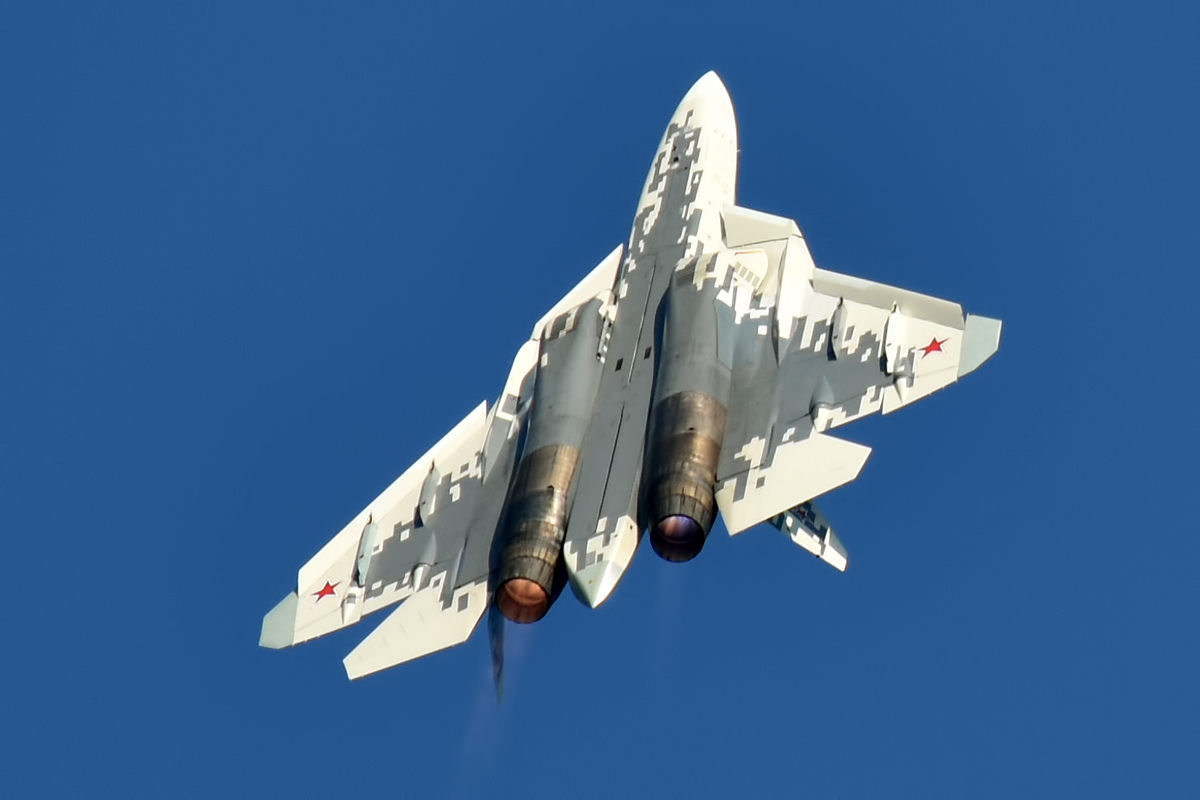
Su-57 flying upside down

Even before the first flight of the T-50 prototype, several subsystems were tested on other aircraft for validation and risk reduction; an Su-27M was used to test the AL-41F-1 engine on 21 January 2010, while another tested the KSU-50 flight control system. The T-50 prototype conducted its first high speed taxi run on 21 January 2010 and had its maiden flight several days later on 29 January 2010. First supersonic flight occurred on 14 March 2011 at a test range near Komsomolsk-on-Amur.

The Su-57 tests consisted of preliminary trials PI (Russian: ПИ, short for: Предварительные испытания) conducted by Sukhoi at the Gromov Flight Research Institute (LII, Russian: ЛИИ) at Zhukovsky, as well as two stages of joint state trials GSI (Russian: ГСИ, short for: Государственные совместные испытания) conducted by the Ministry of Defence at the 929th State Flight Test Centre (GLITs, Russian: ГЛИЦ) at Akhtubinsk. The completion of GSI-1 resulted in the acceptance of the aircraft's airworthiness, and the completion of GSI-2, which tests the mission systems and armaments, clears the Su-57 for operational service. The preliminary trials and state trials occurred with some overlap with each other.

Early flight tests revealed that the initial T-50 design had serious problems with structural strength and fatigue; when the first two prototypes were showcased publicly in MAKS-2011, the airframes cracked despite flying with a restrictive 5–g limit, which necessitated grounding and structural reinforcing for over a year as well as a "second stage" structural redesign. Of the ten flying and three non-flying T-50 prototypes, the three non-flying prototypes tested static flight loads, one each for "first stage" and "second stage" structures, and avionics integration. The first two flying prototypes tested flight characteristics and basic mechanical systems, and thus had no mission systems. Testing of mission systems such as the radar and electronic warfare suite began from the third prototype onwards, with each subsequent aircraft having slight variations in the arrangement of avionics and sensor systems. The final pre-production aircraft were equipped with full mission systems and tested the overall integrated avionics.

By February 2014, the first phase of preliminary trials, PI-1, had concluded; (Note: Conclusion of PI-1 in February 2014 saw envelope expansion to Mach 1.7, instrument airspeed of 1,000 km/h (620 mph), ceiling of 14,000 m (46,000 ft), and g-load of 6.5.) in the same month, the 929th GLITs received its first T-50 at Akhtubinsk for further testing and GSI state trials. However, severe issues were discovered during PI-1; in addition to the structural issues, the aircraft suffered from engine problems, including the AL-41F-1 compressor stall during the MAKS-2011 airshow. In June 2014, the fifth prototype was severely damaged by an in-flight fire and written off, and an incomplete "first stage" airframe was finished using parts salvaged from the fifth prototype. Both preliminary and state trials were delayed by the fire and the structural redesign; the second phase of preliminary trials, PI-2, ran from 2014 to 2019 and mainly used structurally reinforced "first stage" aircraft while GSI-1 was halted until 2016 in order to wait for the updated "second stage" airframes. Armament trials were also delayed, with external weapon trials starting in May 2014 and internal trials only starting in March 2016. GSI-1 was finished on 8 February 2018 with formal signing in May 2018. After more than 3,500 flights, GSI-2 was planned to be completed by 2019, but this was pushed to 2020, partly because of the crash of the first production aircraft in December 2019.

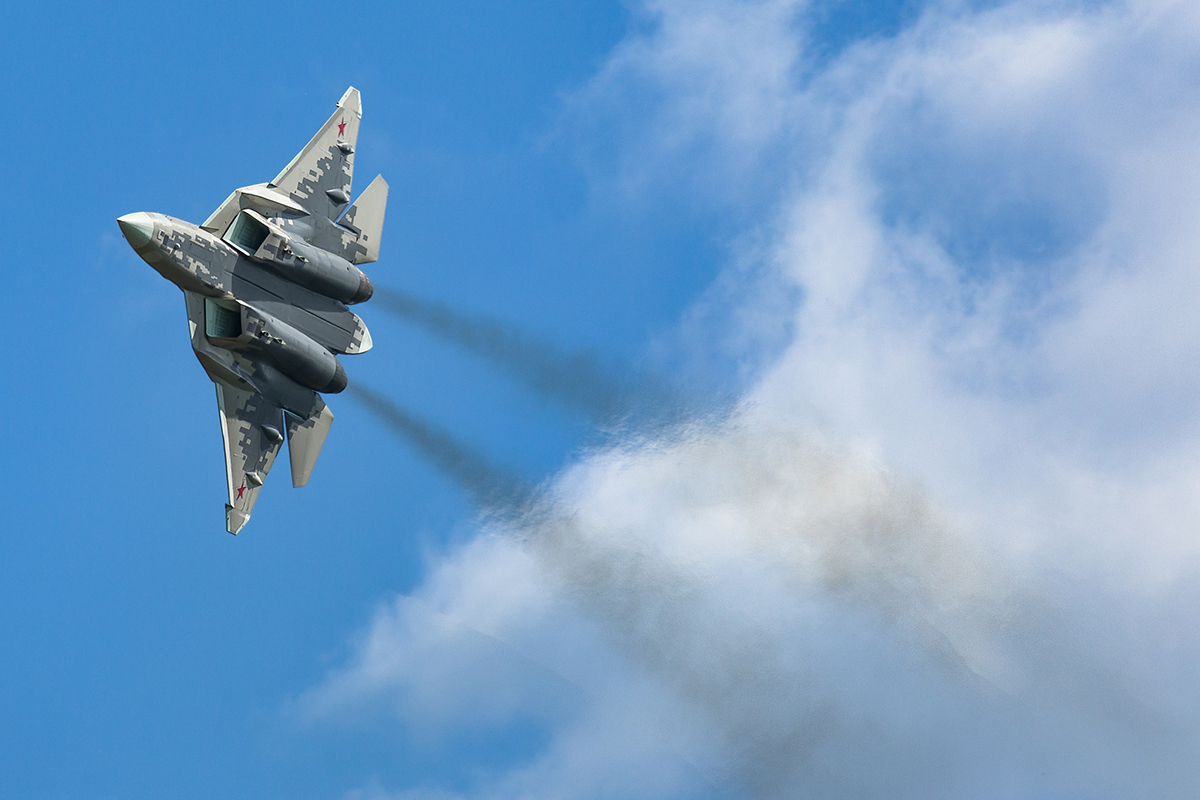
Su-57 solo display at ARMY-2020 forum

As the Su-57 is gradually being inducted into Russian military service, Sukhoi is testing upgrades for the improved Su-57M variant. First flight of the izdeliye 30 engine occurred on 5 December 2017 with the second prototype (T-50-2, bort no. 052). Prototypes were also used for unmanned aerial vehicle (UAV) teaming tests with the Okhotnik UCAV, with a video of flight tests released by the Ministry of Defence on 27 September 2019. On 28 June 2020, TASS, with reference to anonymous sources within the military-industrial complex, reported that a 'swarm' teaming experiment had been conducted with a group of Su-35s and an Su-57 acting as a command and control aircraft. The networked information exchange significantly increases the efficiency of combat missions. Reportedly, the experiment was conducted in "real combat conditions".

==== Syrian combat evaluation ====
On 21 February 2018, two Su-57s performed their first international flight as they were spotted landing at the Russian Khmeimim air base in Syria. The aircraft were deployed along with four Sukhoi Su-35 fighters, four Sukhoi Su-25s, and one Beriev A-50 AEW&C aircraft. Three days later two more Su-57s were reported to have arrived in Syria. The deployment was criticised by some experts as overly risky, especially after reports of drone attacks at Khmeimim air base, as well as having limited value due to the short duration of only several days. As the deployment overlapped with Russia's Defender of the Fatherland Day, the purpose may have been to support the president's state-of-the-nation speech. Additionally, deployment of the aircraft in a combat theatre may serve to enhance the aircraft's marketing. On 1 March 2018, the Russian Defence Minister Sergey Shoygu stated that the two Su-57s had spent two days in Syria and successfully completed a trials program, including combat trials during which parameters of weapons work were monitored. On 25 May 2018, the Defence Ministry disclosed that during the February 2018 deployment to Syria, a Su-57 fired a cruise missile in combat, likely a Kh-59MK2. On 18 November 2018, the Defence Ministry posted an extended video of the fighters' flights, and announced that Su-57 performed 10 flights during its deployment to Syria. However, the video did not specify when the test flights took place.

In December 2019, the Chief of the Russian General Staff, Valery Gerasimov, announced that Russian Defence Ministry had once again tested the Su-57 in Syria, and all tasks had been successfully fulfilled.

==== Entry into service ====
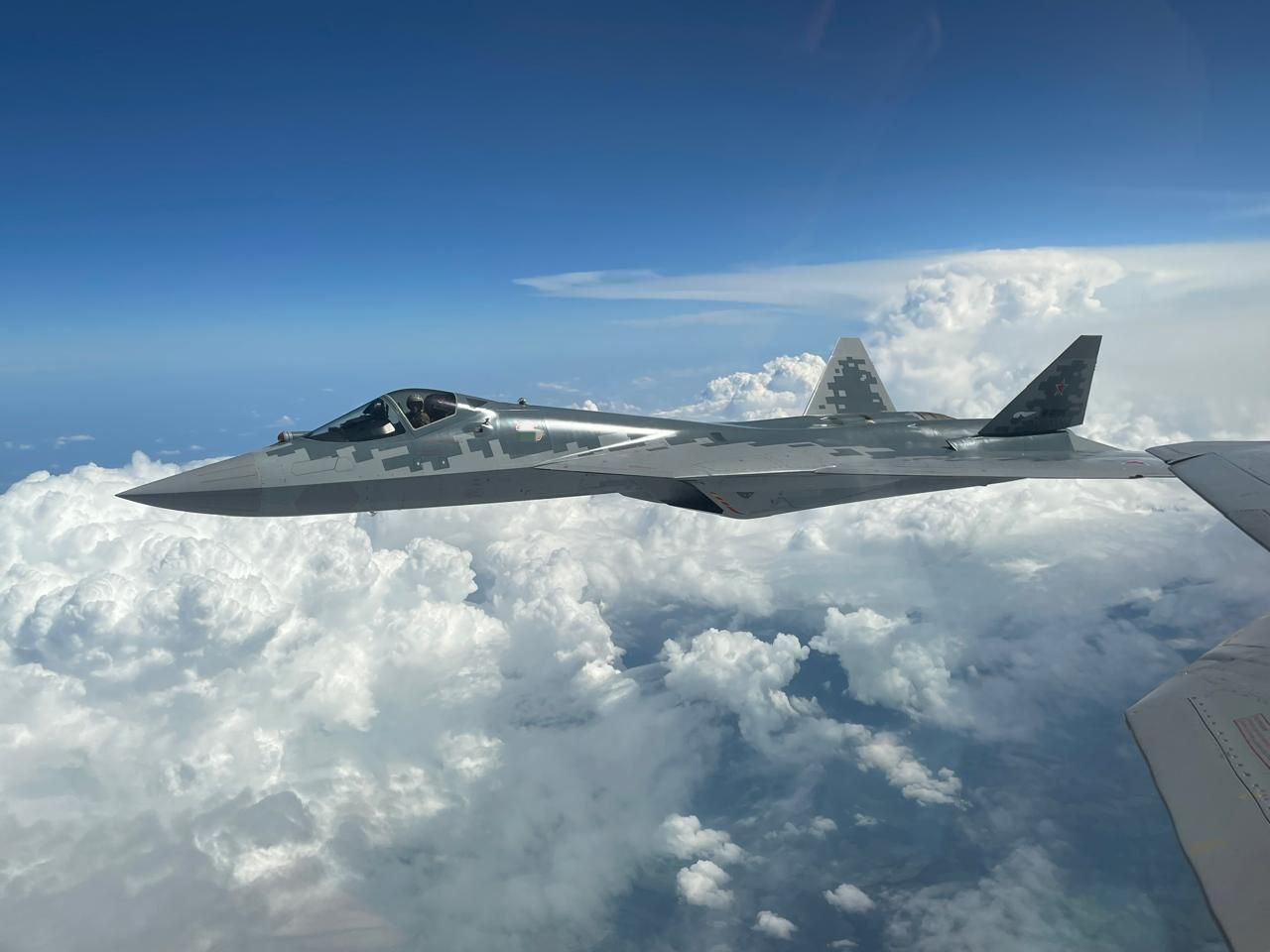
A serial production Su-57 flying in formation, 2025

On 25 December 2020, the Russian Defence Ministry announced that the Su-57 had entered service upon the delivery of the first production aircraft to one of the aviation regiments of the Southern Military District at Lipetsk. This initial production batch would be used for military evaluation, tactics development, and crew conversion training. The first operational unit to be equipped with the Su-57 is the 23rd Guards Fighter Aviation Regiment based in Dzyomgi in the Eastern Military District, with deliveries to begin in 2023; the colocation of the unit with the KnAAZ aircraft manufacturing plant enables easier support for newly introduced aircraft. The first fully operational Su-57 regiment of 24 aircraft is expected to be equipped by 2025.

==== Use in Ukraine ====
In May 2022, Russian sources claimed that Su-57 fighters were used two or three weeks after the start of the 2022 Russian invasion of Ukraine, striking targets with missiles outside of the zone of activity of Ukrainian air defenses, just like other Russian aircraft that are also restricted mainly to Russian airspace.

In June 2022, RIA Novosti reported four Su-57s working in a network were used in SEAD role over Ukraine to identify and destroy Ukrainian air defense systems. The source also noted that its low radar visibility was demonstrated in combat.

On 19 October 2022, Russian army general Sergey Surovikin, then commander of all Russian Armed Forces in Ukraine, claimed that the Su-57 has been used both in air-to-air and air-to-ground role during the war in Ukraine and that it has scored kills in both roles. Subsequently, some Russian sources claimed the Su-57 shot down a Ukrainian Su-27 fighter and a Su-24 strike fighter with long-range R-37 missiles. However, while some Su-57s are based in Lipetsk and Akhtubinsk air bases for development and trials, no hard evidence for claims of combat has surfaced.

On 18 February 2024, a Su-57 escorted by a pair of Su-35 fighters launched a missile strike against Ukrainian targets using a stealthy Kh-69 cruise missile. The aircraft operated above the Luhansk Oblast.

In May 2024, Ukrainian sources reported that Russia intensified the use of Su-57 fighters to strike targets in Ukraine. Air strikes were reportedly carried out from the airspace of Kursk, Bryansk and occupied Luhansk oblasts, using the latest Kh-69 cruise missiles.

On 9 June 2024, the Ukrainian Main Directorate of Intelligence claimed to have damaged or destroyed two Russian Su-57 fighter jets, using drones during a strike on the Akhtubinsk air base in Astrakhan Oblast. Several Telegram channels affiliated with the Russian military confirmed the attack and that at least one Su-57 was damaged by shrapnel, while also criticizing the lack of protective hangars for the aircraft. Further information about the strike was added by the Russian Telegram channel Fighterbomber, added that the state of the aircraft is currently being examined which would determine whether or not it can be repaired. Maxar Technologies satellite imagery showed a crater next to a Su-57 at Akhtubinsk.

On 5 October 2024, a Su-57 used an air-to-air missile to deliberately shoot down an out of control Russian Sukhoi S-70 Okhotnik-B drone over Ukraine about 10 miles (16 km) behind Ukrainian lines.

According to The National Interest in November 2024, Russia was reluctant to send the Su-57 into combat, but may find a need to as Russian jet losses continue to mount faster than they can be replaced.

In May 2026, the Su-57 returned to combat, conducting at least ten cruise missile launches in operations over Kursk Oblast, the Sea of Azov, and Crimea.

=== Algeria ===
On 27 December 2019, Algeria signed a contract for 14 aircraft as part of large military deal that also includes the purchase of Su-34 and Su-35 fighters. This decision was reportedly taken in summer 2019, when Algerian delegation personally inspected the Su-57 at the MAKS-2019 air show. Algeria confirmed the acquisition and set to receive the first Su-57E in 2025. Reports suggest that they could arrive to Algeria by the end of 2026. On 18 November 2025, the CEO of Russia's United Aircraft Corporation claimed that the first two Su-57s have been delivered to a foreign customer and entered combat duty, without specifying the customer. According to estimates, the customer is likely Algeria. Visual evidence of the delivery was provided in February 2026.

=== Potential operators ===
Sukhoi states that the main export advantage of the PAK FA is its lower cost than current US fifth generation jet fighters. As of 2024, no Su-57 fighters have been exported. Furthermore, it has been reported that the export models of the fighter are unlikely to be available until the end of the decade, despite production allegedly slated to be increased in 2024. The war in Ukraine and the imposed sanctions have also further reduced Russia's ability to continue the development of its advanced fighter jets like the Su-57 and the Su-75. Russian news agency TASS, citing state arms seller Rosoboronexport's CEO Alexander Mikheyev, reported that at the 2024 Zhuhai air show there were contracts to deliver SU-57s to unspecified foreign nations.

==== Vietnam ====
It has been reported that Vietnam may become a customer of the Su-57. The country is expected to acquire the fighters to replace its aging fleet of 11 Su-27s. On 9 July 2021, Vietnam announced its intention to buy Su-57 aircraft, but it is critical of the aircraft's workmanship.

==== Iraq ====
In 2021, Russian media stated that Iraqi military leadership including its inspector for the Iraqi Ministry of Defence Imad Al-Zuhairin stated the country's interest in the Su-57, although no formal negotiations have occurred.

Kazakhstan

Kazakhstan was alleged to have investigated the Su-57 in late August 2026 as a replacement for their Su-27s, and was looking to acquire them within two years.

==== India ====
In the early stages of the PAK FA programme, India had planned to be one of the largest foreign customers by procuring the FGFA derivative. It originally planned on buying 166 single-seat and 48 two-seat fighters, but later changed it to 214 single-seat fighters, and later reduced its purchase to 144 fighters by 2012. In April 2018, India pulled out of the FGFA project, which it believed did not meet its requirements for stealth, combat avionics, radars and sensors by that time. Indian Air Force Air Chief Marshal Birender Singh Dhanoa, during an interview with Russian Ministry of Defence's official newspaper Krasnaya Zvezda (Red Star), stated that the Su-57 is currently not being considered for the service, but the aircraft can be evaluated once it enters service with the Russian Aerospace Forces. The General Director of the United Aircraft Corporation Yuri Slyusar however denied the previous reports saying "the topic is not closed" and that Russia and India are still discussing the creation of the fifth-generation fighter. However, in October 2019, the Indian Air Force Chief of Air Staff RKS Bhadauria stated that the country will not be importing stealth fighters like the Su-57, and will instead focus on indigenous efforts such as the HAL AMCA.

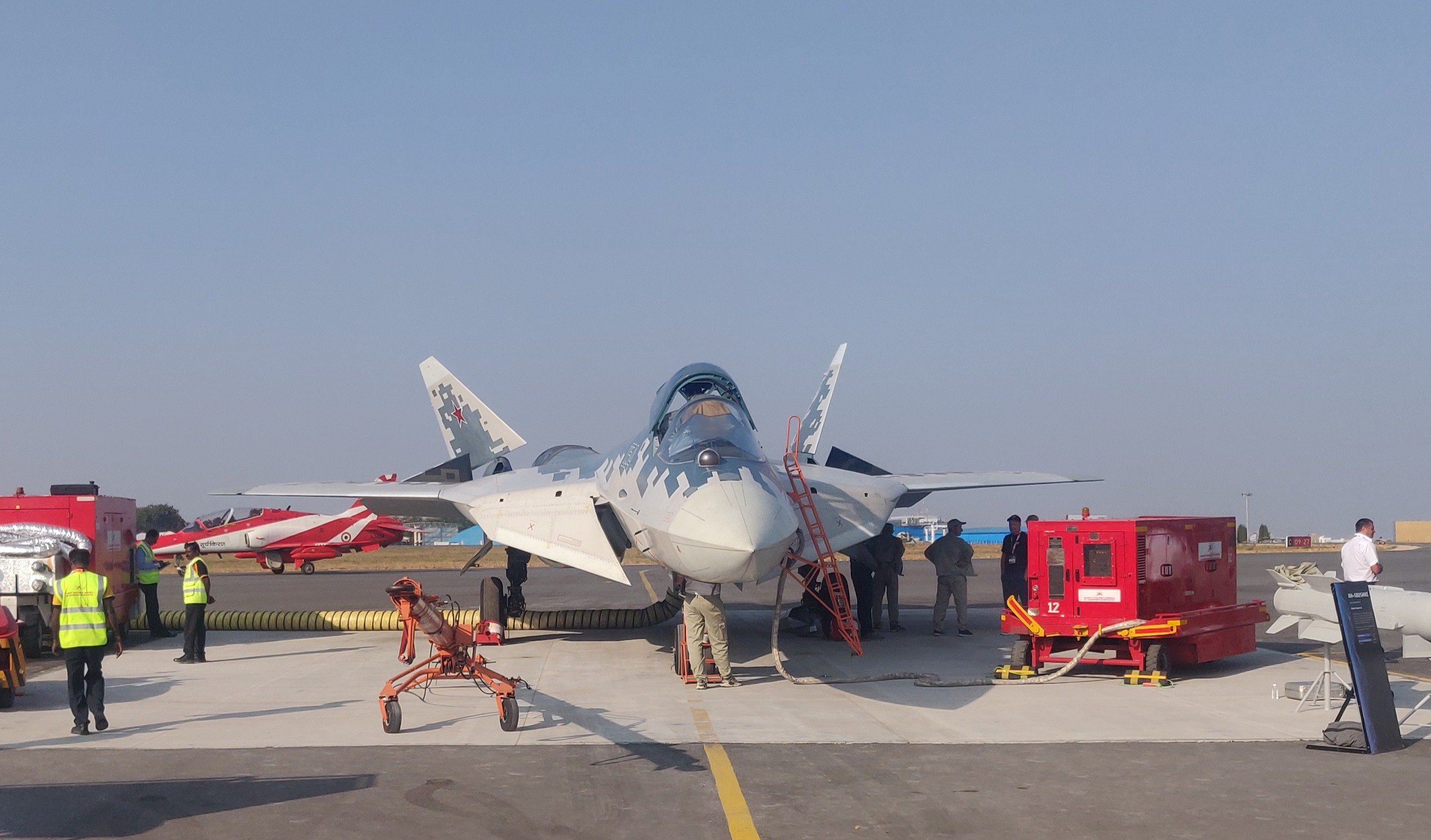
Su-57E at Aero India 2025

On 11 February 2025, it was reported during the Aero India 2025 airshow that Rosoboronexport, along with United Aircraft Corporation (UAC), has unofficially offered the Sukhoi Su-57E variant for the Indian Air Force. Reuters, citing a Russian industry source and an Indian defence official, reported that the jet was offered to be manufactured in India in collaboration with the Hindustan Aeronautics Limited (HAL) at its Nashik plant with 100% transfer of technology. The production could begin in 2025 itself under a long-term cooperation along with partnership for upgradation of the aircraft.

On 23 September, ThePrint reported that India is evaluating the procurement of Su-57, though not as a fifth-generation stealth aircraft but as a stopgap measure and a long-range strike platform, with a requirement of two squadrons directly from Russia. India could further acquire 3–5 squadrons Made in India Su-57s. The entire plan, however, is at a preliminary stage. A Russian technical team compromising of officials from the Sukhoi Design Bureau and other authorities conducted a tour of the HAL's production facilities, including the Nashik division, Koraput division and Strategic Electronics Factory, in September. The team then submitted a report to HAL in October, two months ahead of the state visit of the Russian president, Vladimir Putin, to India. As per the report, HAL's infrastructure are compatible with 50% of Su-57E's production requirements. Now, HAL is reportedly undertaking another assessment as to the additional investments required in infrastructure, advanced technologies, R&D, human resources, and supply chain development to establish the Su-57 production line in India. The report on the same is expected to be submitted to the Indian Ministry of Defence by the end of November.

=== Failed bids ===
==== South Korea ====
Russia was reported to be offering the PAK FA for South Korea's next generation jet fighter. South Korea's Defense Acquisition Program Administration (DAPA) stated that the Sukhoi PAK FA was a candidate for the Republic of Korea Air Force's next-generation fighter (F-X Phase 3) aircraft; however, Sukhoi did not submit a bid by the January 2012 deadline.

==== Brazil ====
In 2013, Russia offered Brazil participation and joint production in a next-generation fighter based on the Su-57. Instead of Russian Su-57 and French Rafale, Brazil signed an agreement with the Swedish Saab Group to locally produce 36 Gripen E fighters for the Brazilian Air Force.

==== Turkey ====
In May 2019, as Turkish participation in the F-35 program was in doubt due to Turkey's procurement of the S-400 missile system, CEO of Rostec Sergey Chemezov said that Russia was ready to cooperate with Turkey on the export and local production of the Su-57. On 14 September 2019, an Su-57 took part in the 2019 Technofest festival held in Istanbul. However, on 7 February 2020, President Erdogan announced that the replacement of the F-35 will not be Russian Su-57, but instead will be the Turkish domestic fifth-generation aircraft TF-X fighter.

==== United Arab Emirates ====
Russia has offered Su-57E fighters to the United Arab Emirates during IDEX 2021. During the 2019 Dubai Airshow, Chemezov talked about the possibility of "localization" of portions of the Su-57 supply chain within other countries that decide to buy those jets, including "United Arab Emirates, India or Turkey", depends on the capabilities of the defense industrial base of the customer in question. However, the UAE has refrained from signing a contract with Russia to avoid CAATSA sanctions from the United States.

== Variants ==
Su-57
Production variant for the Russian Aerospace Forces. Flight testing began with the T-50 prototype in 2010, and serial production began in 2019. A total of three regiments, 76 aircraft, are planned with the first aircraft delivered in December 2020.

Su-57E
Export version of Su-57, with the primary differences being a different IFF, flight instrument software adjusted to display readings in Imperial units, and the cockpit labeled in English; non-Russian weapons can also be integrated as requested. Rosoboronexport is marketing the aircraft as Perspective multirole fighter (PMF).

Su-57D
Two-seat variant of the Su-57, with the rear cockpit missionized to allow the aircraft to be both a trainer and also support a weapon systems officer (WSO).

=== Proposed variants ===
Su-57M
Upgraded variant of the base Su-57 under the program name Megapolis, and incorporates improved mission systems, reliability and maintenance enhancements, new flight control actuators, and the Saturn AL-51F-1 engines, or potentially the izdeliye 177. Flight testing of components began in 2022, and serial production is planned for the mid-2020s.

FGFA

Sukhoi/HAL FGFA was a planned version of Su-57 for Indian Air Force but India withdrew from the FGFA programme in 2018 before any prototype was built. The FGFA was intended to be the primary export version of the PAK FA and was to differ in 43 ways with improvements to stealth, supercruise, sensors, networking, and combat avionics. There were conflicting reports on the FGFA, with India detailing numerous improvements over the baseline PAK FA, while Mikhail Pogosyan, the head of United Aircraft Corporation, said in 2013 that the PAK FA and the FGFA will use "identical onboard systems and avionics". India has refrained from signing a deal with Russia citing concerns over shared manufacturing, technology, and maintenance. According to the same source, India also had questions about development of the aircraft's stealth, radar and supercruise capability at the time, and ultimately withdrew from the programme in 2018.

=== Other versions ===
In 2008, UAC president Alexei Fedorov has said that any decision on applying fifth-generation technologies to produce a smaller fighter (comparable to the F-35) must wait until after the development of the PAK FA is completed.

A naval version of the Su-57 was proposed for the Project 23000 or Storm supercarrier. Models of the aircraft carrier project are showing Su-57 on board, with folding wings and stabilators. The Su-57 should be able to use the takeoff ramp as well as the Electromagnetic Aircraft Launch System. The draft of the future state armament program (GVP) for 2024–2033 includes the development of a new carrier-based fighter based on the Su-57, albeit with deep modifications.

The aircraft is used as a testbed for integration with UAVs as well as various subsystems (including weapon, control and navigation systems) being developed for Russia's future sixth-generation combat system, both in manned and unmanned version. In January 2019, it was reported the third flyable Su-57 prototype (bort. no 053) is being used for interaction with the Sukhoi S-70 Okhotnik UCAV, and testing of its avionics systems.

== Operators ==
Algeria

- Algerian Air Force – 2 delivered. The first batch was delivered in November 2025.

Russia

- Russian Aerospace Forces – 10 prototypes and 21 production aircraft in service as of December 2023 out of a total order of 76 production aircraft. Seven aircraft were delivered in 2024 in three batches. Two more aircraft were delivered in April 2025. According to the Russian state-owned defense conglomerate Rostec, a new batch with upgraded systems was delivered in February 2026. The number of aircraft delivered was not disclosed. According to the manufacturer, a second batch of the new technical configuration which reportedly includes a new pilot's head-up display and more infrared sensors was delivered in September 2026.

== Accidents ==
On 10 June 2014, the fifth flying prototype, aircraft T-50-5, was severely damaged by an engine fire after landing. The pilot managed to escape unharmed. The aircraft was subsequently written off, and its salvageable parts were cannibalized to finish the sixth "first stage" prototype, which was then given the fifth prototype's bort number and its designation changed from T-50-6-1 to T-50-5R. However, official accounting still considers the two aircraft to be the "same" one.

On 24 December 2019, the first serial Su-57 (bort number "01 blue") crashed 110–120 km (68–75 mi) away from the Dzyomgi Airport, Khabarovsk Krai, during the final stage of its factory trials due to a control system malfunction. The pilot ejected and was recovered by helicopter. According to TASS, the test flight took place at an altitude of 8,000 metres (26,000 ft) when the malfunction occurred, causing the airplane to enter a rapid spiral descent. When all attempts to stabilize the airplane into a horizontal flight using the manual flight control system failed, the pilot ejected at an altitude of 2,000 metres (6,600 ft).

On 23 July 2026, Kommersant reported that a Su-57 had crashed during a training flight near Kubinka, Moscow Oblast. It was reported that the pilot safely ejected, and no ground casualties were reported. A Russian specialist closely associated with Sukhoi suggested that the aircraft had suffered a dual engine failure at low altitude. The Ukrainian site InformNapalm, claimed that a Ukrainian cyber attack may have resulted in friendly fire from Russian air defences, while the Russian Ministry of Defence said a "technical failure" was responsible for the crash.

On 29 October 2026, Militarnyi reported that a Su-57 at the Akhtubinsk Air Base caught fire and was totally destroyed after "an abnormal incident during engine startup". It is the fourth Su-57 to be lost this year due to accidents or combat.

== Specifications (Su-57E) ==
Sukhoi T-50 3-view drawings

Data from Rosoboronexport, United Aircraft Corporation, Aviation Week, Key Aero, Crecy Publishing

General characteristics

- Crew: 1
- Length: 20.1 m (65 ft 11 in)
- Wingspan: 14.1 m (46 ft 3 in)
- Height: 4.6 m (15 ft 1 in)
- Wing area: 78.8 m^{2} (848 sq ft)
- Empty weight: 18,500 kg (40,786 lb)
- Gross weight: 26,700 kg (58,863 lb) normal takeoff weight, 29,800 kg (65,700 lb) at full load
- Max takeoff weight: 34,000 kg (74,957 lb)
- Fuel capacity: 9,700 kg (21,385 lb) internal, 12,900 kg (28,440 lb) with 2× PTB-2000 2,000 L (528 US gal) drop tanks
- Powerplant: 2 × Saturn AL-41F-1 afterburning turbofan, 88.3 kN (19,900 lbf) thrust each dry, 142.2 kN (32,000 lbf) with afterburner, 147.1 kN (33,100 lbf) in emergency power

Performance

- Maximum speed: Mach 2.0, 2,135 km/h (1,153 kn; 1,327 mph) at high altitude
  - Mach 1.1, 1,350 km/h (729 kn; 839 mph) at sea level
- Supercruise: Mach 1.3, 1,400 km/h (756 kn; 870 mph) supercruise at high altitude
- Range: 2,800 km (1,700 mi, 1,500 nmi) subsonic
  - 1,500 km (932 mi; 810 nmi) supersonic
- Combat range: 1,250 km (780 mi, 670 nmi)
- Ferry range: 4,000 km (2,500 mi, 2,200 nmi) with 2 outboard fuel tanks
- Service ceiling: 18,800 m (61,700 ft)
- g limits: +9.0
- Wing loading: 371 kg/m^{2} (76 lb/sq ft) normal takeoff weight
- Thrust/weight: 1.09 at normal takeoff weight (0.97 at loaded weight with full fuel)

Armament

- Guns: 1 × 30 mm Gryazev-Shipunov GSh-30-1 autocannon
- Hardpoints: 12 hardpoints (6 × internal, 6 × external) with a capacity of 7,500 kilograms (16,500 lb) maximum payload
- Missiles:
  - Air-to-air missiles:
    - R-77M
    - R-74M2
    - R-37 (missile)
  - Air-to-surface missiles:
    - 4 × Kh-38M
    - 4 × Kh-69
    - S-71K Kovyor
  - Anti-ship missiles:
    - 2 × Kh-35U
    - 2 × Kh-31
  - Anti-radiation missiles:
    - 4 × Kh-58UShK
- Bombs:
  - KAB-250 guided bomb
  - KAB-500 guided bomb
  - "Drill" anti-tank 500 kg cluster bomb with active homing

Avionics

- Sh-121 multifunctional integrated radio electronic system (MIRES) (Note: The Su-57E export variant would have a different avionics arrangement compared to the baseline Su-57, particularly regarding the IFF, cockpit instrumentation, and certain fire control modes.)
  - Byelka radar (400 km, 60 tracks with 16 targeted)
    - N036-1-01: Frontal X-band active electronically scanned array (AESA) radar
    - N036B-1-01: Cheek X-band AESA radars for increased angular coverage
    - N036L-1-01: Slat L-band arrays for IFF
  - L402 Himalayas electronic countermeasure suite
- 101KS Atoll electro-optical targeting system
  - 101KS-O: Laser directional infrared counter measures
  - 101KS-V: Infrared search and track
  - 101KS-U: Ultraviolet missile approach warning system
  - 101KS-N: Targeting pod
  - 101KS-P: Thermal imager for low altitude flying and night landing

== Notable appearances in media ==
The Su-57 appears in the 2022 film Top Gun: Maverick as the aircraft used by the unnamed hostile nation, where it is referred to as a "fifth-generation fighter". The Su-57 is a flyable aircraft in several entries of the aerial combat game series Ace Combat.

== See also ==
Related development

- Sukhoi Su-75 Checkmate

Aircraft of comparable role, configuration, and era

- Chengdu J-20
- Lockheed Martin F-22
- Lockheed Martin F-35
- TAI TF Kaan

Related lists

- List of military aircraft of the Soviet Union and the CIS
- List of fighter aircraft
