= Saturn AL-51 =

Russian turbofan engine

AL-51
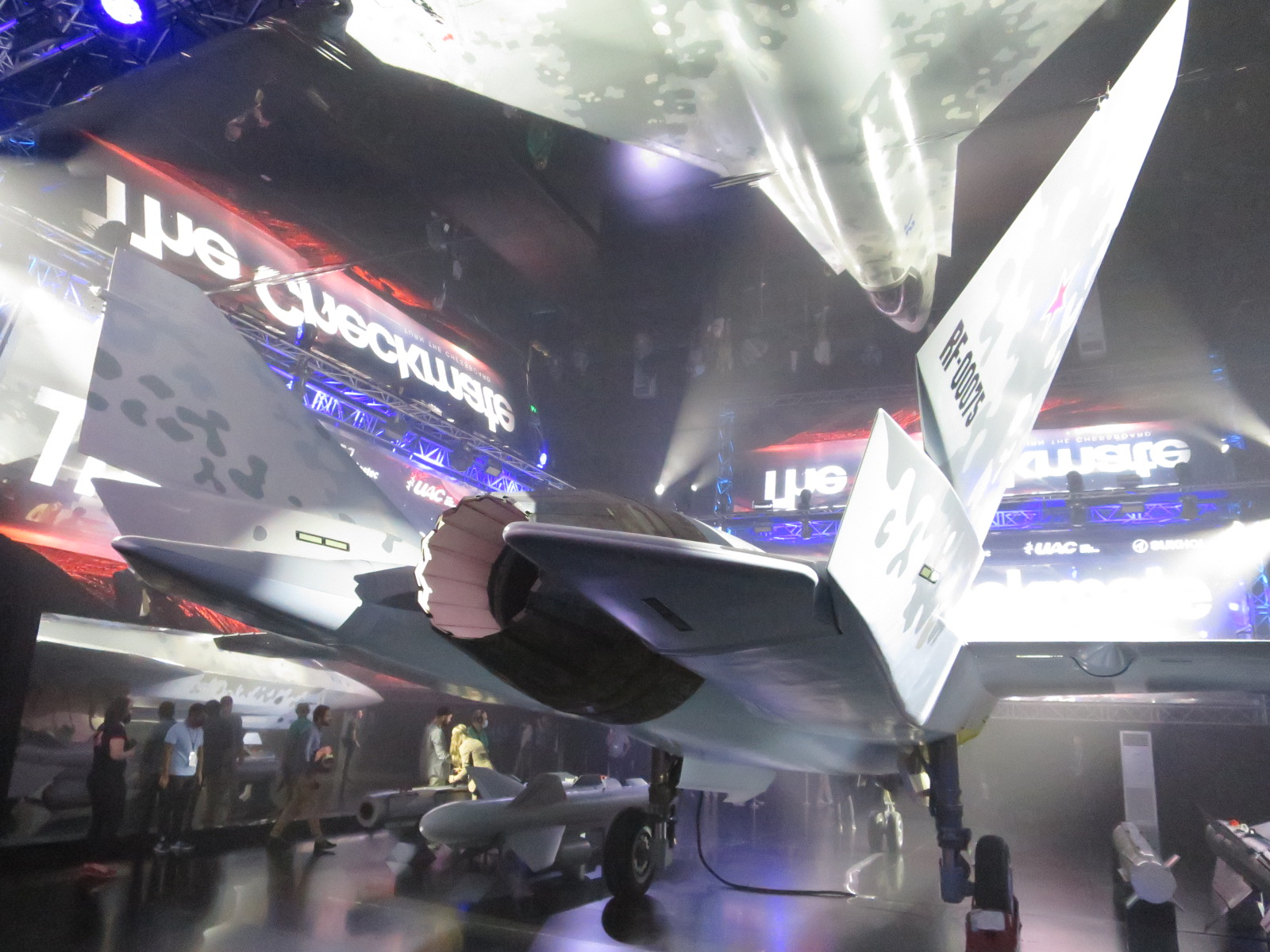
- The AL-51F-1 on an LTS Checkmate mock-up at MAKS 2021.
- Type: Turbofan
- National origin: Russia
- Manufacturer: NPO Saturn, UMPO
- First run: 2016
- Major applications: Sukhoi Su-57M (planned); Sukhoi Su-75 Checkmate

The Saturn AL-51, (Note: Russian: АЛ-51 or fully the АЛ-51Ф-1 for the AL-51F-1) internal development designation izdeliye 30, (Note: The Russian term изделие, translit. izdeliye literally means "manufactured article" or "product".) is an afterburning low-bypass turbofan engine being developed by NPO Saturn to succeed the Saturn AL-41F-1 for improved variants of the Sukhoi Su-57, as well as new potential tactical fighters such as the Sukhoi Su-75 Checkmate.

== Development ==
In the 1990s, the collapse of the Soviet Union resulted in the disruption of funding and lengthy delays of the Mikoyan Project 1.44 for the MFI (Mnogofunksionalni Frontovoy Istrebitel, "Multifunctional Frontline Fighter") fifth-generation fighter program along with its engines, the variable cycle 18–tonne (177 kN, 40,000 lbf) class NPO Lyulka-Saturn AL-41F, internally designated izdeliye 20. In 1999, as the MFI and LFI programs were gradually being abandoned, the Russian Defence Ministry initiated the more affordable PAK FA next-generation fighter program to replace the MiG-29 and Su-27. The competition was announced in April 2001, and Sukhoi submitted its T-50 proposal with a pair of 14.5-tonne (142 kN, 32,000 lbf) class Lyulka-Saturn AL-41F1, internally designated izdeliye 117, for the PAK FA. Sukhoi was selected as the winner of the competition in April 2002 and in April 2004, it signed a contract with Lyulka-Saturn, now NPO Saturn, to develop the AL-41F1. Despite its name, the engine is actually a highly uprated and improved variant of the earlier-generation Lyulka AL-31, originally designed for the Su-27. While the AL-41F1 used the same basic architecture as the AL-31, it had 80% new parts and applied technology from Lyulka-Saturn's original AL-41F, which was too large for the T-50.

Although Sukhoi specified the AL-41F1 in the contract, the bureau anticipates that its T-50 design, eventually designated the Su-57, would be the basis for a family of stealth combat aircraft, with future variants employing more powerful engines. Following a competition between NPO Saturn and MMPP Salyut, the former was selected to develop the new engine, a clean-sheet design designated the izdeliye 30, that would equip the improved Su-57M variant in the mid-2020s. Compared to the AL-41F1, the new powerplant will have increased thrust, lower costs, better fuel efficiency, and fewer moving parts; the engine also has glass-fibre plastic inlet guide-vanes (IGV) and a new nozzle with serrated flaps to reduce the aircraft's radar signature. Those features, along with subsequently improved reliability and lower maintenance costs will improve the aircraft performance and reliability. The izdeliye 30 is designed to have fewer stages than the AL-41F1 and be up to 18% more effective. Full scale development began in 2011 and the engine's compressor began bench testing in December 2014. The first test engines were completed in 2016. The new powerplant is designed to be a drop-in replacement for the AL-41F1 with minimal changes to the airframe.

First flight of the engine on an Su-57 prototype occurred on 5 December 2017 with the second prototype (T-50-2, bort no. 052). However, the engine’s development has seen a sluggish flight test pace; originally planned to enter service in the early 2020s, the izdeliye 30’s planned introduction has been delayed to the mid-2020s. In 2023, the engine was given the designation AL-51, with the base variant as the AL-51F-1. In early December 2024, the first known testing of AL-51F-1 with a new 2D thrust vectoring nozzle was done using the second prototype of T-50. The 17-minute test flight saw Sukhoi chief test pilot Sergei Bogdan flying the T-50-2 prototype from the M.M. Gromov flight test center, in Zhukovsky.

=== izdeliye 177 ===
Technology from the AL-51F-1 has been combined with existing AL-41F-1 derivatives to create a new hybrid variant called izdeliye 177 and 177S (not to be confused with the existing 117 and 117S), designed in 2023-24. Rostec claims the izdeliye 177S achieves the thrust of the AL-41F-1S (117S) while having better fuel economy and lifespan of 6,000 hours, and can replace existing AL-31F variants on Su-30, Su-34, and Su-35. During Dubai Air Show 2025, not only the Su-57 performed flight demo which exposed its side weapon bay for the first time, UAC also unveiled the new engine, claimed to have maximum afterburner thrust of 14,500 kgf and a maximum dry thrust 9,000 kgf, with a minimum specific fuel consumption lower than 0.67 kg/kgf x h. The dry mass of the engine is 1,530 kg, with an inlet diameter of 905 mm. The izdeliye 177 is intended for the Su-57, and is claimed to have maximum afterburner thrust of 16,000 kgf (157 kN, 35,300 lbf) and a maximum dry thrust 11,000 kgf (108 kN, 24,300 lbf), while achieving the same fuel economy as the 177S. The displayed scaled model of the Su-57 featured two-dimensional (2D) thrust-vectoring engine nozzle configuration meant to reduce radar and thermal signature.

== Design ==
The AL-51F-1 is a two-shaft low-bypass afterburning turbofan engine. The architecture is a three-stage fan driven by a single-stage low pressure turbine and five-stage high pressure compressor driven by single-stage high pressure turbine. Unlike its AL-41F1 predecessor, the engine has glass-fiber plastic IGVs and convergent-divergent nozzles that use serrated flaps to reduce its radar signature as well as 19% higher thrust-to-weight ratio, 6.4% better specific thrust, and 9% lower specific fuel consumption; estimated thrust is 107.9 kN (24,300 lbf) dry and 161.8 kN (36,400 lbf) in afterburner. The AL-51F-1 has full authority digital engine control (FADEC) to ensure its reliability in various operating conditions.

== Applications ==
- Sukhoi Su-57M (planned)
- Sukhoi Su-75 Checkmate (planned, derivative)

== Specifications (AL-51F-1) ==
Data from Key Aero, Aviation Week, NPO Saturn and UMPO

==== General characteristics ====
- Type: Two-shaft turbofan engine
- Length: ~4.9 m (190 in) (comparable to AL-41F1)
- Diameter: ~1.28 m (50 in) (comparable to AL-41F1)
- Dry weight: 1,450 kilograms (3,200 lb)

==== Components ====
- Compressor: 3-stage low pressure, 5-stage high pressure
- Combustors: Annular
- Turbine: Single stage low pressure, single stage high pressure

==== Performance ====
- Maximum thrust:
  - 11 tf (108 kN; 24,251 lbf) dry thrust
  - 16.5 tf (162 kN; 36,376 lbf) with afterburner
- Thrust-to-weight ratio: 7.45:1 on dry thrust, 11.4:1 on afterburner.

== See also ==
- Saturn AL-41
- Saturn AL-31

Comparable engines

- Pratt & Whitney F119
- Xian WS-15

Related lists

- List of aircraft engines
