= Akhtubinsk Air Base =

Russian airbase in Astrakhan

Akhtubinsk
- Akhtubinsk, Astrakhan Oblast in Russia
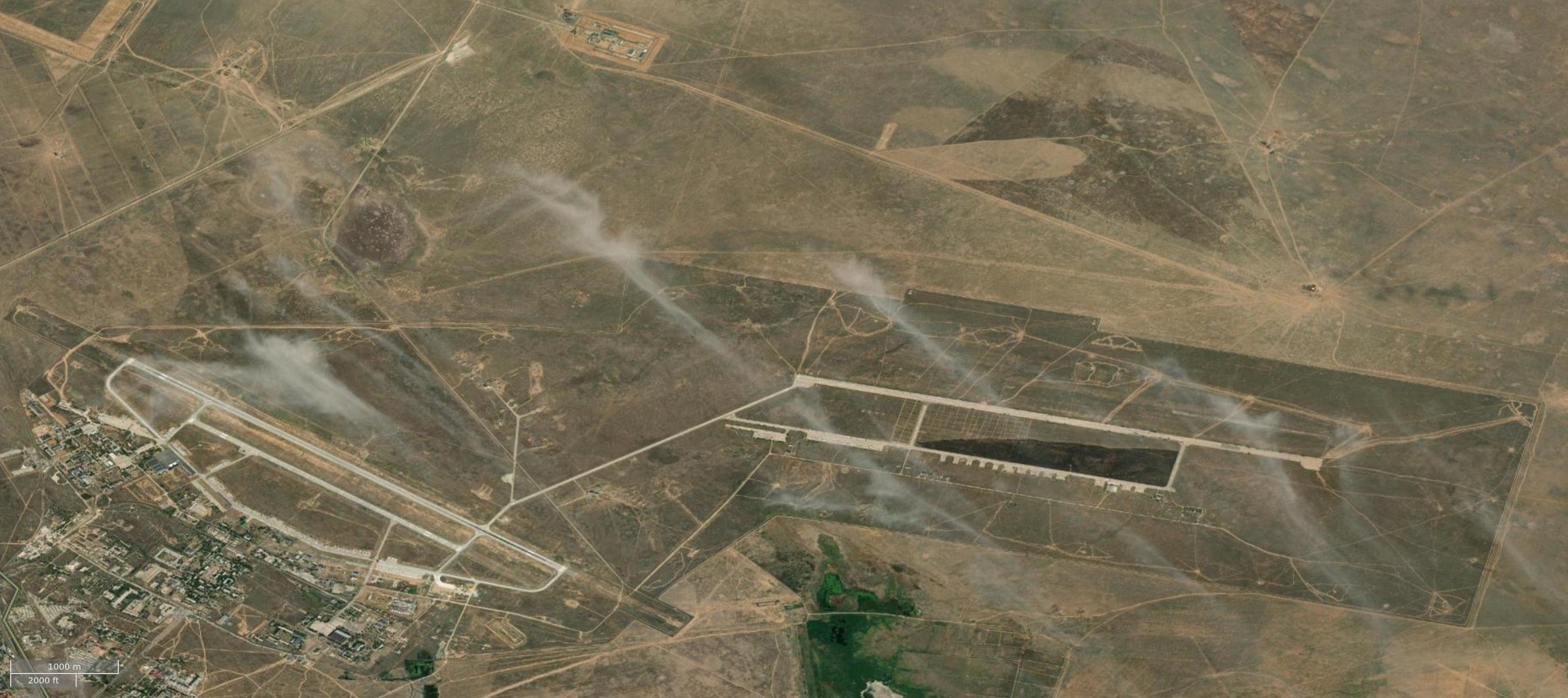
- Satellite imagery of Akhtubinsk air base

Site information
- Type: Air Base
- Owner: Ministry of Defence
- Operator: Russian Aerospace Forces

Location
- Shown within Astrakhan Oblast Akhtubinsk (Russia)
- Coordinates: 48°18′31″N 46°12′15″E

Site history
- Built: 1948
- In use: 1948 - present
- Battles/wars: 2022 Russian invasion of Ukraine

Airfield information
- Identifiers: ICAO: URWH
- Elevation: 2 metres (6 ft 7 in) AMSL
Runways
Direction	Length and surface
12L/30R	4,000 metres (13,123 ft) Concrete
12R/30L	2,500 metres (8,202 ft) Concrete

Akhtubinsk is a military base that belongs to Russian aviation research and testing military institution 929th State Flight Test Centre named for V. P. Chkalov located at Akhtubinsk, Astrakhan Oblast, Russia.

The then-State Red Banner GK Scientific Research Institute VVS was moved to the base from Chkalov in Moscow Oblast in 1960, and the 1st (fighters and fighter-bombers), 2nd (bombers), 5th (radio range), 9th (route measuring complex), and 10th (nuclear test) Scientific-Experimental Departments of the Institute were set up at Akhtubinsk that year.

In 1990 the institute received its current name.

The aerodrome was in use for testing as early as 1948; in June 1948, V. D. Lutsenko, a test pilot and Hero of the Soviet Union crashed in an aircraft of unknown type. On October 27, 1949, test pilot E.S. Greenfield died in a crash of a La-15 aircraft at Akhtubinsk during the first show of aviation equipment. On April 9, 1963 test pilot V. I. Grotsky died during a test flight of a Sukhoi Su-7B fighter-bomber aircraft near Akhtubinsk airfield.

== Aircraft ==
In 2022, Google Earth imagery showed two Sukhoi S-70 Okhotnik-B sitting on a ramp at Akhtubinsk.

Six of the advanced 5th generation Sukhoi Su-57 (ASCC: Felon) supersonic combat jets were spotted on commercial satellite pictures (and visible in Google Maps) in January 2023.

=== Russo-Ukrainian War ===
At least one decoy Su-57 was painted on the airport apron prior to 7 June 2024.

On 9 June 2024, the Ukrainian HUR claimed to have damaged two Russian Su-57 fighter jets, for the first time, using drones during a strike on the Akhtubinsk air base in Astrakhan Oblast. With casualties being reported by the HUR after the attack. Further information about the strike was added by the Russian Telegram channel Fighterbomber, which detailed that the attack was carried out by Ukrainian drones and one fighter jet was damaged by shrapnel. The same channel also added that the state of the aircraft is currently being examined which would determine whether or not it can be repaired. The ISW noted the criticism that despite the value of a single Su-57 being an estimated $35 million, it was not protected by a hangar. Maxar satellite imagery showed a crater next to an Su-57 at Akhtubinsk. 2025 satellite imagery showed hangars being built.

== See also ==
- List of military airbases in Russia
