= Sergey Bogdan =

Russian test pilot (born 1962)

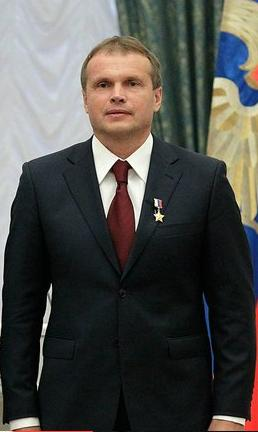
- Born: March 27, 1962; Volsk, Saratov Oblast, Russia
- Education: Borisoglebsk Higher Military Aviation School of Pilots
- Awards: Order of Courage; Hero of the Russian Federation
- Aviation career
- Air force: Russian Air Force

Sergey Leonidovich Bogdan (born March 27, 1962) is a Russian pilot. He is the chief test pilot (since 2000) for Sukhoi and Hero of Russia. He routinely performs at international air shows.

== List of Air Show Performances ==
- MAKS International Aviation and Space Salon (Russia)

Sergey Bogdan has been a regular participant at the MAKS air show, Russia’s largest aerospace exhibition. As Sukhoi’s chief test pilot, he has performed multiple flight demonstrations of Sukhoi's aircraft, including the Su-35 and later the Su-57. His displays at MAKS have been used to showcase new flight control systems and maneuverability features of Sukhoi fighter aircraft.

- Aero India (India)

During Aero India, Sergey Bogdan performed flight demonstrations of the Su-57 as part of the event’s official flying display program. His appearance attracted attention for the aircraft’s agility and thrust-vectoring maneuvers, presented to both the public and defense delegations. The demonstrations were covered extensively by Indian media during the airshow.

- China International Aviation and Aerospace Exhibition (China)

Bogdan flew the Sukhoi Su-57 during flight demonstrations at Airshow China in Zhuhai. His performances were widely recorded and discussed in aviation media, marking one of the most prominent international showcases of the aircraft in East Asia. The demonstrations emphasized low speed handling and complex aerobatic maneuvers.

- Dubai Airshow (United Arab Emirates)

At the Dubai Airshow, Sergey Bogdan has performed flight demonstrations of Sukhoi fighter aircraft, including the Su-57 and its export variant, the Su 57E. These displays focused on high angle of attack maneuvers and super-maneuverability, drawing significant attention from international media and defense analysts. His participation highlighted Russia’s fifth-generation fighter capabilities in the Middle Eastern market.

Photo montage showing the different phases of an acrobatic maneuver performed by Sergei Bogdan with a Sukhoi Su-35 during the Paris Air Show in 2013.
