= Terekta =

Terekta Теректа
- Settlement
- Location within Altai Republic Location within Russia
- Coordinates: 50°17′N 85°52′E
- Country: Russia
- Region: Altai Republic
- District: Ust-Koksinsky District
- Time zone: UTC+7:00

Terekta (Russian: Теректа; Altay: Теректӱ, Terektü) is a rural locality (a settlement) in Ust-Koksinsky District, the Altai Republic, Russia. The population was 435 as of 2016. There are 10 streets.

== Geography ==
Terekta is located 23 km east of Ust-Koksa (the district's administrative centre) by road. Chendek is the nearest rural locality.
