= Cobra maneuver =

Dynamic deceleration of fighter aircraft

Cobra maneuver / Dynamic deceleration
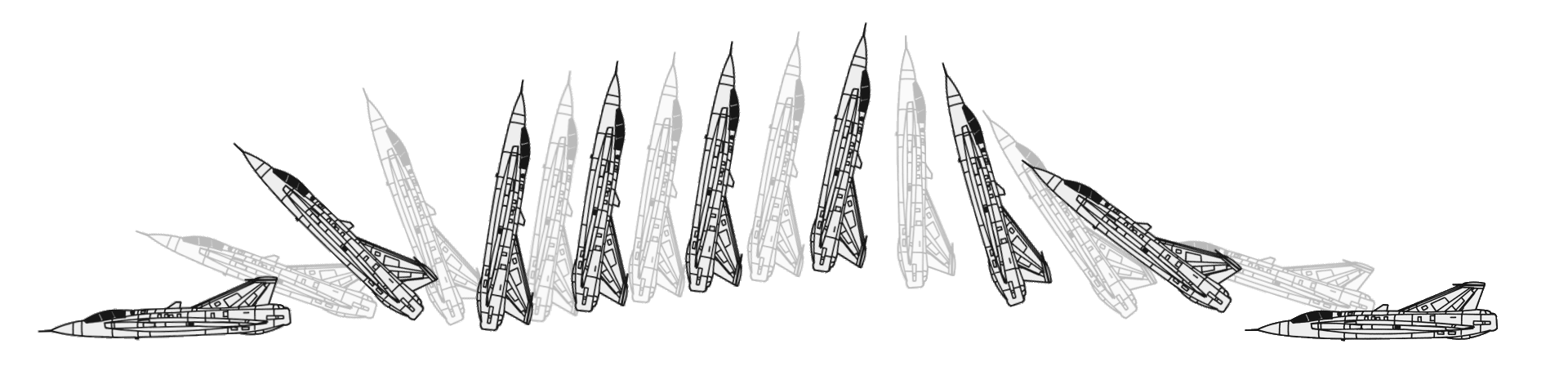
The cobra maneuver performed by a Swedish Saab 35 Draken. The footage displays the maneuver in profile next to a non-maneuvering aircraft for reference, showing how the maneuver affects the speed of the aircraft and how it can be used to make a pursuing aircraft overshoot.

In aerobatics, the cobra maneuver (or just the cobra), also called dynamic deceleration, among other names, is a dramatic and demanding maneuver in which an airplane flying at a moderate speed abruptly raises its nose momentarily to a vertical and slightly past vertical attitude, causing an extremely high angle of attack and making the plane into a full-body air brake, momentarily stalling the plane, before dropping back to normal position, during which the aircraft does not change effective altitude.

The maneuver relies on the ability of the plane to be able to quickly change angle of attack (alpha) without overloading the airframe, and sufficient engine thrust to maintain nearly constant altitude through the entire move, but also post-stall stability and aerodynamics that allows for the recovery to level flight. The maneuver demands accurate pitch control, alpha stability and engine-versus-inlet compatibility for the aircraft, as well as a high skill level on the part of the pilot.

The cobra maneuver is an example of supermaneuverability, specifically poststall maneuvering. The Herbst maneuver and the helicopter maneuver are similar post-stall maneuvers that are often executed by 4.5th generation and 5th generation fighter aircraft employing thrust vectoring.

The maneuver is typically performed at air shows, but could be used as a last-ditch maneuver to force a chaser to overshoot in close-range air combat. The maneuver has never been verified in real combat, although it has been used during mock dogfights and border protection.

== Etymology ==
The maneuver has many names, but it is most commonly known as the cobra or the cobra maneuver in the respective language; for example: Russian: Ко́бра (Kobra), German: Kobramanöver. The etymology for the name cobra is unknown but it could refer to the plane displaying its top and bottom profile, much like a cobra spreading its shield, or rearing its body up vertically to attack. A notable variant of the "cobra" name is Pugachev's cobra (alternatively the Pugachev cobra), referencing the Soviet pilot Viktor Pugachev, who was the first to bring the maneuver to the public eye.

In Sweden, the country which presumably was the first to discover the maneuver, the maneuver is traditionally known under the name kort parad ("short parry"), the Swedish term for the fencing manoeuvre "beat parry", in which an incoming attack is deflected using a beat (a sharp strike to the opponents blade, knocking it out of line), leaving the enemy open for a riposte.

As a more scientific name, the maneuver has been given the name dynamic deceleration, referring to the way the plane loses speed during the maneuver.

== Maneuver description ==
The maneuver can simply be described as; a rapid vertical pitchup from level flight without initiating a climb, followed by a forward-pitch back to level flight. If properly performed, the plane maintains nearly straight flight throughout the maneuver. The plane does not roll or yaw in either direction. This greatly lowers the speed of the aircraft due to the un-aerodynamic under-surface of the aircraft going against the airflow.

To perform the cobra, the maneuver must be entered from fairly high subsonic speeds. Proper entry speed is necessary because, if the maneuver is entered too slowly, the plane might be unable to complete the maneuver or return to level flight with sufficient speed, while entering at too high a speed would create g-forces so high that the pilot loses consciousness or the airframe is damaged. High thrust is also needed throughout the maneuver to not stall out.

To execute the maneuver the aircraft only needs to use its standard aerodynamic controls, however executing it can be achieved more easily with the addition of modern thrust vectoring.

Profile diagram of the cobra maneuver showing angle of attack (α = alpha). The aircraft in the motif depicts a MiG-29.

=== Aerodynamics ===
The cobra maneuver requires more than just pilot input and aircraft maneuverability to be performed. Since the maneuver requires the aircraft to not lose or gain substantial altitude during the maneuver, the change of alpha during the vertical pitchup has to be fast enough to break the airflow of the wings, as to not make the aircraft climb. To be able to perform this rapid vertical pitchup the aircraft needs an "aerodynamic instability" in its core aerodynamics which will make the aircraft rapidly pitch up by itself once the elevator of the aircraft is pitched to the point where it breaks the airflow during a pitch up; but also post-stall control and stability to not enter an uncontrollable stall at the peak of the pitch; which then allows the aircraft to center the elevator and using the torque from the elevators' added drag to pitch forward and make an aerodynamic recovery to horizontal flying again.

Only specific aircraft feature this "instability" and thus the maneuver can only be performed by a small number of aircraft models. This is because conventional aircraft are designed to lack this instability for safety reasons, and can thus not execute the maneuver by conventional means.

Simply put, the cobra relies more on the core aerodynamics of the aircraft than its control surfaces and avionics and can thus only be performed by specific aircraft featuring aerodynamics allowing for the maneuver.

=== Execution (Sukhoi Su-27) ===
In the case of the Su-27, to execute the maneuver the pilot initially disengages the angle of attack limiter of the plane, normally set at 26°. This action also disengages the g-limiter. After that, the pilot pulls back hard on the stick. The aircraft reaches an angle of attack of 90–120° with a slight gain of altitude and a significant loss of speed. When the elevator is centered, the drag at the rear of the plane causes a torque that makes the aircraft pitch forward. At the same time, the pilot adds power to compensate for the reduced lift.

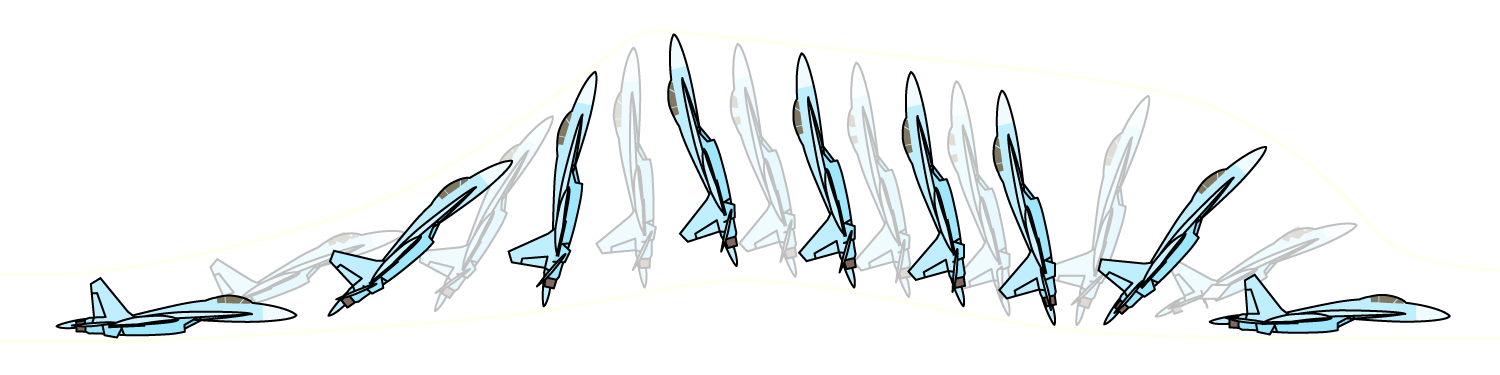
Cobra maneuver schematic of the Su-27

=== Use in combat ===
If pursued by an enemy fighter in a dogfight, by executing the cobra, a sufficiently closely pursued aircraft may suddenly slow itself down to the point that the pursuer overshoots it, allowing the previously pursued aircraft to complete the cobra behind the other. This may allow the now-pursuing aircraft an opportunity for firing its weapons, particularly if a proper pointing aspect (facing toward the former pursuer) can be maintained. Due to the speed loss when performing a cobra, maintaining weapons on target may require the use of thrust vectoring or canard control surfaces. Otherwise, the maneuver may also allow the pursued plane to flee as the overshooting attacker may lose track of the target.

The maneuver is also potentially a defense against radar, as the sudden change in velocity can often cause Doppler radar to lose its target lock. Doppler radars often ignore any objects with a near-zero velocity to reduce ground clutter. The cobra maneuver's sudden change to near-zero velocity often results in the target being momentarily filtered off as ground clutter, making it difficult for the radar to lock onto the target, or breaking the target lock if already established. There is no available documentation of this being tested beyond theory.

While the cobra maneuver may appear to be useful to force a pursuer to overshoot, the tactic would almost never be employed in any active threat scenario for a variety of reasons. The most obvious of these is the extreme loss of speed. Assuming the defending aircraft successfully forces the aggressor to overshoot the attack, the defender often does not have enough energy to counter-attack. The second more prevalent reason for avoiding the use of the maneuver is taught in most fighter pilot training. When attacking an aircraft, the pilot must be mindful of the closure-rate between both aircraft. If the closure rate is too high, the defender can change direction rapidly, which denies the attacker a shot opportunity, and thereby decreases the probability of kill. If the attacker manages their speed and rate of closure properly, the defender executing a cobra maneuver presents the attacker with a larger target to shoot due to the increased presented surface area when the defender is oriented vertically.

The cobra maneuver has been used in mock dogfights but there is little to no known documentation of it being used in actual combat. One primary described mock dogfight was fought between two planes in Swedish service. In this case, a Saab 35 Draken was pursued by a Saab 37 Viggen. The Draken suddenly performed a cobra maneuver and the Viggen overshot it. Existing material of this mock dogfight does not cover the elements of the engagement before and after the maneuver in detail, which would be useful in assessing its usefulness in modern combat. The pilots say that the maneuver was a useful combat move if performed correctly, with the caveat that it was only effective as a last ditch maneuver due to the loss of speed when performed.

== History ==
=== Sweden ===
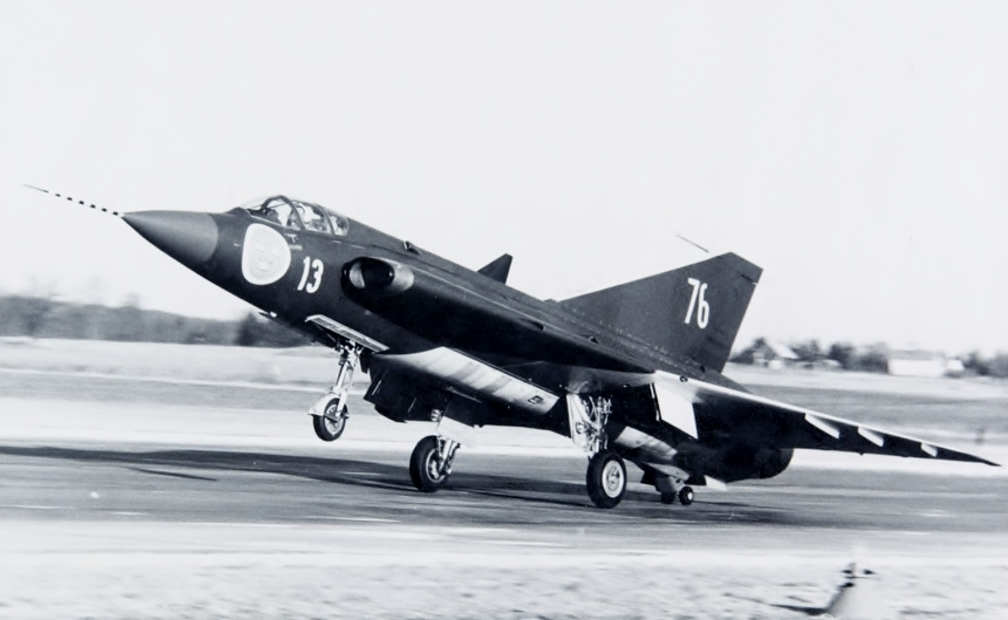
Swedish Saab 35 Draken (J 35A, a/f 35076) during camouflage tests in the early 1960s

During the early 1960s, the maneuver was developed and performed by Swedish pilots flying the Saab 35 fighter jet. It was invented during training for recovery from super stalls (also known as deep stalls) to which the double delta tailless design of the Saab 35 is especially susceptible. A super stall is an uncontrollable stall which is much harder to recover from than a standard stall. Super stall plagued the early years of Saab 35 service, causing several deaths, which led the Swedish air staff to implement extra training on how to counteract and recover from them. The result was the cobra maneuver. The Swedes named the maneuver "kort parad" (short parry) after a fencing maneuver of the same name, known as "beat parry" in English. When pulling high alpha, the pilot would have noticed that he was entering super stall, and would then have pulled negative alpha to recover. The dramatic effect of this maneuver on aircraft speed was noticed and pilots started to purposely use it to drop speed. The Swedish test pilots who discovered the cobra were Bengt Olow and Ceylon Utterborn, who developed the technique around 1961–1963.

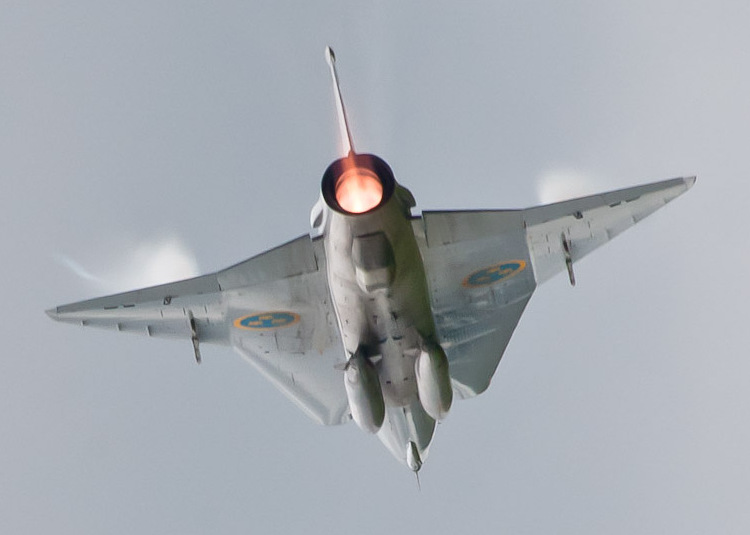
Saab 35 Draken

The Swedish pilots soon considered how to use this move in combat to get a pursuing aircraft to overshoot, putting it in a perfect position for a riposte, and it was not long until it was proven viable during mock dogfights. In real combat, depending on the situation and the execution of the maneuver, it could be used to confuse the enemy by making it lose the target or to overshoot, which would allow the pursued pilot the opportunity to either flee from combat or re-engage. However, the maneuver was very difficult and dangerous to use as anything more than a last-ditch effort, as without precise execution the aircraft's slow speed after the maneuver would make it an easy target.

The maneuver originated with the Bråvalla Wing, the first one to receive the Saab 35 fighter plane. As the fighter was adopted by other wings over time, so was the maneuver. The Scania Wing apparently called the maneuver "Wacka", which has no real meaning in Swedish.

Sweden effectively shared borders with the Soviet Union over the Baltic Sea, so both sides regularly flew into the international space between the two. In the event, the Saab 35s regularly intercepted and escorted Soviet planes away from Swedish airspace. Sometimes these encounters would result in non-combat dogfights, which were either playful or threatening in nature. Apparently, the cobra maneuver was used during some of these engagements, surprising the Soviets. Late in the Saab 35's service life, the maneuver was used as a 'secret weapon' by Saab-35 pilots in mock dogfights facing the more advanced Saab 37 fighter. The Saab 37 was unable to safely enter super stalls, and therefore its pilots did not receive any major training against its use. The cobra maneuver was therefore unknown to many Saab 37 pilots prior to facing it in competition. Due to the appeal of the tactic, some Saab 37 pilots attempted it, but to their dismay were unable to effectively perform it above speeds of 350 km/h (220 mph) as the Saab 37 couldn't safely handle the necessary gs, rendering it effectively useless in combat.

When the Saab 35 was retired, so was the maneuver, as the next generations of Swedish warplanes, the Saab 37 and the Saab 39, couldn't effectively perform it. Due to the secrecy of the Cold War era and other factors, the Swedish cobra was largely unknown to the world until some former Saab 35 and 37 pilots wrote about it years later in books and articles, long after the Soviets had been credited with its discovery.

==== Finland and Austria ====
As the Saab 35 Draken was exported by Sweden, so was the cobra maneuver. Fighter variants of the Saab 35 were exported to both the Finnish Air Force (J35 XS) and the Austrian Air Force (J35 Ö).

In an interview, former Finnish Air Force pilot Ari Saarinen recalled performing the maneuver in a Draken while intercepting a Royal Air Force Hawker Siddeley Nimrod over the Baltic Sea; the Nimrod pilot reduced power in order to get the Finns to overshoot, but the Finnish Drakens performed the maneuver to slow down, which according to Saarinen drew praise over the radio from the British Nimrod crew.

According to a video uploaded by the Scania Wing comrade association (Swedish: F10 Kamratförening), the Swedish cobra was taught to Austrian pilots training on the Saab 35 in Sweden. It is unknown whether the Austrians used this as a combat maneuver or just as training against super stall.

=== Syria ===
Beyond Sweden, Syria also discovered the maneuver prior to the Soviets.

In 1961 when Syria left the United Arab Republic, they were left with a very weak air force. The Syrians had to order new combat aircraft, and procured the MiG-21F-13 in June 1962. Once the aircraft had arrived and been integrated into the fleet, a problem became apparent. All of the unit commanders had been selected based on their political associations and loyalty to superiors, instead of knowledge of air combat. The new commanders were over-reliant on advice from about 30 Soviet advisors assigned to the Syrian Air Force to help with training on the MiGs, but were generally ineffective. In this era of power over knowledge, however, a handful of pilots with powerful connections were able to disregard their Soviet advisors and orders from their commanders.

One of these pilots, Mohammad Mansour, then a novice MiG-21-pilot fresh from a conversion course in the USSR, had an older brother, Fayez Mansour, with deep connections high in the chain of command in Damascus. Those connections enabled him to challenge Soviet advisors and demand greater operational flexibility for himself and other pilots of his unit.

During Mohammed's first clashes with the Israeli Air Force, he realized that there was a need for an effective defensive maneuver in close combat that forced a pursuer to overshoot. His initial solution based on Soviet manuals consisted of rapid descending turns followed by a sudden activation of the afterburner and a climb. However, during a test flight in early 1967, Mohammad inadvertently pitched the nose of his MiG-21 too hard, so that the forward movement of his aircraft nearly stopped. In reaction, he engaged the afterburner of his MiG, and ended with the plane standing vertically on the verge of stalling out of control. Mohammad managed to recover the plane from that state, just in time to prevent a crash. Intrigued, he decided to try to replicate the maneuver in a controlled manner, this time by engaging the afterburner beforehand, as the Tumansky R-11 engine of the MiG-21 had to spool for full effect. After successful replication of the maneuver, it became clear that this was the close combat defensive maneuver that he sought.

The Syrians named the cobra the "zero-speed maneuver" (Arabic: مناورة السرعة صفر "munawarat alsureat sifr"). Mohammad soon saw combat again with the Israeli Air Force but never got to use the maneuver. The cobra quickly became a standard part of defensive tactics for Syrian MiG-21s.

==== Pakistan and Egypt ====
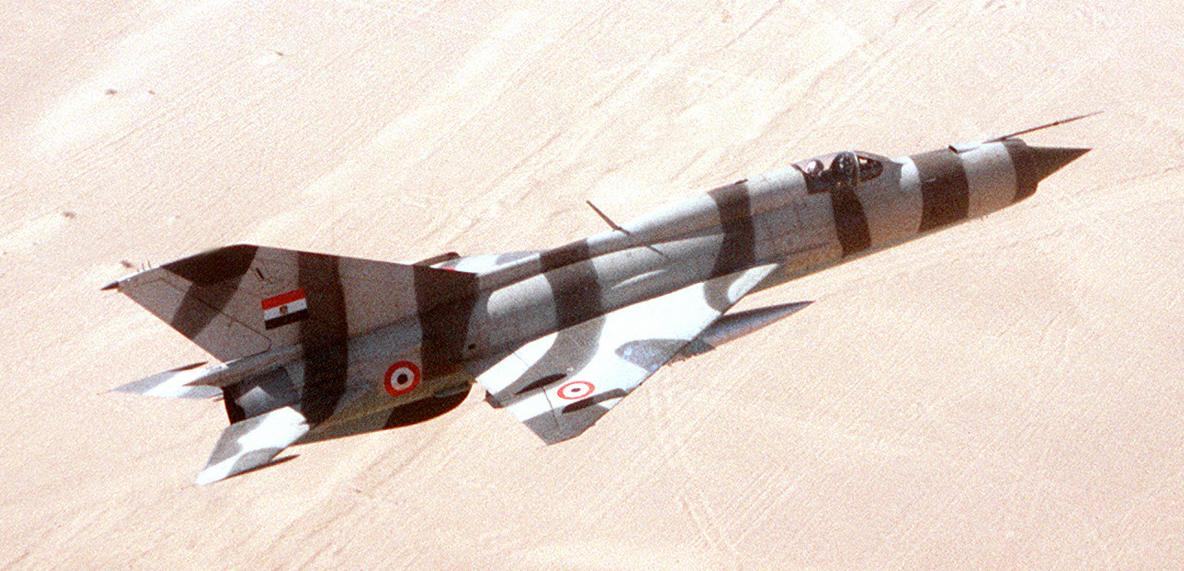
Egyptian MiG-21

With time, as their air forces were stationed in Syria, the maneuver spread to both the Pakistan and Egyptian air force, who also began using it as a standard defensive maneuver for their MiG-21s.

The cobra maneuver may have been performed in combat by an Egyptian pilot during the Yom Kippur War, but the theory is based on a quote from an Israeli pilot that only mentions an Egyptian MiG-21 apparently standing on its tail while trying to evade an attack.

=== Soviet Union ===
Research and developments on supermaneuverability started in USSR in the early 1980s by Central Aerohydrodynamic Institute, Gromov Flight Research Institute, Sukhoi and Mikoyan.

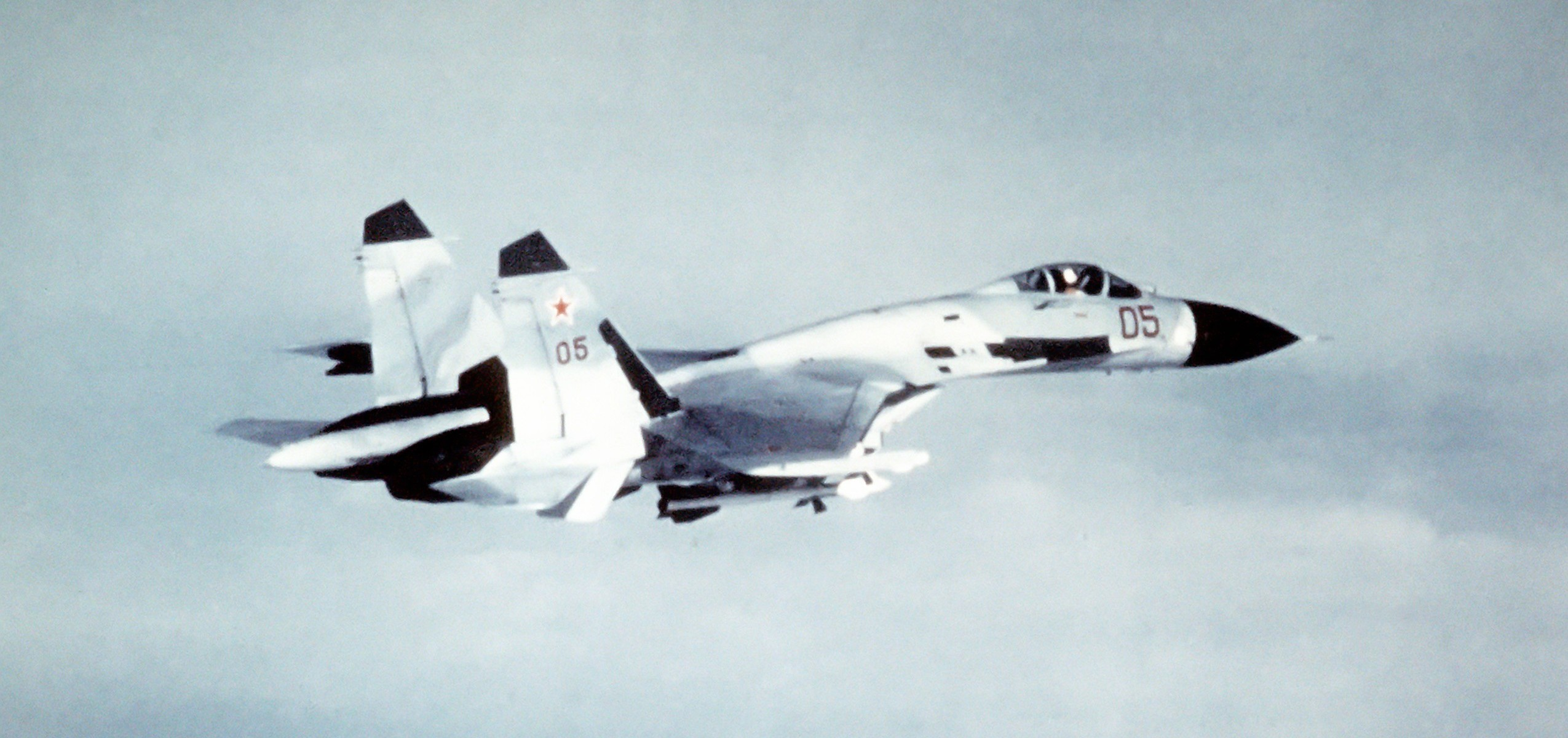
Soviet Sukhoi Su-27

In flight testing the Su-27 test pilot Igor Volk was the first to perform the maneuver in that aircraft in practice. Viktor Pugachev was the first to publicly demonstrate the maneuver in the Su-27 aerobatics display at the Le Bourget airshow of 1989. The tactic was previously unknown to the public and it was quickly named after Pugachev.

== Derivatives of the cobra ==
There are several derivatives of the cobra which all initiate similarly, but end differently.

Cobra climb

In the cobra climb, the aircraft initiates the cobra, but instead of remaining in altitude and continuing forward, it starts to stall climb (climbing vertically). The maneuver is similar to a regular stall climb except that the change from level flight to stall climb happens much faster. However, unlike a regular climb, this still achieves the effect of the cobra and the aircraft will still stall momentarily which lowers speed and momentum. The maneuver ends with the climb and the aircraft can return to common flight in various ways.

Cobra stall

In the cobra stall, the aircraft initiates the cobra, but instead of returning to level flight, the aircraft instead fully stalls out after which it applies thrust and rudder to change the direction of the aircraft.

Cobra barrel roll

A Sukhoi Su-35 piloted by Sergei Bogdan performing a Cobra barrel roll during the 2013 Paris Air Show

In the cobra roll, the aircraft initiates the cobra but instead of returning to level flight, the aircraft uses its ailerons and rudder to initiate a barrel roll at the peak of the initial nose climb which ends the maneuver with a barrel roll.

Cobra hover

The cobra hover is an extension of the original maneuver in which an aircraft initiates the cobra but remains in the "cobra state" for a longer period of time by the use of thrust control, thus achieving the "hover" part of the maneuver. After which the aircraft can complete the maneuver in various ways depending on its energy.

Cobra turn

The cobra turn is an air combat maneuver. It is a variation on the cobra maneuver where the aircraft performs the pull-up, but instead of returning to level flight applies rudder or thrust vectoring and turns downward. The aircraft achieves a negative angle of attack, ending the maneuver in a dive, therefore regaining airspeed sooner than the common cobra. John Turner of BAE considers the cobra maneuver to have little use in air combat maneuvering. It could also be argued that the combat effect is likely to be similar to the “Vectoring In Forward Flight" or VIFFing maneuver. In theory, VIFFing allows the aircraft to effectively slow down or stop while the enemy overshoots, leaving the aircraft in a favorable position to attack the enemy.

Unlike VIFFing, however, the fully developed cobra maneuver leaves the aircraft in a precarious and non-offensive attitude, with no energy, with weapons pointing toward empty sky and with the pilot having lost sight of the enemy. If the pilot exits the cobra by using rudder, this is a very slow version of the hammerhead. At the same time, the aircraft is defenseless, unable to maneuver, nearly stationary, offers the largest lateral visual and radar target and is creating a massive plume of hot exhaust, making it an easy target for any type of weapon and attack which an enemy might choose.

The transition from cobra maneuver to effective and controlled flight takes several seconds, and airspeed sufficient for defensive maneuvering is not recovered for more than ten seconds. While entering the cobra is effective as a "speed brake" maneuver, usefulness in combat is limited at best, and then only if exited while sufficient energy remains to bring the weapons to bear before the opponent can break into an evasive maneuver—or, worse, loop back and attack. One simple defense-into-attack maneuver is for the opponent to split-S, pass under the cobra aircraft, then half-loop again to bring the cobra aircraft into the cone of fire. The primary danger for the opponent becomes the possibility of a mid-air collision with the slowly moving target.

The cobra turn first gained widespread attention after it was performed by the Sukhoi Su-27, Su-35 and Su-37 at various European airshows.

== List of cobra capable aircraft ==
Cobra capable aircraft (alphabetical order)
Name/Designation	Type	Year of introduction	Country of origin	Sources
Chengdu J-10B TVC	Demonstrator	2018	China	
General Dynamics F-16 VISTA	Demonstrator	1992	US	
Mikoyan-Gurevich MiG-21F-13	Fighter	1960	Soviet Union	
Mikoyan MiG-29A	Fighter	1983	Soviet Union	
Mikoyan MiG-29M OVT	Demonstrator	2001	Russia	
Saab 35A	Fighter	1960	Sweden	
Saab 35B	Fighter	1962	Sweden	
Saab 35C	Trainer	1962	Sweden	
Saab 35D, 35Ö	Fighter	1963	Sweden	
Saab 35F, 35J, 35S	Fighter	1965	Sweden	
Sukhoi Su-27	Fighter	1985	Soviet Union	
Sukhoi Su-35	Fighter	2014	Russia	

== See also ==
- Herbst maneuver, post-stall braking and turn demonstrated by the Rockwell-MBB X-31 experimental thrust vectoring fighter.
- Kulbit, a more demanding combat maneuver (performed for example by the Sukhoi Su-37)
