= Herbst maneuver =

Air combat maneuver

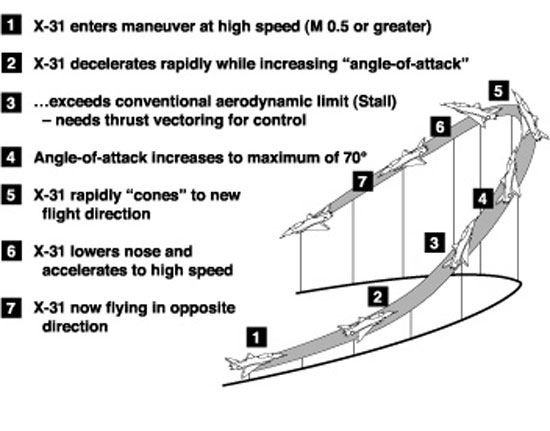
A diagram of the Herbst maneuver. (NASA)

The Herbst maneuver (also known as a J-turn) is an air combat maneuver that uses post-stall technology such as thrust vectoring and advanced flight controls to achieve high angles of attack. The Herbst maneuver allows an aircraft to quickly reverse direction using a combination of high angle-of-attack and rolling. Though categorized with Pugachev's Cobra, which is popular at airshows, the Herbst maneuver is considered more useful in combat.

The Herbst maneuver was named after Wolfgang Herbst, an employee of Messerschmitt-Bölkow-Blohm (MBB). Herbst was the initiator of the Rockwell SNAKE, which formed the basis for the Rockwell-MBB X-31 project, and one of the original developers of post-stall technology. The Herbst maneuver was first performed by an X-31 on April 29, 1993.

== See also ==
- Supermaneuverability
- Immelmann turn
