= X31 =

X31 may refer to:

- X31 (New York City bus)
- Rockwell-MBB X-31, an experimental aircraft
- ThinkPad X31, a notebook computer
