= Supermaneuverability =

Fighter aircraft tactical maneuvers not possible using only aerodynamic techniques

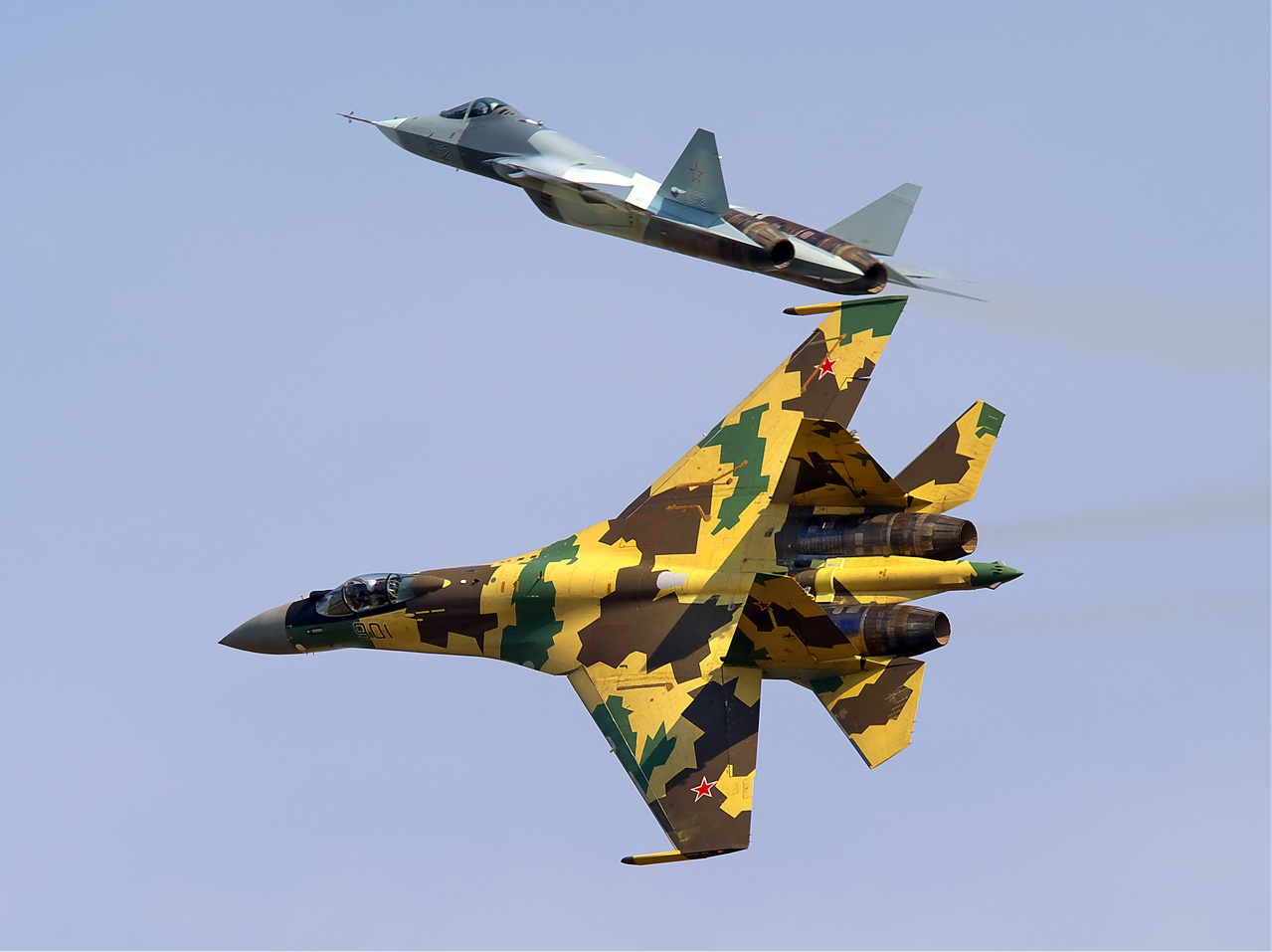
The Sukhoi Su-35 and Sukhoi Su-57 are modern jetfighters with supermaneuverability.

Supermaneuverability is the capability of fighter aircraft to execute tactical maneuvers that are not possible with purely aerodynamic techniques. Such maneuvers can involve controlled side-slipping or angles of attack beyond maximum lift.

This capability was researched beginning in 1975 at the Langley Research Center in the United States, and eventually resulted in the development of the McDonnell Douglas F-15 STOL/MTD as a proof of concept aircraft. The Saab 35 Draken was another early aircraft with limited supermaneuverable capabilities.

In 1983, the MiG-29 and in 1986, the Sukhoi Su-27 were deployed with this capability, which has since become standard in all of Russia's fourth- and fifth-generation aircraft. There has been some speculation, but the mechanism behind the supermaneuverability of the Russian-built aircraft has not been publicly disclosed. However, post-stall analyses have been increasingly used in recent years to advance maneuverability via the use of thrust vectoring engine nozzles.

The USAF abandoned the concept as counter-productive to BVR engagements as the Cobra maneuver leaves the aircraft in a state of near-zero energy, having bled off most of its speed without gaining any compensating altitude in the process. Except in one-on-one engagements, this leaves the aircraft very vulnerable to both missile and gun attack by a wingman or other hostile, even if the initial threat overshoots the supermaneuvered aircraft.

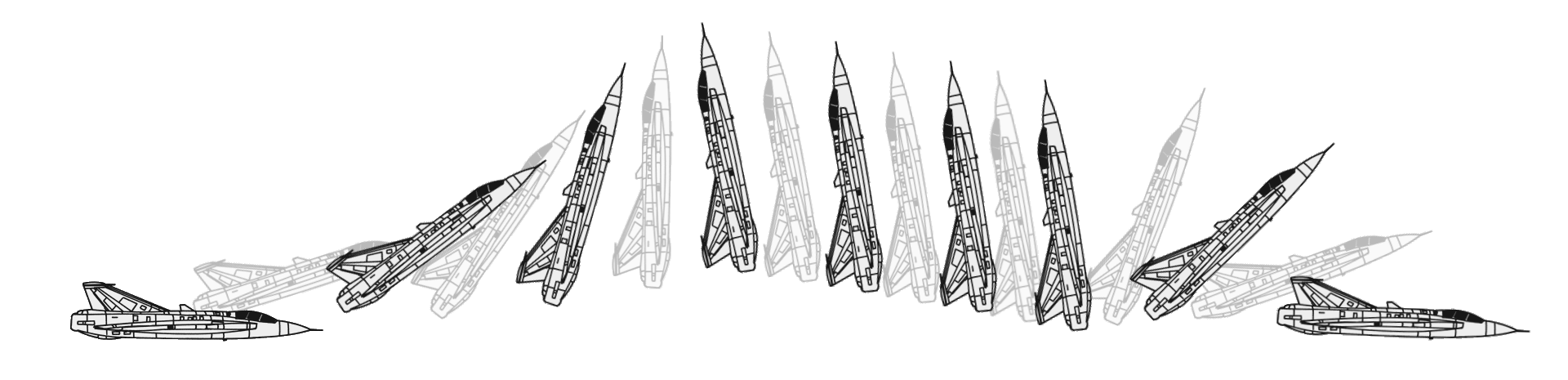
Pugachev's Cobra maneuver is one of the tests for supermaneuverability, performed here by a Saab 35 Draken.

== Aerodynamic maneuverability vs supermaneuverability ==
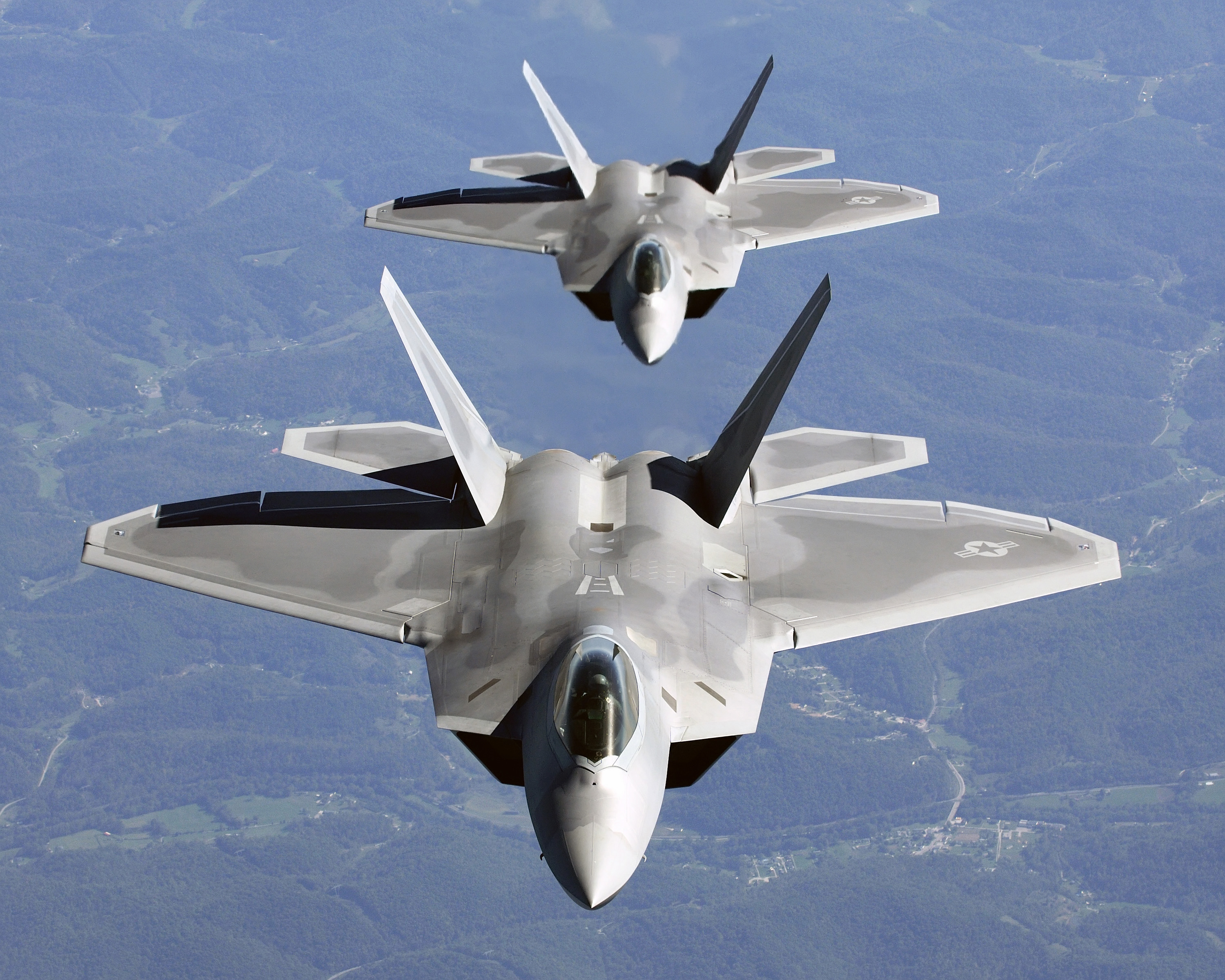
F-22 Raptor, the first U.S. operational supermaneuverable fighter aircraft. It has thrust vectoring and a thrust-to-weight ratio of 1.26 at 50% fuel.

Traditional aircraft maneuvering is accomplished by altering the flow of air passing over the control surfaces of the aircraft—the ailerons, elevators, flaps, air brakes and rudder. Some of these control surfaces can be combined—such as in the "ruddervators" of a V-tail configuration—but the basic properties are unaffected. When a control surface is moved to present an angle to the oncoming airflow, it alters the airflow around the surface, changing its pressure distribution, and thus applying a pitching, rolling, or yawing moment to the aircraft.

The angle of control surface deflection and resulting directional force on the aircraft are controlled both by the pilot and the aircraft's inbuilt control systems to maintain the desired attitude, such as pitch, roll and heading, and also to perform aerobatic maneuvers that rapidly change the aircraft's attitude. For traditional maneuvering control to be maintained, the aircraft must maintain sufficient forward velocity and a sufficiently low angle of attack to provide airflow over the wings (maintaining lift) and also over its control surfaces.

As airflow decreases so does effectiveness of the control surfaces and thus the maneuverability. If the angle of attack exceeds its critical value, the airplane will stall. Pilots are trained to avoid stalls during aerobatic maneuvering and especially in combat, as a stall can permit an opponent to gain an advantageous position while the stalled aircraft's pilot attempts to recover.

The speed at which an aircraft is capable of its maximum aerodynamic maneuverability is known as the corner airspeed; at any greater speed the control surfaces cannot operate at maximum effect due to either airframe stresses or induced instability from turbulent airflow over the control surface. At lower speeds the redirection of air over control surfaces, and thus the force applied to maneuver the aircraft, is reduced below the airframe's maximum capacity and thus the aircraft will not turn at its maximum rate. It is therefore desirable in aerobatic maneuvering to maintain corner velocity.

In a supermaneuverable aircraft, the pilot can maintain a high degree of maneuverability below corner velocity, and at least limited altitude control without altitude loss below stall speed. Such an aircraft is capable of maneuvers that are impossible with a purely aerodynamic design. More recently, increased use of jet-powered, instrumented unmanned vehicles ("research drones") has increased the potential flyable angle of attack beyond 90 degrees and well into the post-stall safe flight domains, and has also replaced some of the traditional uses of wind tunnels.

== Evidence ==
There is no strict set of guidelines an aircraft must meet or features it must have in order to be classified as supermaneuverable. However, as supermaneuverability itself is defined, the ability of an aircraft to perform high alpha maneuvers that are impossible for most aircraft is evidence of the aircraft's supermaneuverability. Such maneuvers include Pugachev's Cobra and the Herbst maneuver (also known as the "J-turn").

Some aircraft are capable of performing Pugachev's Cobra without the aid of features that normally provide post-stall maneuvering such as thrust vectoring. Advanced fourth generation fighters such as the Su-27, MiG-29 along with their variants have been documented as capable of performing this maneuver using normal, non-thrust vectoring engines. The ability of these aircraft to perform this maneuver is based in inherent instability like that of the F-16; the MiG-29 and Su-27 families of jets are designed for desirable post-stall behavior. Thus, when performing a maneuver like Pugachev's Cobra the aircraft will stall as the nose pitches up and the airflow over the wing becomes separated, but naturally nose down even from a partially inverted position, allowing the pilot to recover complete control.

The Cobra, as performed by non-thrust vectoring aircraft, still depends on the aircraft moving through air; however, it does not involve the aircraft's aerodynamic surfaces and normal laminar airflow, but rather the whole airframe as a solid shape traveling through air, and its center of gravity in relation to the thrust vector. Being performed under conditions far beyond normal aerodynamic control and well into a stall without thrust vectoring, this is a form of passive supermaneuverability, possible because of aircraft design rather than thrust vectoring, which provides a way to actively control the aircraft well outside of the normal flight envelope.

The Herbst Maneuver, however, is believed to be impossible without thrust vectoring as the "J-turn" requires a half-roll in addition to pitching while the aircraft is stalled, which is impossible using conventional control surfaces. Pugachev's Cobra can be performed with less change in altitude if vectored thrust is used, as the aircraft can be made to pitch far more rapidly, both inducing the stall before the aircraft significantly gains altitude and recovering level attitude before altitude is lost.

== Characteristics ==
Although as aforementioned no fixed set of features defines a supermaneuverable aircraft explicitly, virtually all aircraft considered supermaneuverable have a majority of common characteristics that aid in maneuverability and stall control.

The classical air combat starts at high speed, but if you miss on the first shot—and the probability is there because there are maneuvers to avoid missiles—the combat will be more prolonged. After maneuvering, the aircraft will be at a lower speed, but both aircraft may be in a position where they cannot shoot. But supermaneuverability allows an aircraft to turn within three seconds and take another shot.

— Sergey Bogdan, Sukhoi chief test pilot

=== Post-stall characteristics ===
The key difference between a pure aerodynamic fighter and a supermaneuverable one is generally found in its post-stall characteristics. A stall, as aforementioned, happens when the flow of air over the top of the wing becomes separated due to a high angle of attack (this can be caused by low speed, but its direct cause is based on the direction of the airflow contacting the wing); the airfoil then loses its main source of lift and will not support the aircraft until normal airflow is restored over the top of the wing.

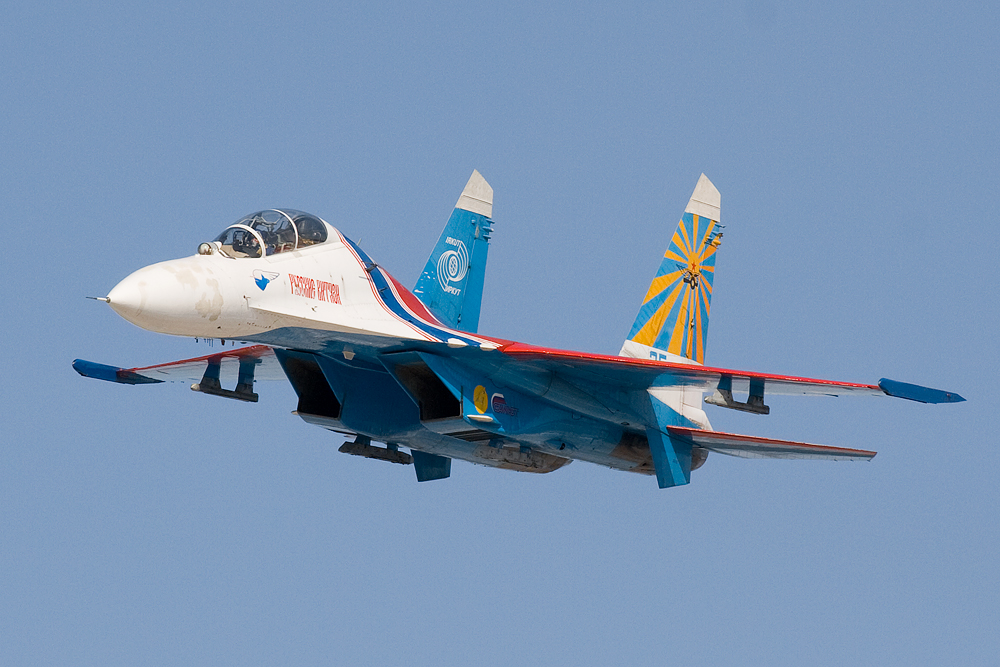
A Su-27 from the Russian Knights aerobatic team, a supermaneuverable 4th-generation jet. This jet can easily perform Pugachev's Cobra.

The behavior of the aircraft in a stall is where the main difference can be observed between aerodynamic maneuverability and supermaneuverability. In a stall, traditional control surfaces, especially the ailerons, have little or no ability to change the aircraft's attitude. Most aircraft are designed to be stable and easily recoverable in such a situation; the aircraft will pitch nose-down so that the angle of attack of the wings is reduced to match the aircraft's current direction (known technically as the velocity vector), restoring normal airflow over the wings and control surfaces and enabling controlled flight.

However, some aircraft will deep stall. The aircraft's design will inhibit or prevent a reduction in angle of attack to restore airflow. The F-16 has this flaw, due in part to its fly-by-wire controls, which under certain circumstances limit the ability of the pilot to point the nose of the aircraft downward to reduce angle of attack and recover. Neither an extreme pitch-down nor a deep stall is desirable in a supermaneuverable aircraft.

A supermaneuverable aircraft allows the pilot to maintain at least some control when the aircraft stalls, and to regain full control quickly. This is achieved largely by designing an aircraft that is highly maneuverable, but will not deep stall (thus allowing quick recovery by the pilot) and will recover predictably and favorably (ideally to level flight; more realistically to as shallow a nose-down attitude as possible). To that design, features are then added that allow the pilot to actively control the aircraft while in the stall, and retain or regain forward level flight in an extremely shallow band of altitude that surpasses the capabilities of pure aerodynamic maneuvering.

=== Thrust-to-weight ratio ===
A key feature of supermaneuvering fighters is a high thrust-to-weight ratio; that is, the comparison of the force produced by the engines to the aircraft's weight, which is the force of gravity on the aircraft. It is generally desirable in any aerobatic aircraft, as a high-thrust-to-weight ratio allows the aircraft to recover velocity quickly after a high-G maneuver. In particular, a thrust-to-weight ratio greater than 1:1 is a critical threshold, as it allows the aircraft to maintain and even gain velocity in a nose-up attitude; such a climb is based on sheer engine power, without any lift provided by the wings to counter gravity, and has become crucial to aerobatic maneuvers in the vertical (which are in turn essential to air combat).

High thrust-to-weight is essential to supermaneuvering fighters because it not only avoids many situations in which an aircraft can stall (such as during vertical climbing maneuvers), but when the aircraft does stall, the high thrust-to-weight ratio allows the pilot to sharply increase forward speed even as the aircraft pitches nose-down; this reduces the angle the nose must pitch down in order to meet the velocity vector, thus recovering more quickly from the stall. This allows stalls to be controlled; the pilot will intentionally stall the aircraft with a hard maneuver, then recover quickly with the high engine power.

Beginning in the late fourth generation and through Generation 4.5 of aircraft development, advances in engine efficiency and power enabled many fighters to approach and exceed thrust-to-weight ratios of 1:1. Most current and planned fifth-generation fighters will exceed this threshold.

=== High aerodynamic maneuverability ===
Even though true supermaneuverability lies outside the realm of what is possible with pure aerodynamic control, the technologies that push aircraft into supermaneuvering capability are based on what is otherwise a conventional aerodynamically controlled design. Thus, a design that is highly maneuverable by traditional aerodynamics is a necessary base for a supermaneuverable fighter.

Features such as large control surfaces which provide more force with less angular change from neutral which minimizes separation of airflow, lifting body design including the use of strakes, which allow the fuselage of the aircraft to create lift in addition to that of its wings, and low-drag design, particularly reducing drag at the leading edges of the aircraft such as its nose cone, wings and engine intake ducts, are all essential to creating a highly maneuverable aircraft.

Some designs, like the F-16 (which in current production form is regarded as highly maneuverable, but only the F-16 VISTA tech demonstrator is considered supermaneuverable) are designed to be inherently unstable; that is, the aircraft, if completely uncontrolled, will not tend to return to level, stable flight after a disturbance as an inherently stable design will. Such designs require the use of a "fly-by-wire" system where a computer corrects for minor instabilities while also interpreting the pilot's input and manipulating the control surfaces to produce the desired behavior without inducing a loss of control. Thus corrected for, the instability of the design creates an aircraft that is highly maneuverable; free from the self-limiting resistance that a stable design provides to desired maneuvers, an intentionally unstable design is capable of far higher rates of turn than would otherwise be possible.

=== Canard controls ===
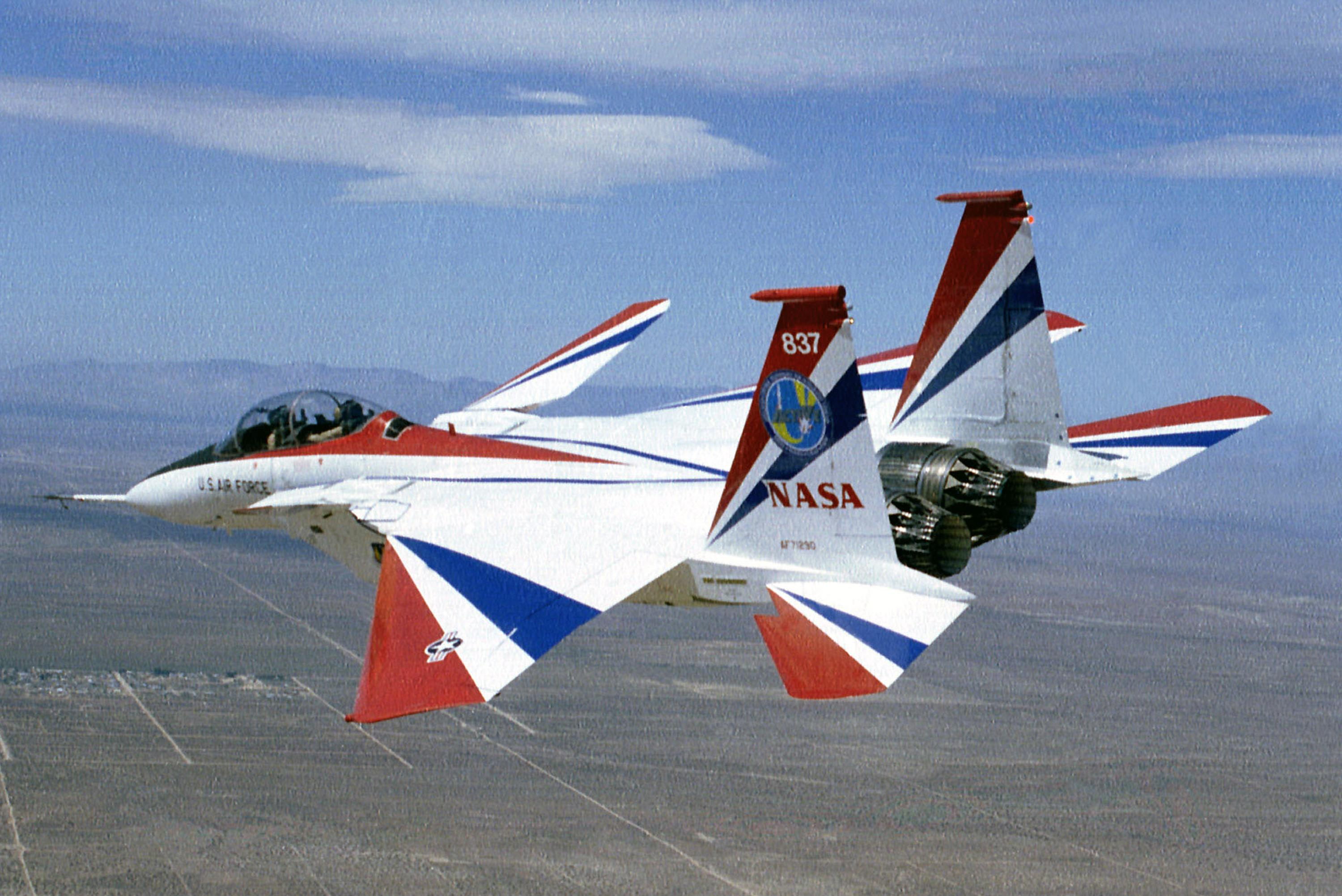
The F-15 ACTIVE in flight; the design is a modified F-15 Eagle with vectored thrust and canards.

A canard is an elevator control surface placed forward of the wings. Sometimes, as with the B-1B, they are simply used to stabilize flexible portions of the fuselage or provide very minute attitude changes, but they are used often as a supplement to or full replacement of tail-mounted stabilators.

The theory behind canards as the sole elevator surface is that no elevator configuration aft of the wings is truly satisfactory for maneuvering purposes; the airflow over the wings creates turbulence, however small, and thus affects elevators placed directly behind the wings. Placement below the wings (common on many fighters) exposes the elevators to even greater turbulence from under-wing ordnance.

The original solution to such problems, the T-tail, has been largely discredited as being prone to dangerous "deep stalls". Other solutions like the V-tail place the combination rudder-elevator surfaces out of the wings' airflow, but reduce the effectiveness of the control surface in the pure pitch and yaw axes.

As a supplement to traditional elevators, canards vastly increase control surface area, and often increase the critical angle of attack of the wings as the canard directs air more directly toward the leading edge of the wing. They can also be designed to operate independently (i.e., counter-rotate), thus also acting as ailerons.

Canards are not a requirement, and can have disadvantages including reduced pilot visibility, increased mechanical complexity and fragility, and increased radar signature, although radar cross-section can be reduced by controlling canard deflection through flight control software, as is done on the Eurofighter. F-22, for example, does not incorporate canards, mostly for stealth reasons. The only stealth fighter that incorporates canards is the J-20.

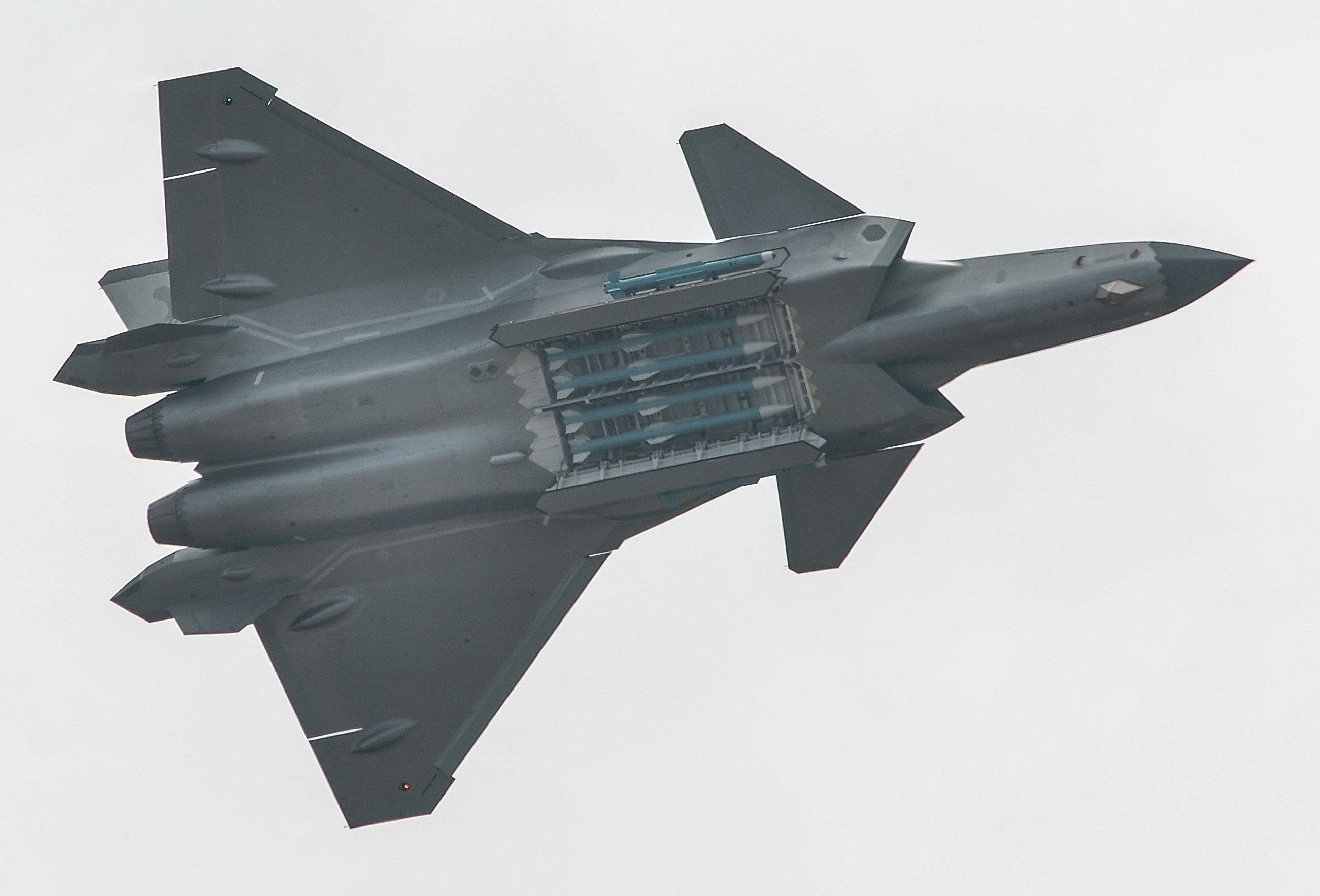
A J-20 fighter opening its weapons bay

The production Su-35 also omits canards. Many technology demonstrators and maneuverability testbeds such as the F-15 S/MTD incorporated canards, even when the production aircraft they were based on did not. Production fighters like the Eurofighter Typhoon, Dassault Rafale and Saab Gripen all use a delta-wing configuration with canard surfaces, while some variants of the Su-27 including the Su-30, Su-30MKI, Su-33 and Su-37 use canards to supplement traditional tail-mounted elevators.

=== Thrust vectoring ===
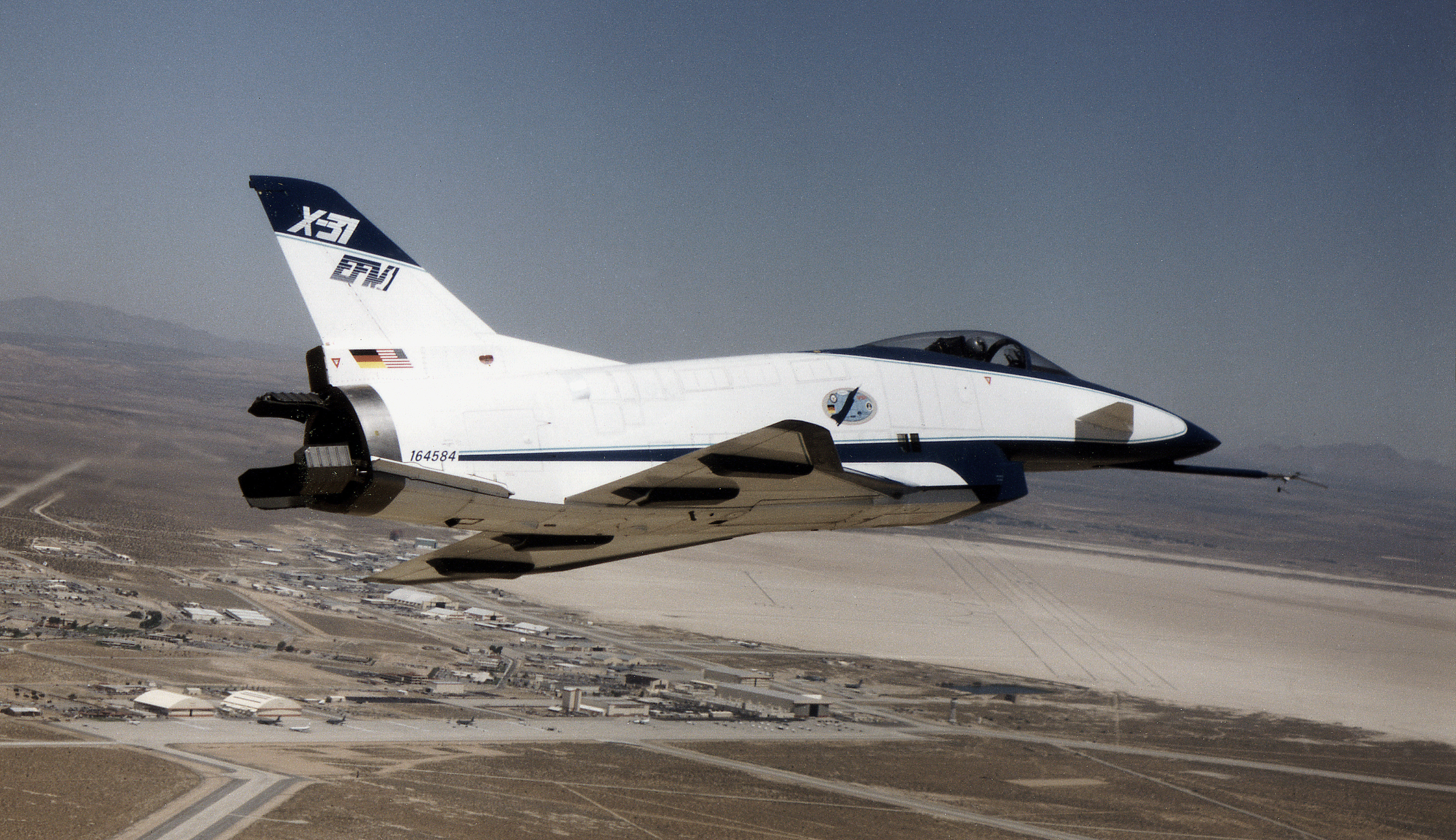
The Rockwell-MBB X-31, an experimental supermaneuverable aircraft incorporating thrust vectoring

Though a high thrust-to-weight ratio and high aerodynamic maneuverability are found on both aerodynamic and supermaneuvering aircraft, the technology most directly linked to supermaneuverability is thrust vectoring, in which the geometry of the exhaust nozzle of a traditional jet engine can be modified to angle the engine's thrust in a direction other than directly to the rear (i.e., upwards or downwards).

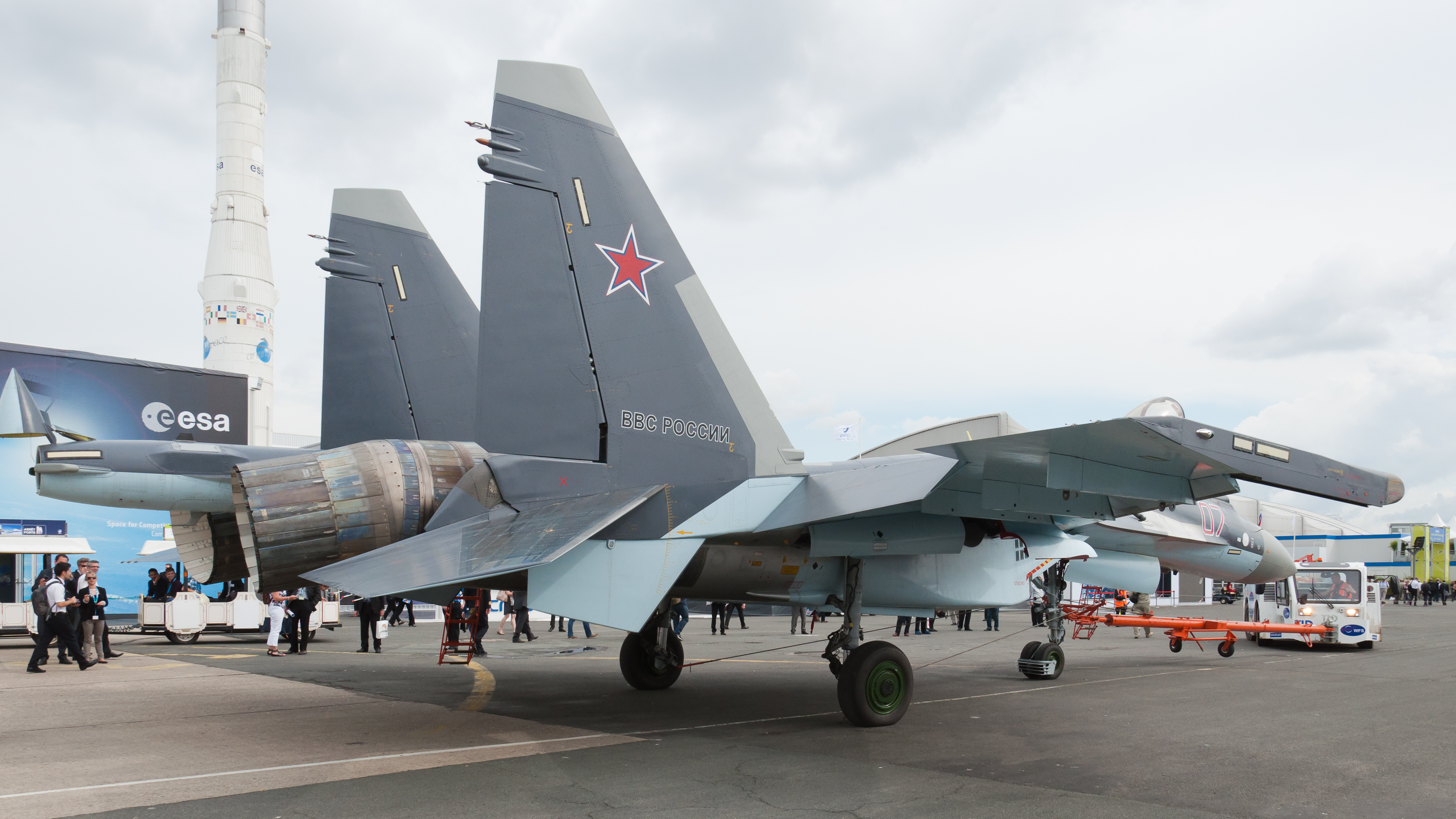
Modern Sukhoi jetfighter series including the Su-30, Su-35S and Su-57 are examples of in-service jetfighters utilizing thrust-vectoring technologies for supermaneuverability.

This applies force to the rear of the aircraft in the opposite direction similar to a conventional control surface, but unlike a control surface the force from the vectored thrust is dependent on current engine thrust, not airspeed. Thus thrust vectoring not only augments control surfaces (generally that of the elevators) at speed, but allows the aircraft to retain maximum maneuverability below corner speed and some attitude control below stall speed while in maneuvers.

Technology demonstrators such as the X-31, F-16 VISTA and F-15 S/MTD were built to showcase the capabilities of an aircraft using this technology; it has since been incorporated into pre-production and production fighters such as the F-22 Raptor. Eastern Bloc design companies have also introduced this technology into variants of fourth-generation aircraft such as the MiG-29 and Su-27 to produce the MiG-29OVT tech demonstrator and Su-30MKI air superiority fighter respectively, and planned fifth-generation Russian-designed aircraft such as the Sukhoi Su-57 will use the technology as well. In addition domestic Russian Su-30 fighters will be upgraded with thrust vectoring engines.

Thrust vectoring is most useful while performing maneuvers such as the aerial J-turn, where the nose of the aircraft is pointed upwards (and thus the engine thrust counters gravity as well as providing attitude control). It is generally considered impossible, in fact, to perform a true J-turn maneuver without vectored thrust. Other maneuvers that are considered impossible to perform under control using only aerodynamic maneuvering include the Bell (a 360° loop with negligible altitude change) and the controlled flat spin (360° of yaw around a point of rotation that lies inside the aircraft).

== See also ==
- Index of aviation articles
