= Viktor Pugachev =

Soviet test pilot

- Ви́ктор Гео́ргиевич Пугачёв
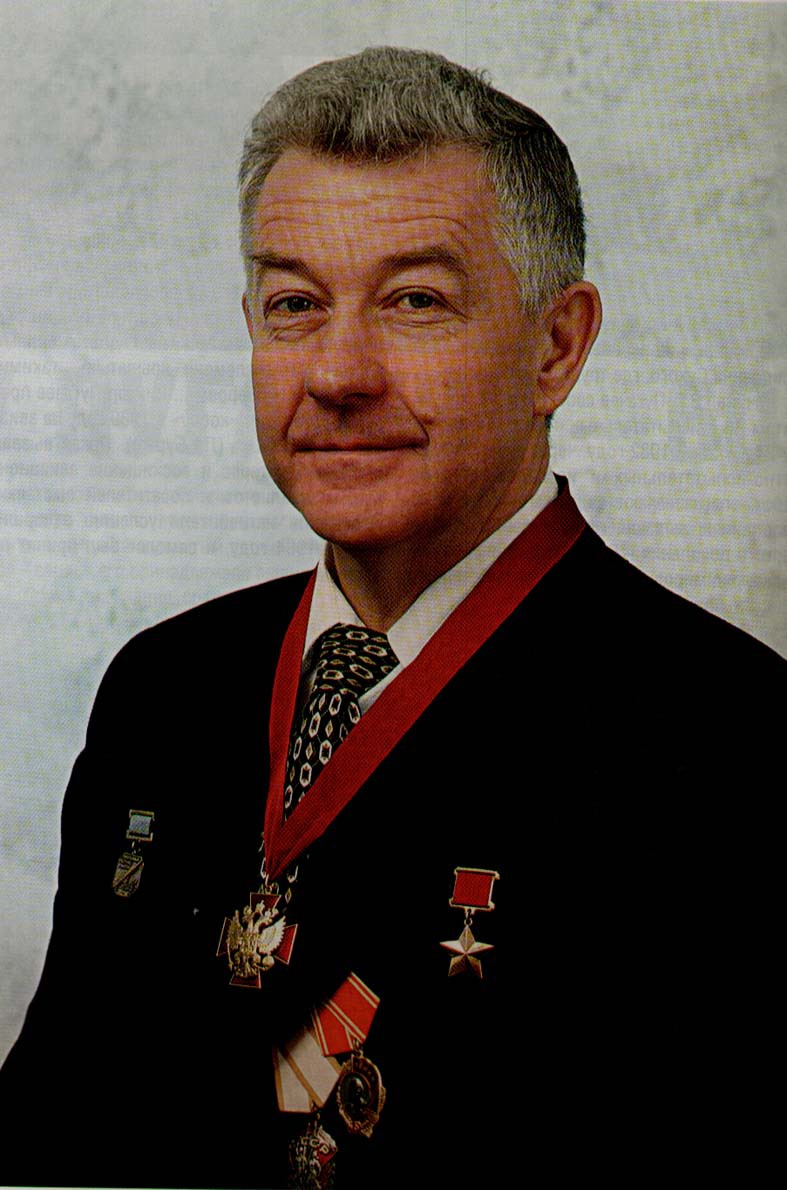
- Born: 8 August 1948; Taganrog, Rostov Oblast, Russian SSR, USSR
- Education: Moscow Aviation Institute (1980), Gromov Flight Research Institute
- Occupations: Soviet Air Force pilot; test pilot; Chief Pilot Designer
- Years active: 1970-present
- Employer: Sukhoi Sukhoi Design Bureau
- Known for: test pilot, Pugachev's Cobra maneuver

Signature
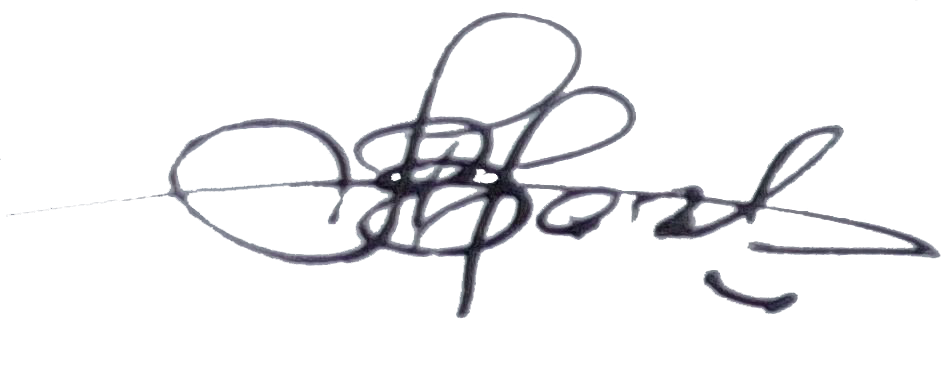

Flight career
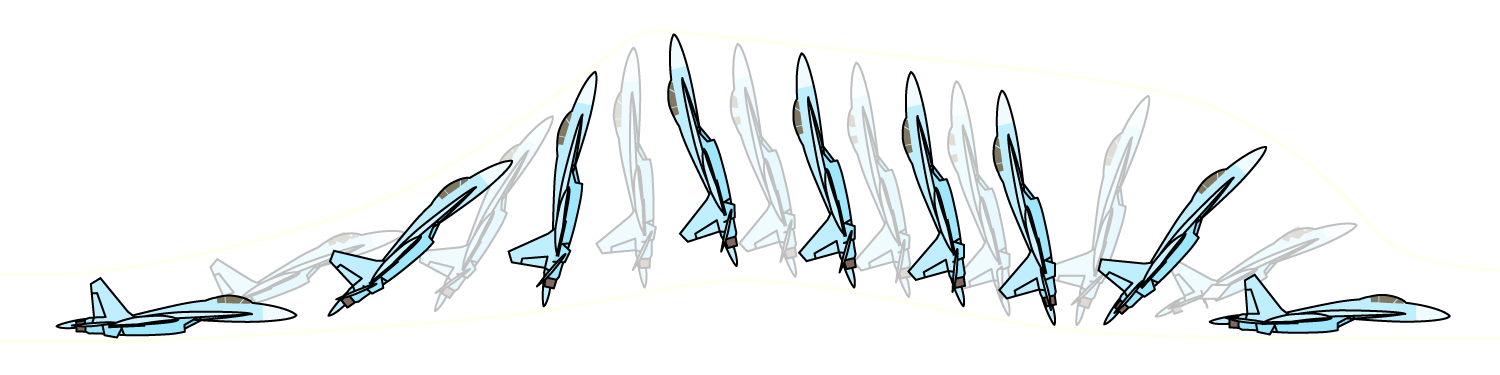
- first public Pugachev's Cobra flight-tested was done by Viktor Pugachev in 1989 in Paris Airshow
- Education: Private Pilot - Yeysk Military Institute (1970); Moscow Aviation Institute (1978); Test pilot - Gromov Flight Research Institute
- Awards: Order "For Merit to the Fatherland"; Hero of the Soviet Union; Honoured Test Pilot of the USSR; Hero of the Soviet Union; Order of Lenin; Honoured Test Pilot of the USSR; Order of the Badge of Honour
- Aviation career
- First flight: 1970
- Famous flights: first test pilot to demonstrate the so-called Pugachev's Cobra manoeuvre to the general public in 1989, flying an Su-27; Sukhoi Su-27 fighter test programme including first ever non-vertical take-off and landing (VTOL) from the aircraft carrier Admiral Kuznetsov
- Flight license: 1970; Yeysk Military Institute
- Air force: Soviet
- Battles: none

Viktor Georgiyevich Pugachev (Russian: Ви́ктор Гео́ргиевич Пугачёв) (born 8 August 1948 in Taganrog, RSFSR) is a retired Russian Air Force officer and a former Soviet test pilot who was the first to demonstrate the so-called Pugachev's Cobra manoeuvre to the general public in 1989, flying an Su-27. The Gold medal of the Hero of the Soviet Union was awarded to him in the late 1980s. He graduated from the Yeysk Higher Military Order of Lenin Aviation School in 1970, test-pilot school in 1978 and the Moscow Aviation Institute in 1980. After two years with Gromov Flight Research Institute he joined OKB Sukhoi where he tested the Su-9, Su-15, Su-24, Su-25 and the Su-27. On 1 November 1989 he landed a Su-27K on an aircraft carrier for the first time in Soviet history. He became famous after his 1989 Su-27 demonstrations on the Paris Airshow. Pugachev is credited with first ever vertical take-off and landing (VTOL) from the aircraft carrier Admiral Kuznetsov.

He currently lives in Zhukovsky and works as the Chief Pilot Designer at Sukhoi Design Bureau.

== Record flights ==
While working as a test pilot at Sukhoi he broke 13 world records in the Sukhoi P-42:

Source: Fédération Aéronautique Internationale
Date	Class (and group)	Description	Record	Status
1986-11-15	C-1 (3)	Time to climb to 3,000 m	25.37 s	Record
1986-11-15	C-1h (3)	Time to climb to 3,000 m	25.37 s	Record
1986-11-15	C-1 (3)	Time to climb to 6,000 m	37.05 s	Record
1986-11-15	C-1h (3)	Time to climb to 6,000 m	37.05 s	Record
1986-11-15	C-1 (3)	Time to climb to 9,000 m	47.03 s	Improved to 44.18 s by same aircraft
1986-11-15	C-1h (3)	Time to climb to 9,000 m	47.03 s	Improved to 44.18 s by same aircraft
1986-11-15	C-1 (3)	Time to climb to 12,000 m	58.10 s	Improved to 55.54 s by same aircraft
1986-11-15	C-1h (3)	Time to climb to 12,000 m	58.10 s	Improved to 55.54 s by same aircraft
1990-03-29	C-1h (3)	Time to climb to 15,000 m with 1,000 kg payload	1 m 21.71 s	Record
1993-05-20	C-1i (3)	Time to climb to 15,000 m	2 m 6 s	Record
1993-05-20	C-1i (3)	Time to climb to 15,000 m with 1,000 kg payload	2 m 6 s	Record
1993-05-20	C-1i (3)	Maximum payload to 15,000 m	1,015 kg	Record
1993-05-20	C-1i (3)	Maximum altitude with 1,000 kg payload	22,250 m	Record

== Honours and awards ==
- Hero of the Soviet Union (1989) – for courage and heroism in the development of the Su-27
- Order of Merit for the Fatherland, 3rd class (1999) – for services to the state, a large contribution to the development, creation of modern aviation technology and years of diligent work
- Order of Lenin (1989)
- Order of the Badge of Honour (1983)
- Order for Personal Courage
- Honoured Test Pilot of the USSR (1991)
- Order of Ivan Kalita (Moscow Region (2008)
- Prize Laureate. Vladimir Vysotsky's "Own Track"
- Jubilee Medal "300 Years of the Russian Navy"
- Medal "In Commemoration of the 850th Anniversary of Moscow"
