= Jubilee Medal "300 Years of the Russian Navy" =

Commemorative medal of Russia

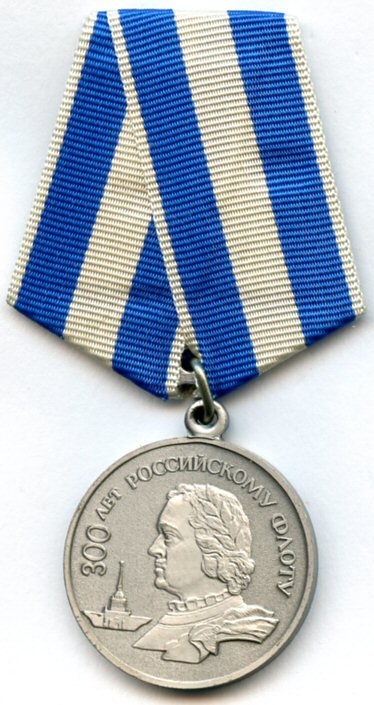
- Jubilee Medal "300 Years of the Russian Navy" (obverse)
- Type: State Commemorative Medal
- Awarded for: Naval service and/or significant contributions to the navy
- Presented by: Russian Federation
- Eligibility: Citizens of the Russian Federation
- Status: No longer awarded
- Established: February 10, 1996

Highlights
- Total: 160.000
- Ribbon of the Jubilee Medal "300 Years of the Russian Navy"

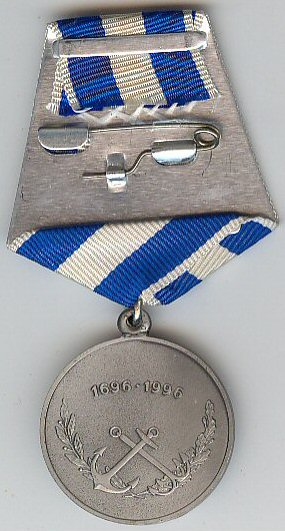
Reverse of the Jubilee Medal "300 Years of the Russian Navy"

The Jubilee Medal "300 Years of the Russian Navy" (Russian: Юбилейная медаль «300 лет Российскому флоту») was a state commemorative medal of the Russian Federation awarded to deserving citizens to denote the 300th anniversary of the Russian Navy. It was established on February 10, 1996 by Presidential Decree No. 176.

== Medal statute ==
The Jubilee Medal "300 Years of the Russian Navy" was awarded to citizens of the Russian Federation, soldiers in the service in the Navy, Marines, Forces of the Federal Border Service of Russia, if previously awarded state awards of the Russian Federation, RSFSR, or USSR, and that impeccably served on ships or naval aircrews for at least 10 years, or in other parts of the navy for 20 years or more, to naval personnel who took part in the fighting against the Nazi invaders and the Japanese militarists in 1941-1945, admirals, generals, officers, warrant officers (ensigns), sailors and petty officers who are in reserve (retired) or that were discharged from the Russian Armed Forces, the Soviet Armed Forces, the Federal Border Service of the Russian Federation or Naval Border Troops of the KGB, if they were previously awarded state awards of the Russian Federation, RSFSR or USSR and impeccably served in the Navy, Marines or Naval Forces of the Federal Border Service of the Russian Federation or Naval Border Troops of the KGB on ships or in naval aviation for 10 years or more or in other parts of the navy for 20 years or more; to civilian personnel on support ships of the Navy, seafarers and marine scientists, of river, fishing, research, or expeditionary fleets, if they previously received state awards of the Russian Federation, RSFSR or USSR and worked flawlessly on vessels for 15 years or more, to designers, developers, managers of design bureaus, research institutions and organizations, educational institutions, heads of central government shipbuilding industry, the workers of basic professions directly involved in the construction and repair of ships and vessels, if they previously received state awards of the Russian Federation, RSFSR or the USSR and worked flawlessly in their area of specialty or profession for 20 years or more, to heads of the central basin management bodies, heads of research institutions, educational institutions, sea, river, fishing, research, and expeditionary fleets, if they previously received state awards of the Russian Federation, RSFSR or USSR and worked flawlessly in these areas for more than 20 years.

Presidential Decree 1099 of September 7, 2010 removed the Jubilee Medal "300 Years of the Russian Navy" from the list of state awards of the Russian Federation. It is no longer awarded.

== Medal description ==
The Jubilee Medal "300 Years of the Russian Navy" is a circular silvered tombac medal, 32 mm in diameter, with raised rims on both sides. On the obverse in relief, in the background at the lower left, the Admiralty building, at center, the left profile bust of Peter the Great. Along the top edge, the inscription in relief "300 Years of the Russian Navy" (Russian: "300 лет Российскому флоту"). On the reverse, the relief inscription "1696–1996", in the lower part, laurel and oak branches around the image of crossed anchors (sea and river).

The medal is suspended by a ring through the award's suspension loop to a standard Russian pentagonal mount covered with an overlapping 24 mm-wide white silk moiré ribbon with two 7 mm-wide blue stripes located 1 mm from the ribbon's edges.

== Recipients (partial list) ==
The individuals below were all recipients of the Jubilee Medal "300 Years of the Russian Navy".

- Politician Vladimir Borisovich Rushailo
- Director of the FSB Nikolai Platonovich Patrushev
- Fleet Admiral Vladimir Yegorov
- Colonel General Gennady Nikolayevich Troshev
- Former Airborne Lieutenant General, politician Vladimir Anatolyevich Shamanov
- Hero of the Russian Federation, Major General Timur Avtandilovich Apakidze
- Chairman of the Russian Central Bank Viktor Vladimirovich Gerashchenko
- Hero of the Soviet Union, test pilot Viktor Georgiyevich Pugachyov
- Fleet Admiral Vladimir Ivanovich Kuroyedov
- Scientist (mathematician and physicist) Gury Ivanovich Marchuk
- Former GRU Colonel, politician Vladimir Vasilievich Kvachkov
- Former Army General, former Interior Minister Anatoly Sergeevich Kulikov
- AEROFLOT Director Vitaly Gennadyevich Savelyev
- Former Prime Minister of Russia Viktor Stepanovich Chernomyrdin

== See also ==
- Awards and decorations of the Russian Federation
- Russian Navy
- List of Russian naval engineers
