= Rockwell-MBB X-31 =

Experimental aircraft

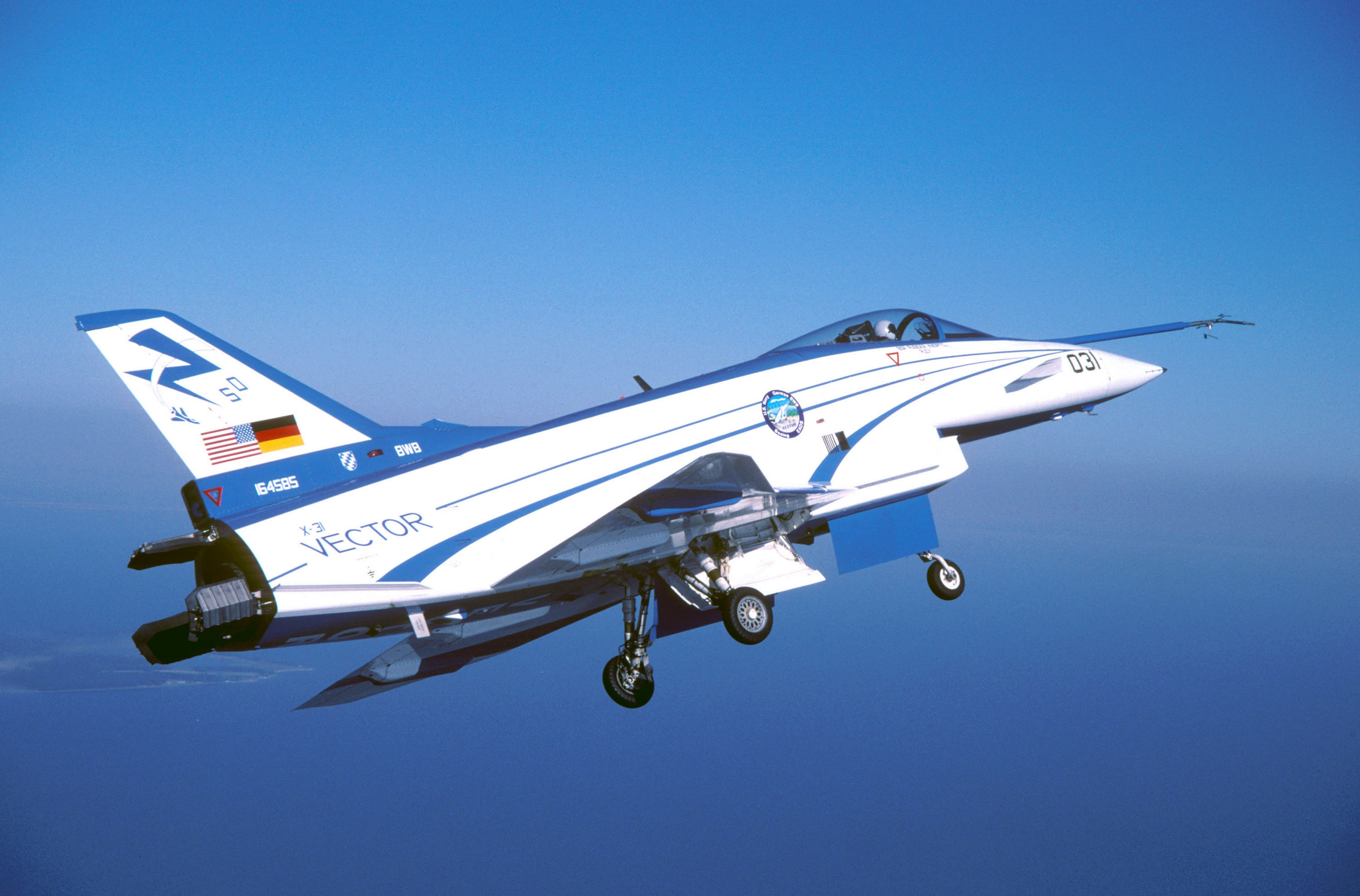
- The X-31 aircraft returns from a test flight for VECTOR.

General information
- Type: Experimental aircraft
- National origin: United States / Germany
- Manufacturer: Rockwell / Messerschmitt-Bölkow-Blohm
- Primary users: DARPA NASA; DLR
- Number built: 2

History
- First flight: 11 October 1990

The Rockwell-Messerschmitt-Bölkow-Blohm X-31 is an experimental jet aircraft designed to test fighter thrust vectoring technology. It was designed and built by Rockwell and Messerschmitt-Bölkow-Blohm (MBB), as part of a joint United States and German Enhanced Fighter Maneuverability program to provide additional control authority in pitch and yaw, for significantly more maneuverability than most conventional fighters. An advanced flight control system provided controlled flight at high angles of attack where conventional aircraft would stall or lose control. Two aircraft were built, of which one has survived.

== Design and development ==
As the first international X-plane program, the Defense Advanced Research Projects Agency (DARPA) was the US Government's top-level management, with the US Navy serving as the military agent through Naval Air Systems Command (NAVAIR). NASA supported the X-31 program through its Langley Research Center and Dryden Flight Research Center. The US Air Force Flight Test Center was a Participating Test Organization.

The X-31 design was essentially an all-new airframe design, although it borrowed heavily on design elements and sometimes actual parts of previous production, prototype, and conceptual aircraft designs, including the British Aerospace Experimental Aircraft Programme (choice of wing type with canards, plus underfuselage intake), the German TKF-90 (wing planform concepts and underfuselage intake), F/A-18 Hornet (forebody, including cockpit, ejection seat, and canopy; electrical generators), F-16 Fighting Falcon (landing gear, fuel pump, rudder pedals, nosewheel tires, and emergency power unit), F-16XL (leading-edge flap drives), V-22 Osprey (control surface actuators), Cessna Citation (main landing gear's wheels and brakes), F-20 Tigershark (hydrazine emergency air-start system, later replaced) and B-1 Lancer (spindles from its control vanes used for the canards). This was done on purpose, so that development time and risk would be reduced by using flight-qualified components. To reduce the cost of tooling for a production run of only two aircraft, Rockwell developed the "fly-away tooling" concept (perhaps the most successful spinoff of the program), whereby 15 fuselage frames were manufactured via CNC, tied together with a holding fixture, and attached to the factory floor with survey equipment. That assembly then became the tooling for the plane, which was built around it, thus "flying away" with its own tooling.

Two X-31s were built, with the first flying on October 11, 1990. Over 500 test flights were carried out from 1990 to 1995. The X-31 is a canard delta, a delta wing aircraft which uses canard foreplanes for primary pitch control, with secondary thrust-vectoring control. The canard delta had earlier been used on the Saab Viggen strike fighter, and has since become common on fighters such as the Eurofighter Typhoon, Dassault Rafale and Gripen which were all designed and flew several years before the X-31. The X-31 featured a cranked-delta wing (similar to the Saab 35 Draken and the F-16XL prototype), and fixed strakes along the aft fuselage, as well as a pair of movable computer-controlled canards to increase stability and maneuverability. Similar to a tailless aircraft, there are no moveable horizontal tail surfaces, only the vertical fin with rudder. Pitch and roll are controlled by the canard with the aid of the three paddles directing the exhaust (thrust vectoring). Eventually, simulations and flight tests on one of the X-31s showed that flight would be stable without the vertical fin, because the thrust-vectoring nozzle provided sufficient yaw and pitch control.

During flight testing, the X-31 aircraft established several milestones. On November 6, 1992, the X-31 achieved controlled flight at a 70° angle of attack. On April 29, 1993, the second X-31 successfully executed a rapid minimum-radius, 180° turn using a post-stall maneuver, flying well outside the range of angle of attack normal for conventional aircraft. This maneuver has been called the "Herbst maneuver" after Dr. Wolfgang Herbst, an MBB employee and proponent of using post-stall flight in air-to-air combat. Herbst was the designer of the Rockwell SNAKE, which formed the basis for the X-31.

In the mid-1990s, the program began to revitalize and so the US and Germany signed a Memorandum of Agreement in April 1999 to start collaboration on the VECTOR program to capitalize on this previous investment. The $53 million VECTOR program began in January 2000. VECTOR is a joint venture that includes the US Navy, Germany's defense procurement agency BWB, Boeing's Phantom Works, and DASA; it was initially expected to involve Sweden, which pulled out due to fiscal constraints. As the site for the flight testing, Naval Air Station Patuxent River in Maryland was chosen. From 2002 to 2003, the X-31 flew extremely short takeoff and landing approaches first on a virtual runway at 5,000 feet (1,500 m) in the sky, to ensure that the Inertial Navigation System/Global Positioning System accurately guides the aircraft with the centimeter accuracy required for on the ground landings. The program then culminated in the first ever autonomous landing of a crewed aircraft with high angle of attack (24 degree) and short landing. The technologies involved a differential GPS System based on pseudolite technology from Integrinautics and a miniaturized flush air data system from Nordmicro.

=== Aircraft built ===
- BuNo 164584, 292 flights – crashed on January 19, 1995, north of Edwards AFB, California. The crash was caused by ice inside the pitot tube, sending incorrect airspeed data to the flight control computers. Contributing factors included the replacement of a heated pitot tube with an unheated Kiel probe, and ground crew/pilot ignorance of an option to override computer control. The pilot ejected safely. NASA issued in 2005 a film, "X-31: Breaking the Chain", reviewing the events. The novelty of the X-31 trials was computer control of its revolutionary flight controls (canard wing and engine baffles) to effect maneuvers impossible for conventional jet fighters. The film discusses at length the combination of independent errors (e.g. that the accompanying chase pilot could not hear the test pilot's radio conversation with his base) in prompting loss of control, when the test pilot (correctly) ejected to save his life. Film of the crash shows the aircraft in unusual attitudes as the computer applied its false data to attempt to control flight after the pilot ejected.
- BuNo 164585, 288 flights, the last one being in 2003. Put on permanent display at Deutsches Museum Flugwerft Schleissheim in Germany.

== Specifications (X-31) ==
Orthographic projection of the Rockwell X-31.

Data from Jane's All The World's Aircraft 1993–94

General characteristics

- Crew: 1
- Length: 13.21 m (43 ft 4 in)
- Wingspan: 7.26 m (23 ft 10 in)
- Height: 4.44 m (14 ft 7 in)
- Wing area: 21.02 m^{2} (226.3 sq ft)
- Airfoil: Rockwell 5.5%
- Empty weight: 5,175 kg (11,409 lb)
- Gross weight: 6,622 kg (14,600 lb)
- Max takeoff weight: 7,228 kg (15,935 lb)
- Powerplant: 1 × General Electric F404-GE-400 turbofan engine, 71 kN (16,000 lbf) thrust

Performance

- Maximum speed: 1,449 km/h (900 mph, 782 kn)
- Maximum speed: Mach 1.28
- Service ceiling: 12,200 m (40,000 ft)
- Rate of climb: 218 m/s (42,900 ft/min)
- Wing loading: 315.0 kg/m^{2} (64.5 lb/sq ft)

== See also ==
- Comparison of 21st century fighter aircraft
- Future Offensive Air System

Aircraft of comparable role, configuration, and era

- Grumman X-29
- High Alpha Research Vehicle
- General Dynamics X-62 VISTA
- McDonnell Douglas F-15 STOL/MTD

Related lists

- List of experimental aircraft
- List of military aircraft of the United States
