= Chengdu J-36 =

Chinese sixth generation fighter aircraft

J-36
- A Chengdu J-36 prototype

General information
- Type: Stealth multirole aircraft
- National origin: China
- Manufacturer: Chengdu Aircraft Corporation
- Status: Flight testing
- Number built: At least 5 prototypes

History
- First flight: Unknown, first publicly observed on 26 December 2024

The name Chengdu J-36 (Chinese: 歼-36; pinyin: Jiān Sānliù) is a speculative designation given by military analysts to a trijet tailless diamond-double-delta winged aircraft under development by the Chengdu Aircraft Corporation (CAC). On 26 December 2024, an aircraft believed to be a J-36 was spotted conducting test flights in Chengdu, Sichuan, China. Since the aircraft's serial number (36011) begins with '36,' following the People's Liberation Army Air Force convention, this model was presumably designated as J-36.

The J-36 is part of China's sixth-generation aircraft development program (which also includes the Shenyang J-50). Analysts forecast that the heavy stealth aircraft will be used for multiple possible mission sets including air superiority, strike missions, interception and command and control of aircraft teaming operations. It has been projected to enter service in the early 2030s.

== Development ==
In 2018, Chengdu Aircraft Corporation reportedly submitted eight proposals for the sixth-generation fighter design, and four designs were tested in low-altitude wind tunnels. In January 2019, Dr. Wang Haifeng, chief designer of the Chengdu Aircraft Corporation (CAC) announced that China had begun pre-research on a sixth-generation aircraft, predicting that the program would come to fruition by 2035. The plan was reiterated by Chinese state media in 2021. In October 2021, a fighter aircraft with a tailless design was spotted in Chengdu Aircraft Corporation facilities.

In September 2022, United States Air Force (USAF) General Mark D. Kelly, head of the Air Combat Command (ACC) suggested China was on track with the aforementioned characteristics for its six-generation fighter program, and he believed the Chinese design uses a 'system of systems' approach like the United States, which allows for "exponential" reductions in stealth signature and improvements in processing power and sensing.

In February 2023, Aviation Industry Corporation of China (AVIC) shared its six-generation fighter aircraft concept on social media. The featured concept included diamond-shaped wings and tailless design, which correlated with earlier images released in various AVIC presentations.

On 26 December 2024, online photos and videos showed that CAC has publicly flown a prototype aircraft in Chengdu, Sichuan. The reveal coincided with the spotting of the Shenyang J-50 from its sister company, Shenyang Aircraft Corporation. The aircraft was spotted flying around an airport owned by CAC and features a trijet tailless flying wing design. It was followed by a Chengdu J-20S twin-seater stealth fighter as the chase plane. Some photos showed the aircraft painted with code number '36' on the forward fuselage, thus, the aircraft was tentatively named J-36 by military analysts. Analysts speculated the aircraft may be either a sixth-generation fighter prototype or a regional bomber prototype design previously known as the JH-XX. Observers believed that CAC chose to carry out the flight on 26 December in commemoration of Mao Zedong's birthday.

The Chinese Ministry of Defense, People's Liberation Army, the Chinese aviation industry, and the Chinese state media did not confirm or report on the testing or aircraft. Still, analysts believed the lack of control on video footage spread was intentional to incite discussion and debates on the projects. The aircraft was eventually reported by Chinese state media in March 2025, referred to as the ginkgo leaf jet.

On 22 April 2025, the South China Morning Post reported that a flight control system designed for tailless flying wing aircraft landing on the deck of an aircraft carrier was published by the design team of the J-36, indicating a possible naval variant of the aircraft under development.

In October 2025, the J-36 received a major redesign with its second prototype. Analysts noted changes in intake type, landing gear configuration, and the addition of thrust-vectoring nozzles. These changes were designed for better stealth and maneuverability.

On 17 September 2026, a photo surfaced of an AVIC poster that seemingly depicted the J-36 fitted with a high-energy laser weapon, along with heavily redacted preliminary specifications for the system.

== Design ==
=== Overview ===
The prototype is a trijet tailless flying wing aircraft with a voluminous, blended, diamond-like double delta wing configuration, optimized for transonic and supersonic flight. The wings have a leading-edge kink, resulting in two sweep angles. The fighter is large in size, with a thin and wide nose area, cockpit with side-by-side seating and chine lines extending to the wing section.

Behind the nose radome are the electro-optical targeting system (EOTS) windows, tinted canopy, possible side-looking airborne radar (SLAR) arrays, dual-wheel nose landing gear, two under-wing caret inlets, one dorsal intake with diverterless supersonic inlet, double delta wings with one leading-edge extension (LRX) and five trailing edge control surfaces on each wing (including two split flap rudders at outboard wing edges), multiple ventral weapons bays, two sets of tandem-wheel aft landing gear, absence of vertical stabilizer, and trijet engine bays with exhaust troughs and segmented articulation surfaces.

The overall aircraft design is speculated to emphasize all-aspect broadband stealth, high speed, long endurance, high payload capacity, large power generation, and multispectral situational awareness.

=== Stealth ===
The aircraft's shape emphasizes stealth. The dorsal intake allows increased internal volume and shields its radar signature. The engine exhaust petals are recessed in trenches, sitting inward of a deck structure located atop the upper trailing edge. This arrangement helps to block radar and infrared (IR) signature.

The aircraft control hinge lines appear to be covered in flexible skins. Compartment doors are serrated and aligned. All sensors are flush with the fuselage, including the EOTS sit between the radome and canopy, a departure from existing stealth designs. The chine line and cranked wings are connected and continuous, without any tails surfaces, canards, or strakes present, thus providing the foundation for the all-aspect broadband stealth capabilities.

=== Engines ===
The identities, arrangement, and possible differences of the three mounted engines were not yet known in 2025. The stretched diamond double-delta wing provides reduced transonic and supersonic drag. The overall aircraft shape, including wing sweep angles, indicated aerodynamic optimization towards supercruise. The recessed exhausts feature two-dimensional thrust-vectoring control, offering enhanced maneuverability while reducing infrared and radar signatures.

The aircraft's structural size suggests large internal fuel tanks. Analysts placed the aircraft in a range category that could operate up to the second island chain of the western Pacific (to the east of the Philippines and Japan).

=== Weapons and armaments ===
The primary weapons bay has an approximate length of 7.6 m (25 ft), apparently capable of housing PL-17 beyond-visual-range air-to-air missiles or large air-to-surface munitions, flanked by two smaller bays.

== Operational history ==
=== Flight testing ===
On 17 March 2025, images and videos emerged on Chinese social media of the second public test flight of the J-36 prototype, without the chase aircraft. The new imagery provided additional details, confirming earlier observations on the prototype's trijet configuration with afterburners, dorsal intake with the diverterless supersonic inlet (DSI), streamlined cockpit canopy, and split ruddervons on the outer trailing edges of each wing.

On 7 April 2025, the aircraft was captured in close-up imagery. Geolocation showed the aircraft was landing at the Chengdu Aircraft Corporation test facility, featuring a dedicated aircraft shelter for the J-36. On 21 April 2025, the aircraft was seen performing maneuvers. On 23 April 2025, the aircraft was captured in a rear aspect view, displaying details such as engine exhausts sit inside of the trailing edge, and a cockpit that possibly features side-by-side seating for two pilots.

Multiple flight testing continued in May and June 2025, with more detailed photographs emerging. The aircraft was confirmed to have a broad nose with large electro-optical aperture windows on the side, trapezoidal dorsal and lower air intakes, a raised access panel (or air brake) behind the dorsal intake, three weapons bays with a larger one in the middle and two smaller ones flanked on each side, and a cockpit with a side-by-side seating arrangement, with each pilot featuring their own head-up display (HUD).

In October 2025, the second prototype of the J-36 started flight testing. Analysts observed some structural changes. The new prototype featured redesigned exhausts with two-dimensional thrust vectoring petals instead of the recessed troughs, which would provide stronger maneuverability but less rear-aspect stealth. The revised side intakes no longer had the caret-shaped surfaces; instead, the design opted for diverterless supersonic inlet (DSI). The new aft landing gears were changed from tandem to parallel fashion that likely save more internal space.

In November 2025, an investigation conducted by The War Zone on satellite images found that both Chengdu J-36 and Shenyang J-XD aircraft were stationed between August and September 2025 at a Chinese military airfield near Lop Nur, a place known to host top-secret aerospace test flights in China, akin to the United States Area 51. Their appearances at the same base indicated the Chinese military was actively developing two advanced fighter programs in parallel.

On 25 December 2025, the alleged third prototype of the J-36 was observed in Chengdu undergoing flight testing, which was followed by a Chengdu J-10 as the chase aircraft. The third prototype lacked the pitot tube on the radome. In February 2026, the fourth prototype was spotted in China. In July 2026, the fifth prototype appeared, displaying refinements made to the airframe design.

On 7 September 2026, reports claimed that China had expanded its Lop Nur flight-test facility to speed up development of its next-generation military aircraft, including the J-36, roughly doubling the size of the base since 2025.

On 23 September 2026, new test footage of the J-36 prototypes began emerging online. The footage displayed several new details, including conformal antennas, the possible radar installation, and revised thrust-vectoring nozzles. The AVIC also presented laser weapon subsystems for the J-36 at the tech exhibition in China.

== Strategic implications ==
Days after the December 2024 flight, United States Secretary of the Air Force Frank Kendall commented that the experimental aircraft testing and modernization efforts by China had been expected by the United States Air Force (USAF) leadership and did not affect the American Next Generation Air Dominance (NGAD) program, which had been put on pause for review.

Bryan Clark of the Hudson Institute suggested that the Chengdu aircraft might be a potential adversary of future US sixth-generation aircraft and gave American planners an incentive to continue the NGAD program. USAF official Andrew P. Hunter in 2025 acknowledged that the J-36 might achieve initial operational capability (IOC) earlier than planes under the American sixth-generation fighter programs, but believed the USAF system would likely produce the better product. Kenneth Wilsbach of the Air Combat Command (ACC) at the time called for continuation of the NGAD program, citing increasing risks posed by Chinese sixth generation aircraft development.

Speaking in the middle of 2025, both the PLAAF and USAF leadership considered the aircraft a "sixth-generation" air superiority aircraft. From a PLAAF perspective, Wang Wei, deputy commander of the PLAAF, confirmed in an interview with state-owned media in March 2025 that the J-36 is the PLAAF's interpretation of a "sixth-generation" aircraft. At the time, the USAF leadership also considered the aircraft to be a "sixth-generation" air superiority fighter.

When the J-36 first appeared at the end of 2024, experts, however, debated its primary role. At the time, the specific capabilities of the aircraft with regard to it being, or not being, a sixth-generation platform were unknown, because not enough public information was available. By early January 2025 commentators had already speculated on a range of possible roles for the aircraft, including heavy fighter, fighter-bomber, interceptor, bomber, or strike aircraft, given its large size, lengthened payload bay, and aerodynamic optimization intended for speed and range. However, analysts also warned that pigeonholing the J-36 into a traditional role, such as "fighter" or "bomber", might be a simplification that fails to fully grasp the roles and capabilities the J-36 might have in the context of future aerial warfare and strategy.

Bill Sweetman, writing for the Australian Strategic Policy Institute in January 2025, speculated that the J-36 could serve as a supercruising launching platform for long-range missiles and a command and control hub for other manned and unmanned aircraft and that the J-36's overall size and flight performance should be categorized as a new category of aircraft, which he named the "airborne cruiser". David Axe, writing in the Daily Telegraph in January 2025, picked up on the "airborne cruiser" designation, and added that America would struggle to catch up with China's development efforts in this respect.

Justin Bronk of the Royal United Services Institute (RUSI) suggested in 2025 that large crewed aircraft might offer unique strategic advantages for both China and the US in the Indo-Pacific region, which has limited forward bases and increasing threats from missiles, drones, and from an electronic warfare (EW) environment. Bronk argued that while distributed uncrewed systems, such as collaborative combat aircraft (CCA), offer cost-effective combat mass, their reliance on datalinks makes them vulnerable to electronic-warfare disruption, highlighting the enduring value of crewed aircraft like the J-36, which can operate independently in contested environments.

== Specifications (prototype) ==
Data from Janes

General characteristics

- Crew: 2 (side by side seating)
- Powerplant: 3 × Engines

Performance Armament

- Guns: Laser weapon (possibility)
- Hardpoints: Primary and secondary weapons bay for internal hardpoints

Avionics

- Active electronically scanned array (AESA) radar
- Electro-optical targeting system (EOTS)

== See also ==
- JH-XX
- Sixth-generation fighter

Aircraft of comparable role, configuration, and era

- Boeing F-47
- Boeing F/A-XX
- Shenyang J-50
- Mikoyan PAK DP
- Global Combat Air Programme
- New Generation Fighter

Related lists

- List of fighter aircraft
- List of aircraft produced by China
- List of active People's Liberation Army aircraft
