= Shenyang J-50 =

Chinese fighter aircraft project

J-50
- A Shenyang J-50 prototype

General information
- Type: Stealth multirole aircraft
- National origin: China
- Manufacturer: Shenyang Aircraft Corporation
- Status: Flight testing
- Number built: 2 confirmed

History
- First flight: Unknown, first publicly observed on 26 December 2024

The Shenyang J-50, J-XD, or J-XDS, is a temporary designation given by military analysts and defense media to a twinjet tailless lambda wing aircraft under development by the Shenyang Aircraft Corporation (SAC). The aircraft was observed in flight testing in Shenyang, Liaoning, China, in December 2024, which was tentatively named Shenyang J-XD or Shenyang J-50 by analysts, given the limited available information.

== History ==
In 2018, Shenyang Aircraft Corporation (SAC) reportedly developed prototypes for the next-generation aircraft.

In September 2022, United States Air Force (USAF) General Mark D. Kelly, head of the Air Combat Command (ACC) suggested China was on track with its six-generation fighter program, and he believed the Chinese design uses a 'system of systems' approach like the United States, which allows for "exponential" reductions in stealth signature and improvements in processing power and sensing.

On 26 December 2024, a new Shenyang prototype aircraft, believed to be part of the Chinese sixth-generation fighter program, was spotted near Shenyang Aircraft Corporation's facilities. The reveal coincided with the spotting of the Chengdu J-36 from its sister company, Chengdu Aircraft Corporation. Unconfirmed reports suggested the Shenyang fighter made its maiden flight on 20 December 2024. The Shenyang aircraft prototype seemed to be smaller than the Chengdu one. It was trailed by a Shenyang J-16 strike fighter as the chase plane.

Subsequent new images, which appeared in January and April 2025, allowed observations to confirm several details, including the aircraft's lambda wing configuration, swivelable wingtips, and twin-engine with apparent thrust vectoring nozzles, while debunking a hypothesis suggesting the aircraft has folding empennage. The aircraft cockpit canopy was not visible from imagery of December 2024, leading to diverging theories on it being a crewed, uncrewed, or optionally crewed aircraft. Subsequent photos in April 2025 confirmed it as a crewed aircraft.

The aircraft continued conducting flight testing in May 2025, revealing details such as the long nose section with a chin-mounted electro-optical targeting system (EOTS) turret, small side panels located on the forward fuselage, and the cockpit with likely a single pilot seat.

On 25 September 2025, social media photos revealed the possible second prototype of the aircraft taxiing inside Shenyang Aircraft Corporation facilities, without any air data sensor mounted.

In November 2025, an investigation conducted by The War Zone on satellite images found that both Chengdu J-36 and Shenyang J-XD aircraft were stationed between August and September 2025 at an experimental Chinese military airfield near Lop Nur, a place known to host top-secret aerospace test flights in China, akin to the United States Area 51. Their appearances at the same base indicated the Chinese military was actively supporting the development of two programs in parallel.

== Design ==
The Shenyang prototype fighter features a cranked arrow configuration with sharply swept lambda wings and articulating, swivelable wing tips acting as control surfaces. The lambda wing design has a triangular trailing-edge extension that connects to the end of the engine bay, increasing aspect ratio and improving the aerodynamic efficiency compared to traditional trapezoidal wing. Each wing also features a differential leading-edge extension (LEX) and multiple trailing-edge control surfaces. The aircraft has a wide, long nose radome, divided by a prominent chine line. Above is a streamlined bubble canopy blending with the upper fuselage, housing a single pilot. Underneath the nose section, an electro-optical targeting system (EOTS) housing is mounted, which is followed by two V-shaped ventral intakes with diverterless supersonic inlet (DSI). At the tail are twin-engine bays with serrated, thrust vectoring nozzles.

The aircraft has a twin-wheeled nose landing gear and two single-wheeled aft landing gears in a tricycle configuration. Two ventral weapons bays are visible, with a centerline tunnel indented in between the two bays. Side panels are also visible, either for weapons or internal access. The medium size of the aircraft was speculated to be more suitable for operations on aircraft carriers.

== See also ==
- JH-XX
- Sixth-generation fighter

Aircraft of comparable role, configuration, and era

- Chengdu J-36
- Boeing F-47
- Boeing F/A-XX
- Mikoyan PAK DP
- Global Combat Air Programme
- Future Combat Air System

Related lists

- List of fighter aircraft
- List of aircraft produced by China
- List of active People's Liberation Army aircraft
