= Lambda wing =

Combat aircraft wing design

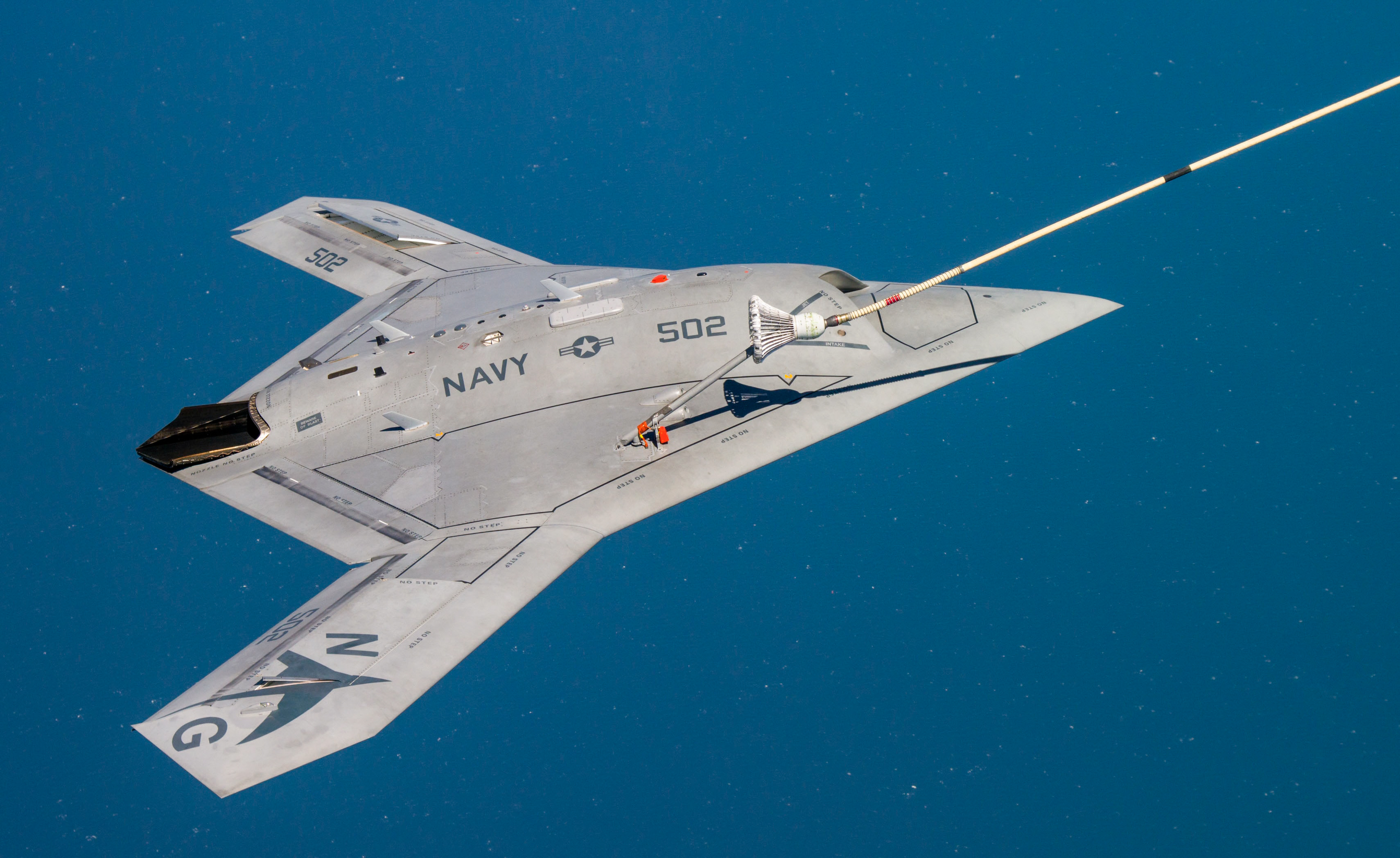
Northrop Grumman X-47B, a typical lambda wing unmanned combat aerial vehicle.

A lambda wing is a wing whose trailing edge resembles the Greek uppercase letter lambda (Λ). A lambda wing has a dramatically smaller radar cross section than a delta wing, and so is commonly featured on stealth aircraft—for example, the Northrop B-2 Spirit and Northrop Grumman B-21 Raider. Like these strategic bombers, aircraft with lambda wings are often tailless.

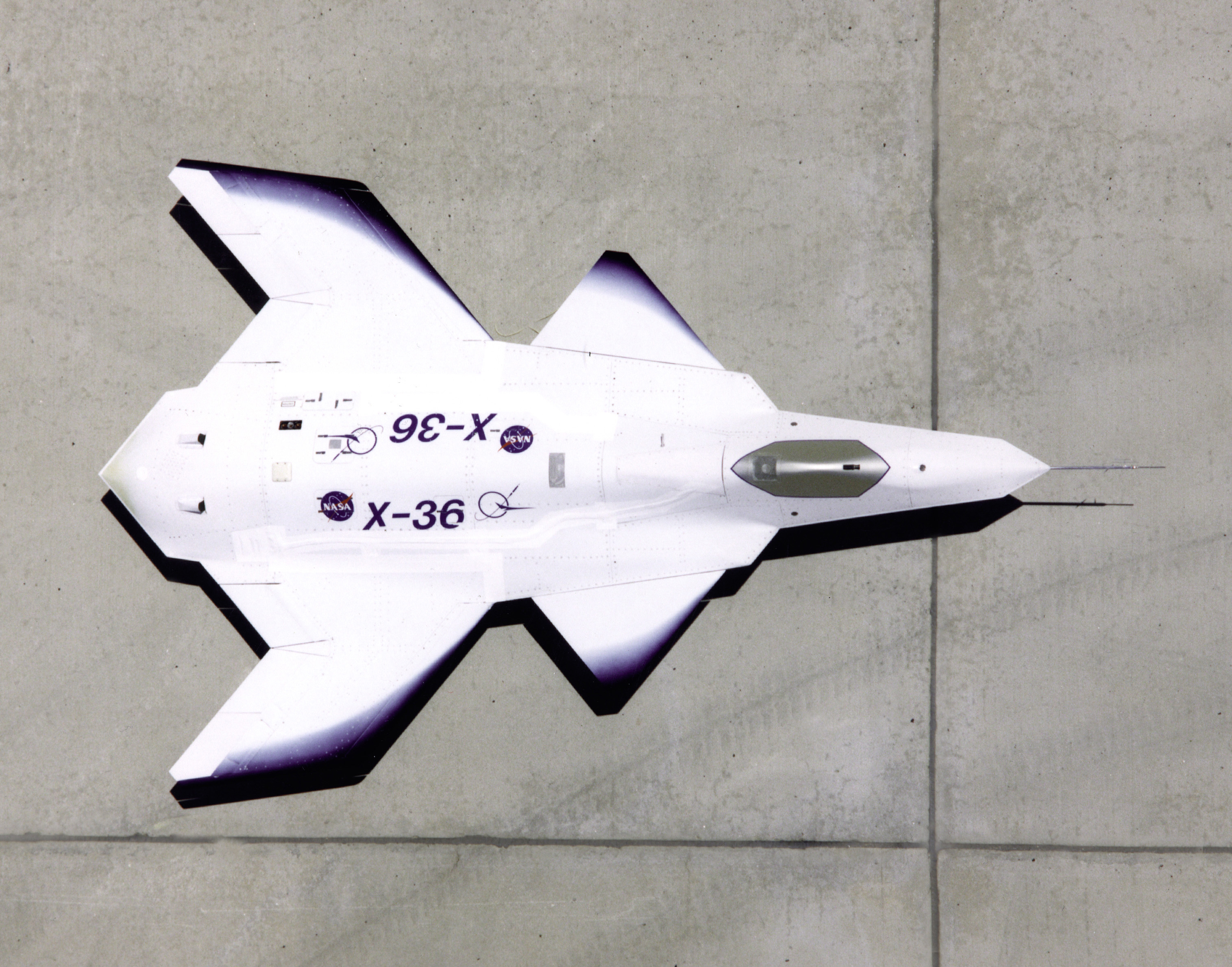
McDonnell Douglas X-36, an early study in lambda wings, also using canards

An early experiment with a lambda wing on smaller aircraft was the McDonnell Douglas X-36, which first flew in 1997. Similar designs have been used on unmanned combat aerial vehicles (UCAVs), including the Boeing X-45, Northrop Grumman X-47B, Dassault nEUROn, and BAE Systems Taranis.

The UK-Italian-Japanese Global Combat Air Programme considered but abandoned a lambda wing design. The wing is used in Lockheed Martin's "Vectis" proposal for the Collaborative Combat Aircraft program.

In 2023, Beihang University researchers proposed moving wingtips as a solution to the wing’s aerodynamic instabilities, which caused the 2008 Andersen Air Force Base B-2 crash. The Chinese Shenyang J-50, known to be flight testing since 2024, is reported to use a lambda wing with moving wingtips. A tailless lambda wing UCAV dubbed "Type A" was displayed during the 2025 China Victory Day Parade.

The Boeing F-47 has been speculated to use a wing that resembles those of the X-36, the Boeing Bird of Prey, and IAIO Qaher-313.

== See also ==
- Sixth-generation fighter
- Next Generation Air Dominance
