= Xi'an H-20 =

Military aircraft by Xi'an

H-20

General information
- Type: Stealth strategic bomber
- National origin: People's Republic of China
- Manufacturer: Xi'an Aircraft Industrial Corporation
- Status: Under development
- Primary user: People's Liberation Army Air Force

The Xi'an H-20 (Chinese: 轰-20; pinyin: Hōng-20; alternatively Xi'an H-X) is a projected subsonic stealth bomber design of the People's Liberation Army Air Force. It is referred to as a strategic project by the People's Liberation Army, and will be the first dedicated strategic bomber developed by China.

The development of a strategic bomber was revealed in September 2016.

== Design and development ==
In 2016, former People's Liberation Army Air Force (PLAAF) general Ma Xiaotian announced that China was developing a new type of long-range bomber on the air force's open day. In 2018, a Chinese military spokesperson confirmed the development was making "great progress".

According to the United States Department of Defense, the H-20 is expected to be a flying wing with a range of at least 8,500 km and a payload capacity of at least 10 tonnes; according to the RAND Corporation, an American funded thinktank, it will allow China "to reliably threaten U.S. targets within and beyond the Second Island Chain, to include key U.S. military bases in Guam and Hawaii." The payload is projected to be at least 10 tonnes of conventional or nuclear weapons.

Throughout the years, multiple models and computer-generated pictures have surfaced on the internet, some published by magazines run by state-owned defense companies. Defense analysts have noted several recurring features on these models, including serrated air intakes, cranked-kite wings, and foldable twin tail surfaces that can be switched between being horizontal tailplanes and V-tails.

In July 2022, Chinese state media suggested the H-20 was close to taking its maiden flight. In March 2024, during the second session of the 14th National People's Congress, vice commander of the People's Liberation Army Air Force, Wang Wei, indicated that H-20 will be revealed "very soon". In December 2024, it was indicated that the new bomber may not be fully operational until the 2030s. In January 2025, some images on Chinese social media indicated that test flights of the new bomber had potentially taken place but were not officially confirmed.

== See also ==
- JH-XX

Aircraft of comparable role, configuration, and era

- Northrop Grumman B-2 Spirit
- Northrop Grumman B-21 Raider
- Tupolev PAK DA

Related lists

- List of bomber aircraft
