= Splitter plate (aeronautics) =

Engine intake air diverter

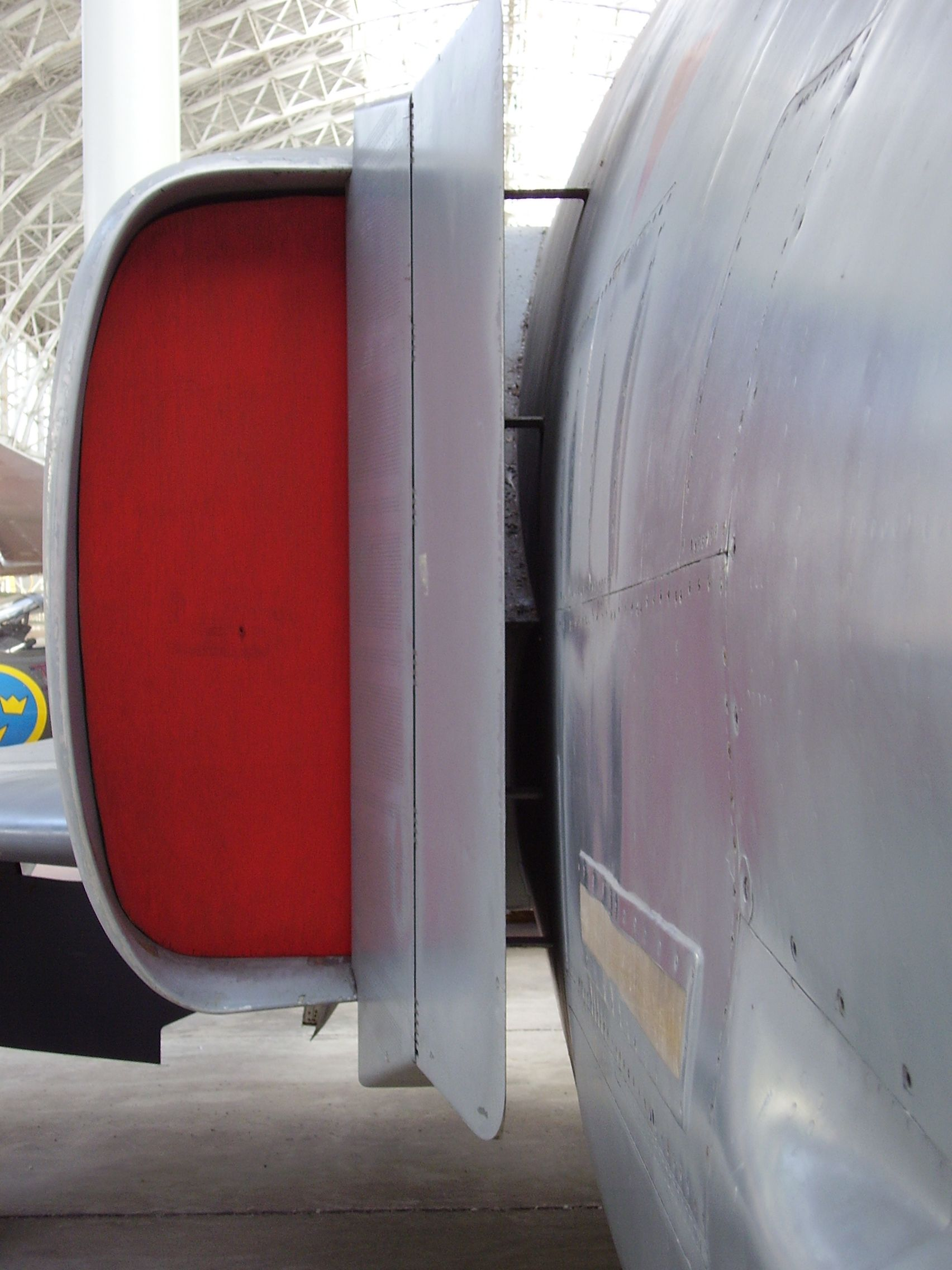
Splitter plate on the fuselage side of an F-4 Phantom II

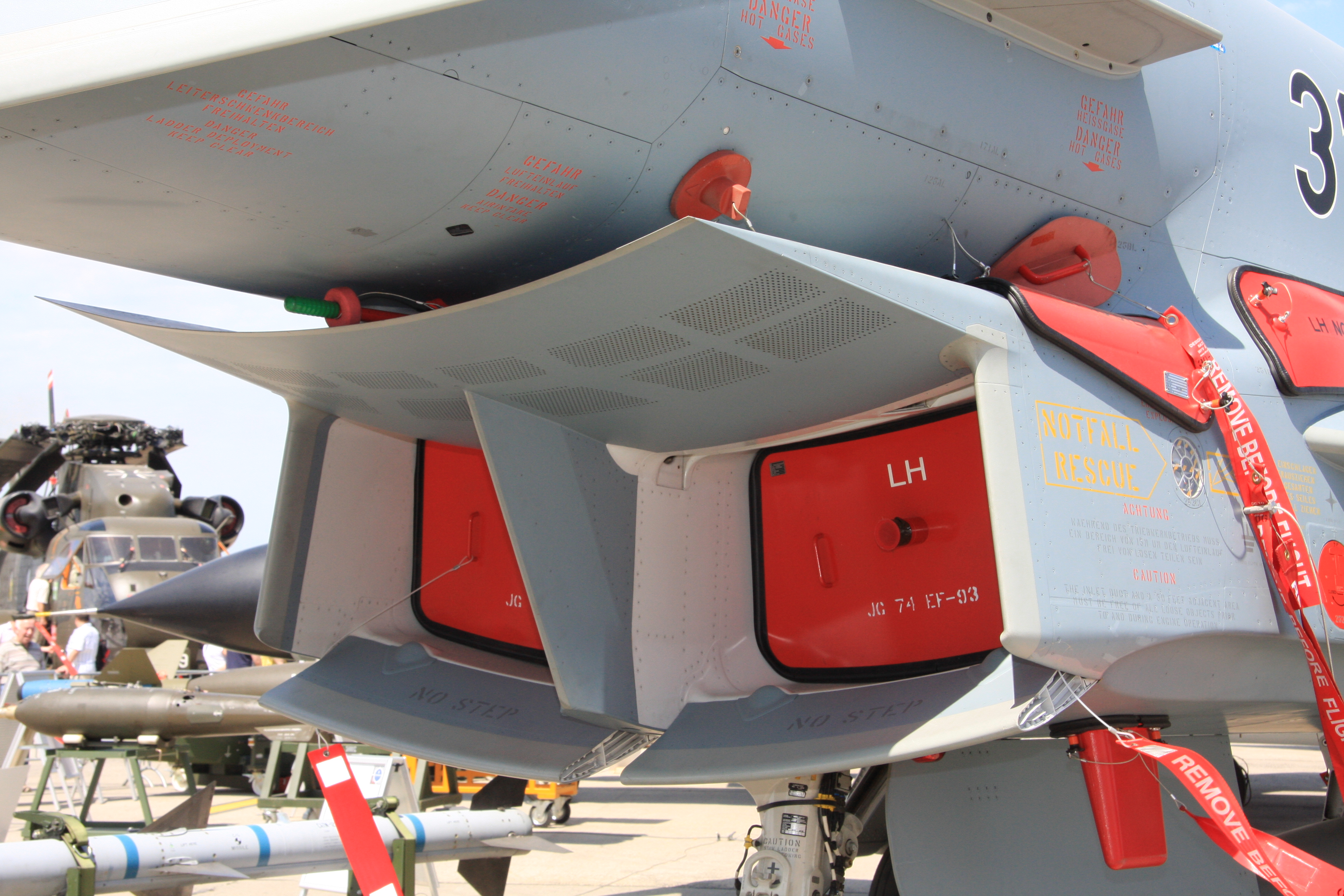
Splitter plate forming a lip on the underside of a Eurofighter Typhoon

A splitter plate is a component in some jet aircraft, used to control the airflow into the engine. Where the engine air intake is mounted partway back along the fuselage or under the wing, the splitter plate diverts the boundary layer away from the engine intake. It is a form of boundary layer control.

== Diverting the boundary layer ==
When a body, such as a wing or a fuselage, passes through a fluid such as the air, a boundary layer of fluid attaches to the body and moves along with it. This boundary layer is turbulent and if it enters the air intake of a jet engine which requires clean and uniform airflow, it can cause distortion and affect performance.

In order to stop this boundary layer problem from happening, a splitter plate may be used to separate the boundary layer from the fast-moving free airflow and divert it away from the engine intake.

Many splitter plates have a series of holes drilled into the surface closer to the engine side of the intake. Suction is applied to these holes, further reducing the boundary layer.

== Airplanes ==
- General Dynamics F-16 Fighting Falcon
- Boeing F-18 Hornet
- HAL Tejas
- Saab JAS 39 Gripen
- Eurofighter Typhoon
- Dassault Rafale
- Chengdu J-10A
- McDonnell Douglas F-4 Phantom II
- North American XB-70 Valkyrie
- Avro Canada CF-105 Arrow
- Avro Vulcan
- Mikoyan-Gurevich MiG-23
- Mikoyan-Gurevich MiG-25
- Mikoyan Project 1.44
- Sukhoi Su-15
- Sukhoi Su-24
- Shenyang J-8B Finback

== See also ==
- Index of aviation articles
- Inlet cone
- Intake ramp
- Diverterless supersonic inlet
- Diffuser (automotive) for automotive splitter plates
