= Diverterless supersonic inlet =

Type of jet engine air intake

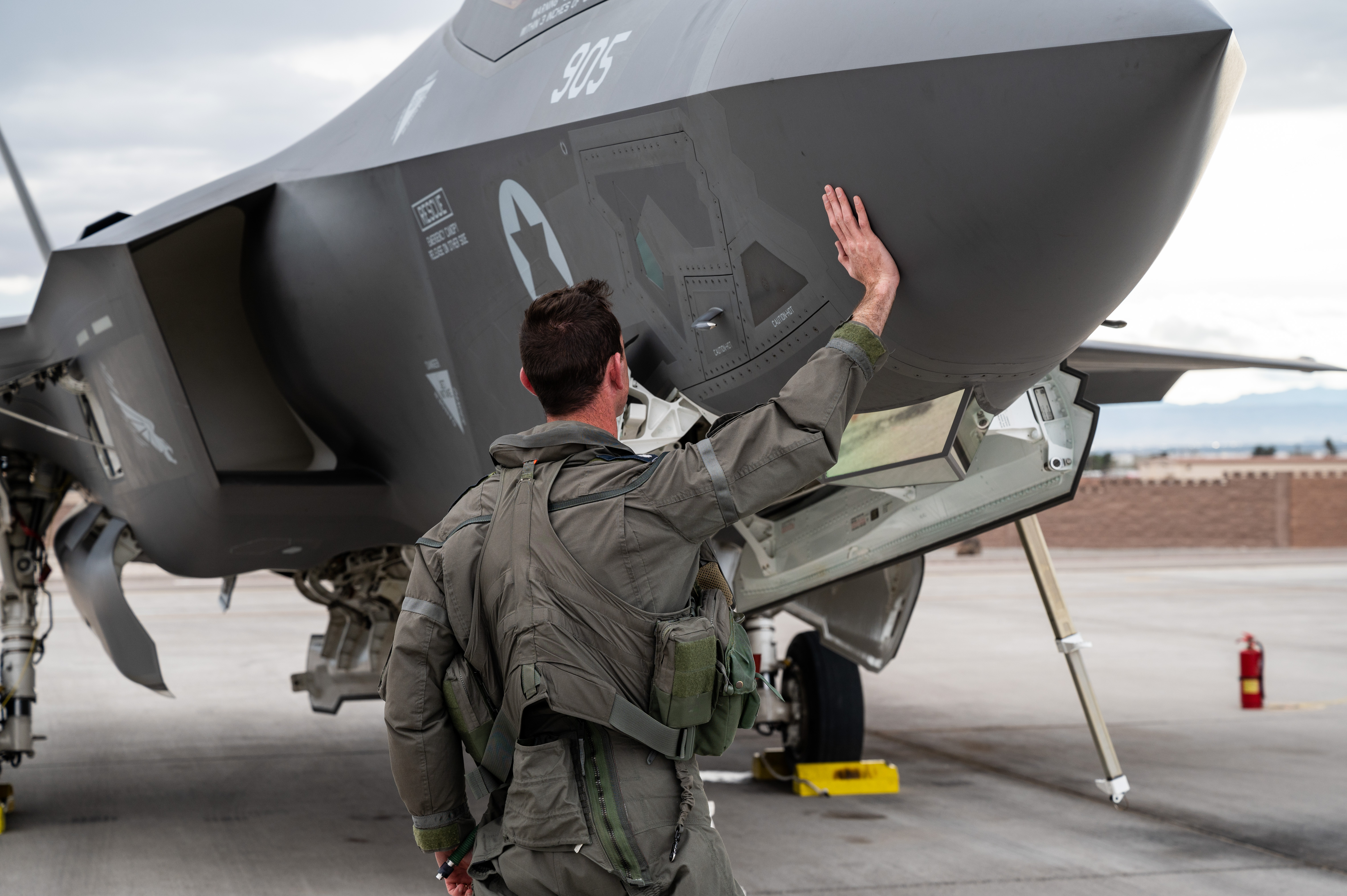
The Lockheed Martin F-35 Lightning II is a major jet fighter design featuring DSI.

A diverterless supersonic inlet (DSI) is a type of jet engine air intake used by some modern combat aircraft to control air flow into their engines. It consists of a "bump" and a forward-swept inlet cowl, which work together to divert boundary layer airflow away from the aircraft's engine. This eliminates the need for a splitter plate, while compressing the air to slow it down from supersonic to subsonic speeds. The DSI can be used to replace conventional methods of controlling supersonic and boundary-layer airflow.

DSIs can be used to replace variable-geometry intake ramps and inlet cones, which are more complex, heavy and expensive. They have become the predominant inlet designs for modern combat aircraft due to their low weight and cost while having relatively decent performance up to Mach 2.

== Technical background ==
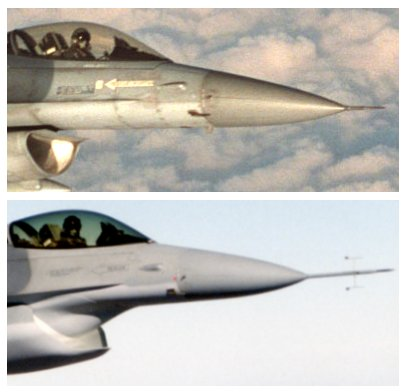
Testing of the F-35 diverterless supersonic inlet on a modified F-16. The original intake with its splitter plate is shown in the top image.

The fundamental design of a gas turbine engine is such that the air flow-rate entering its compressor is regulated by the amount of fuel burned in its combustor. For supersonic flight the air entering the inlet also has to be regulated to a similar amount by the design of the entrance of the inlet duct. The optimum design of the duct will minimize drag on the one hand and unstable shock position (manifested by "buzz") on the other, while presenting clean and uniform airflow to the fan and compressor.

=== Inlets ===
The goal of an engine inlet is to present clean and uniform airflow with minimal distortion to the engine. When a body, such as a wing or a fuselage, passes through a fluid such as the air, a boundary layer of fluid attaches to the body and moves along with it. This boundary layer is turbulent and thickens with increasing airspeed and forebody distance. When it enters the inlet, it can cause airflow distortion and affect engine operation and performance. To prevent the boundary layer from entering the engine, inlets typically incorporate a splitter plate/gap to separate and bypass the layer, or a bleed system to remove it by suction, or a combination of both.

Additionally, on supersonic jets, the high kinetic energy in the approaching air, or dynamic pressure, has to be transformed into static pressure while losing a minimum amount of energy (also known as pressure recovery). To do this the inlets are more complicated than subsonic ones as they have to set up two or three shock waves to compress the air. A cone (such as on the SR-71 or MiG-21) or inclined ramp (such as on the F-15 or Su-27) protrudes ahead of the inlet and is adjusted based on flight conditions, thus having variable geometry, to properly position the shocks with the cowl, ensuring stable operation and efficient pressure recovery. The complexity of these variable-geometry inlets increases with increase in design speed. Simpler fixed-geometry "pitot"-type inlets (such as those found on the F-16 and F/A-18) avoid these complexities, thus reducing weight and cost, but have poorer pressure recovery particularly at higher Mach numbers. More modern fixed-geometry "caret" inlet designs (such as on the F-22) achieve the efficient pressure recovery of variable intake ramps, but still require a splitter gap and bleed system for the boundary layer.

=== Diverterless inlets ===
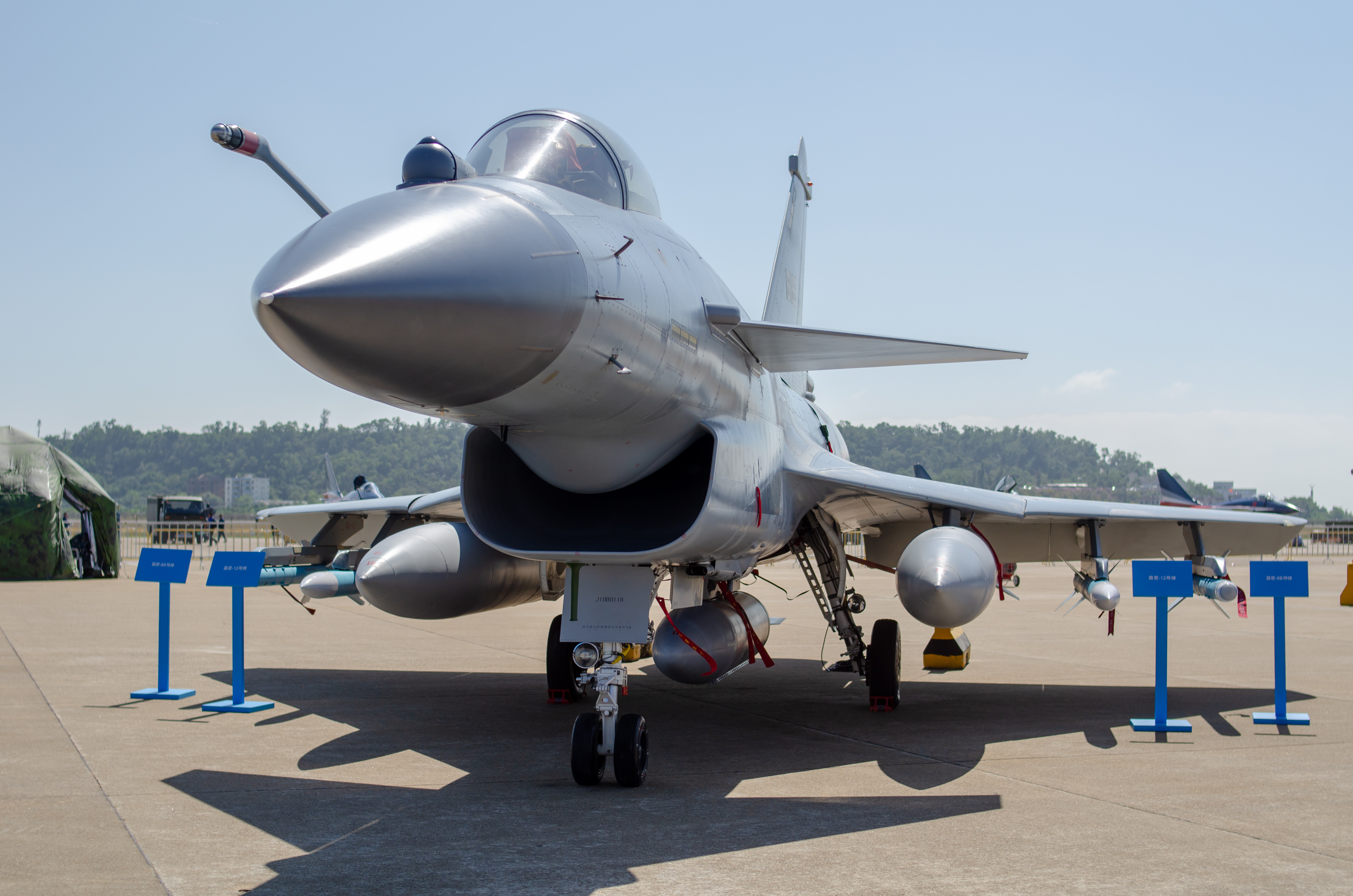
J-10B with a diverterless air intake displayed at Airshow China 2018

The DSI bump is a three dimensional (3-D) non-axisymmetric shape that functions as a compression surface and also creates a pressure distribution that prevents the majority of the boundary layer air from entering the inlet at speeds up to Mach 2. It does this by creating a spanwise static pressure gradient that deflects the forebody's boundary layer to the bump's sides; this bumped surface also performs flow compression at supersonic speeds by producing a conical shock system, serving a similar purpose as an inlet cone. The forward-swept cowl, which closes against the forebody at its aft-most points, then allows the diverted boundary layer to spill out of the sides of the inlet as mass flow ratio decreases, preventing much of it from entering the inlet duct.

In essence, the DSI does away with complex and heavy mechanical systems for boundary layer control and pressure recovery with no moving parts. Because the DSI is highly integrated with the forebody shaping, all geometries must be carefully calculated in 3-D computational fluid dynamics (CFD) to ensure high pressure recovery, good supersonic stability, and acceptable distortion levels.

== History ==
Initial research into the concept was done by Antonio Ferri in the 1950s and was then known as the "Ferri scoop"; it was incorporated in some supersonic designs such as the XF8U-3 Crusader III and the SSM-N-9 Regulus II. The concept was further developed & optimized by Lockheed Martin in the early 1990s using 3-D computational fluid dynamics (CFD) as part of an independent research and development (IRAD) project for an efficient and affordable (reduced cost and weight) Mach 2-class inlet design, and was subsequently termed "diverterless supersonic inlet" (DSI). The first Lockheed DSI was flown on 11 December 1996 as part of a Technology Demonstration project. It was installed on an F-16 Block 30 fighter, replacing the aircraft's original pitot-type intake that included a diverter. The modified F-16 demonstrated a maximum speed of Mach 2.0 (the F-16's clean certified maximum speed) and handling characteristics similar to a normal F-16 with no engine stalls or anomalies, validating CFD predictions. It was also shown that pressure recovery was comparable at transonic and superior at supersonic speeds; subsonic specific excess power was also slightly improved.

The DSI concept was introduced into the Joint Advanced Strike Technology (JAST) program, which later became the Joint Strike Fighter (JSF) program, as a trade study item in mid-1994. It was compared with a traditional "caret" style inlet. The trade studies involved additional CFD, testing, and weight and cost analyses. A DSI was incorporated into the Lockheed Martin JSF design after proving to be 30% lighter and showing lower production and maintenance costs over traditional inlets while still meeting all performance requirements; the weight savings were primarily due to the elimination of the bleed and bypass systems. It was flown on the X-35 in 2000 and further refined for the production F-35.

This concept, also called "bump inlet", has also been employed by Chinese aircraft designers, with the first production iteration from Chengdu Aircraft Design Institute on the JF-17. This first design still had a bleed system with suction holes on the bump for additional boundary layer control. Chengdu further refined its DSI designs with the full elimination of bleed and bypass systems with efficient pressure recovery up to Mach 2, and incorporated it into the J-10B/C and J-20. Research indicated that the DSI's pressure recovery is considerably better than a pitot-type inlet and only slightly lower than a caret inlet while being lighter and less costly; the DSI thus replaced the caret inlet during the J-20's design process. Shenyang Aircraft Corporation has also incorporated the DSI into the FC-31/J-35.

Sukhoi incorporated a bump intake for its T-75 LTS (Russian: Лёгкий Тактический Самолёт - ЛТС, Light Tactical Aircraft), later designated as Su-75. The incorporation of the intake shape, called "U-shape" due to the ventral configuration, is meant to provide better obscuration of the engine compressor face and reduce the aircraft's RCS compared to the company's preceding Su-57 design which had a variable geometry ramp intake that only provided partial obscuration.

== Benefits ==
=== Weight and complexity reduction ===
Traditional aircraft inlets contain many heavy moving parts for bypassing/diverting the boundary layer and/or ensuring efficient pressure recovery during supersonic flight. In comparison, DSI eliminates all moving parts, which makes it far less complex and more reliable than earlier diverter-plate inlets or variable-geometry ramps or cones. The removal of moving parts also reduces the weight of the aircraft.

=== Stealth ===
DSIs improve the aircraft's very-low-observable characteristics by eliminating radar reflections between the diverter and the aircraft's skin. Additionally, the "bump" surface reduces the engine's exposure to radar, significantly reducing a strong source of radar reflection because they provide an additional shielding of engine fans against radar waves.

Analysts have noted that the DSI reduces the need for application of radar-absorbent materials in reducing frontal radar cross section of the aircraft.

== List of aircraft with DSI ==
=== Active ===
- CAC/PAC JF-17 Thunder
- Chengdu J-10B/C
- Chengdu J-20
- Guizhou JL-9G
- Lockheed Martin F-35 Lightning II
- Shenyang J-35

=== Future ===
- HAL AMCA
- HAL TEDBF
- Sukhoi Su-75 Checkmate
- BAE Tempest
- Chengdu J-36
- Shenyang J-50

== See also ==
- Index of aviation articles
