= Intake ramp =

Air intake used on supersonic jet engines

Concorde variable air dam control ramps move to suit flight condition

An intake ramp (or inlet ramp U.S.) is a rectangular, plate-like device within the air intake of a jet engine, designed to generate a number of shock waves to aid the inlet compression process at supersonic speeds; such intakes are also referred to as two dimensional (2-D). The ramp sits at an acute angle to deflect the intake air from the longitudinal direction. At supersonic flight speeds, the deflection of the air stream creates a number of oblique shock waves at each change of gradient along at the ramp. Air crossing each shock wave suddenly slows to a lower Mach number, thus increasing pressure. The intake ramp for 2-D rectangular intakes has its equivalent in the inlet cone for circular/axisymmetric intakes.

== Design and operation ==
Ideally, the first oblique shock wave should intercept the air intake lip, thus avoiding air spillage and pre-entry cowl drag on the outer boundary of the deflected streamtube; the air is finally slowed down to subsonic speeds by a terminal normal shock further downstream. For a fixed geometry intake at zero incidence, this condition can only be achieved at one particular flight Mach number, because the angle of the shock wave (to the longitudinal direction) becomes more acute with increasing aircraft speed.

More advanced supersonic intakes feature a ramp with a number of discrete changes of gradient in order to generate multiple oblique shock waves before the terminal (normal) shock. The first known aircraft to use this is the North American A-5 Vigilante with fully-variable wedge-type air intakes on the sides of the fuselage. In the case of Concorde, the first (converging) intake ramp is followed by a diverging ramp. After the air passes terminal shock at the end of the first ramp it has become subsonic such that the diverging ramp further contributes towards the reduction in airstream velocity and consequently its increase in pressure. This intake design thus ensures excellent pressure recovery and contributes to Concorde's improved fuel efficiency whilst cruising supersonically at up to Mach 2.2 (beyond which airframe heating effects limit any further increase in speed). Variable geometry intakes, such as those on Concorde, vary the ramp angle to focus the series of oblique shock waves onto the intake lip, control of which is accomplished by complex non-linear control laws using the ramp void pressure (the pressure of the air in the gap between the two ramps) as a control input. Some designs such as on the McDonnell Douglas F-15 can also use ramps to vary the capture area for additional airflow control.

Up to Mach 2.2, all the shock compression can be done externally. Above that, efficiency rapidly declines and cowl drag increases from practical limitations. For higher Mach numbers, in order to maintain efficient compression while minimizing drag, the intake design can have part of the supersonic diffusion take place inside the duct, known as external/internal compression or mixed compression. In this case the cowl lip together with the internal ramp surface within the duct continues the supersonic diffusion with reflected oblique shocks until the final normal shock. The XB-70 Valkyrie's intake is an example of a mixed external/internal compression ramp design. While more efficient, mixed compression intakes run the risk of unstart (the internal shockwaves rapidly and violently expelled out the front of the duct) from flow disturbances such as engine surge causing significant changes in mass flow. It's for this reason that mixed external/internal compression for the Concorde was initially considered but eventually dropped. Similarly, early in the development of the B-1 Lancer its mixed compression intake was changed to an external one, technically safer but with a small compromise in cruise speed.

=== Alternative shapes ===
The intake ramp has its equivalent in the inlet cone for circular/axisymmetric intakes. Here, the cone can be similarly adjusted in flight to ensure that the oblique shocks are properly positioned for efficient pressure recovery; such designs can also have supersonic compression be either all external, or mixed external/internal with the SR-71 Blackbird intake being an example of the latter.

Due to the complexity and weight from the movable components of variable-geometry intake ramps, some supersonic aircraft designs have instead employed simpler fixed-geometry alternatives. Examples include the fixed pitot-type intakes with a single detached normal shock, as employed on the General Dynamics F-16 and McDonnell Douglas F/A-18. These intake designs are much lighter and less maintenance-intensive with acceptable performance at moderate supersonic speeds, at the expense of pressure recovery performance at higher Mach numbers.

Since then, advances in aerodynamics have enabled fixed-geometry intake designs to preserve the performance of variable-geometry intake ramps through careful shaping of the inlet geometries. These are used on modern aircraft which are designed with greater emphasis on durability and survivability (stealth). One example is the caret compression surface, used in the Lockheed Martin F-22 and Boeing F/A-18E/F inlets. Here, oblique shocks are generated by a pair of fixed-geometry oblique compression ramps, with a downstream bleed system to control shock position. Another example is the diverterless supersonic inlet used on the Lockheed Martin F-35 and Chengdu J-20, which uses a 3-D bumped compression surface acting in a similar manner as a fixed shock cone while also diverting the boundary layer.

== Intake gallery ==
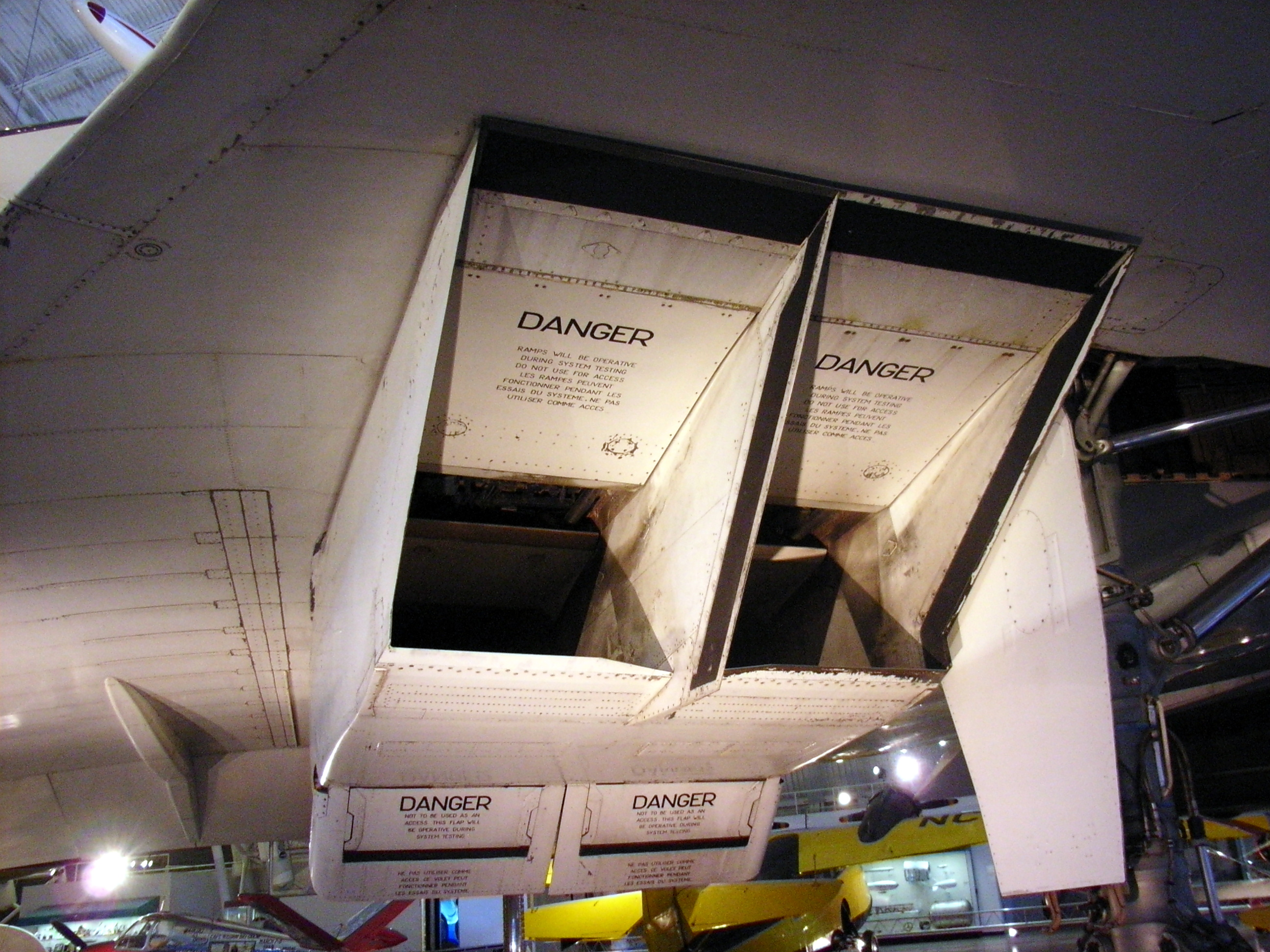
The ramps in two of the Concorde intakes are visible and clearly labelled as such.

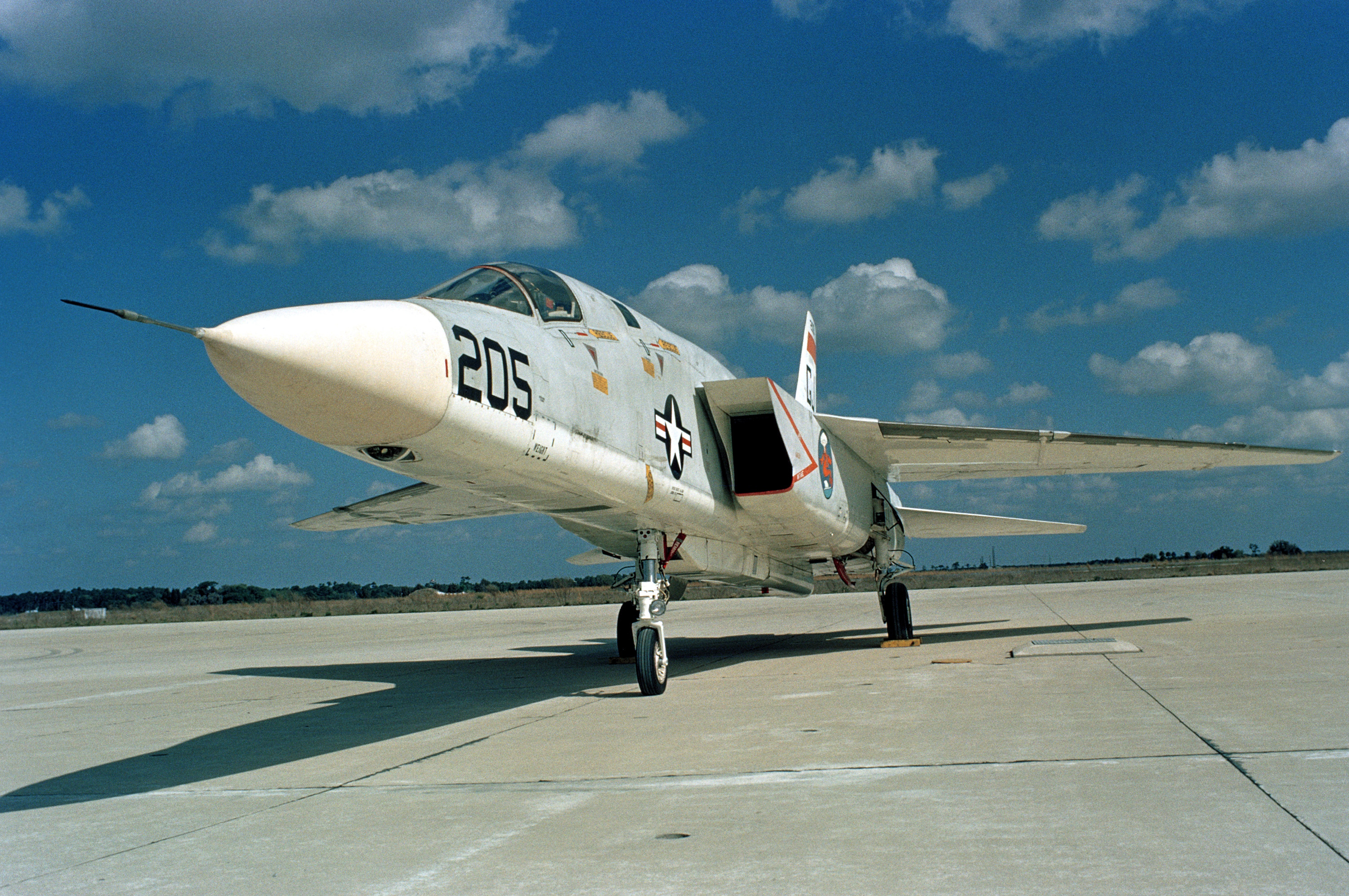
A-5 Vigilante with inlet ramps

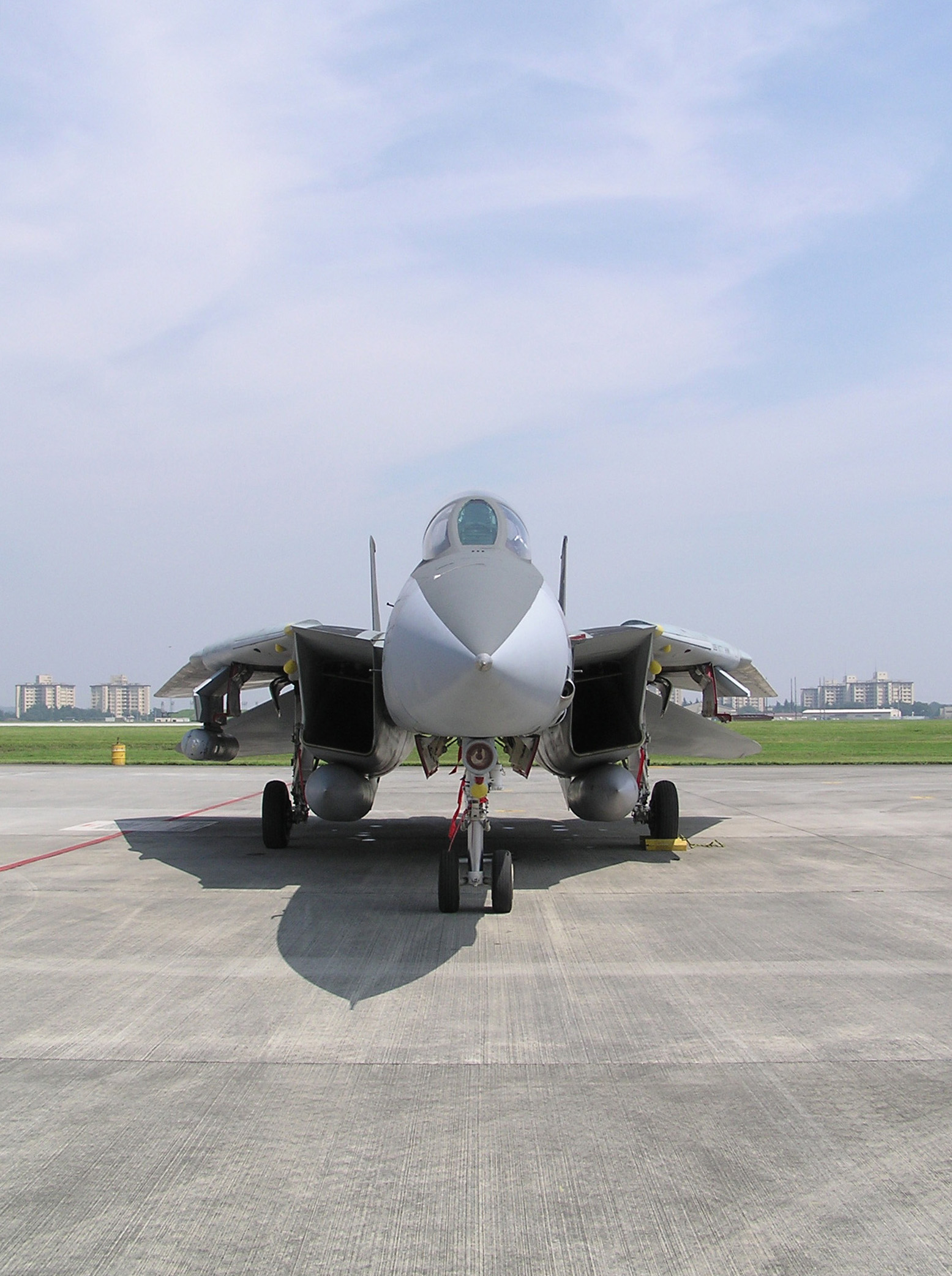
F-14 with internal ramps forming upper surface of intake duct

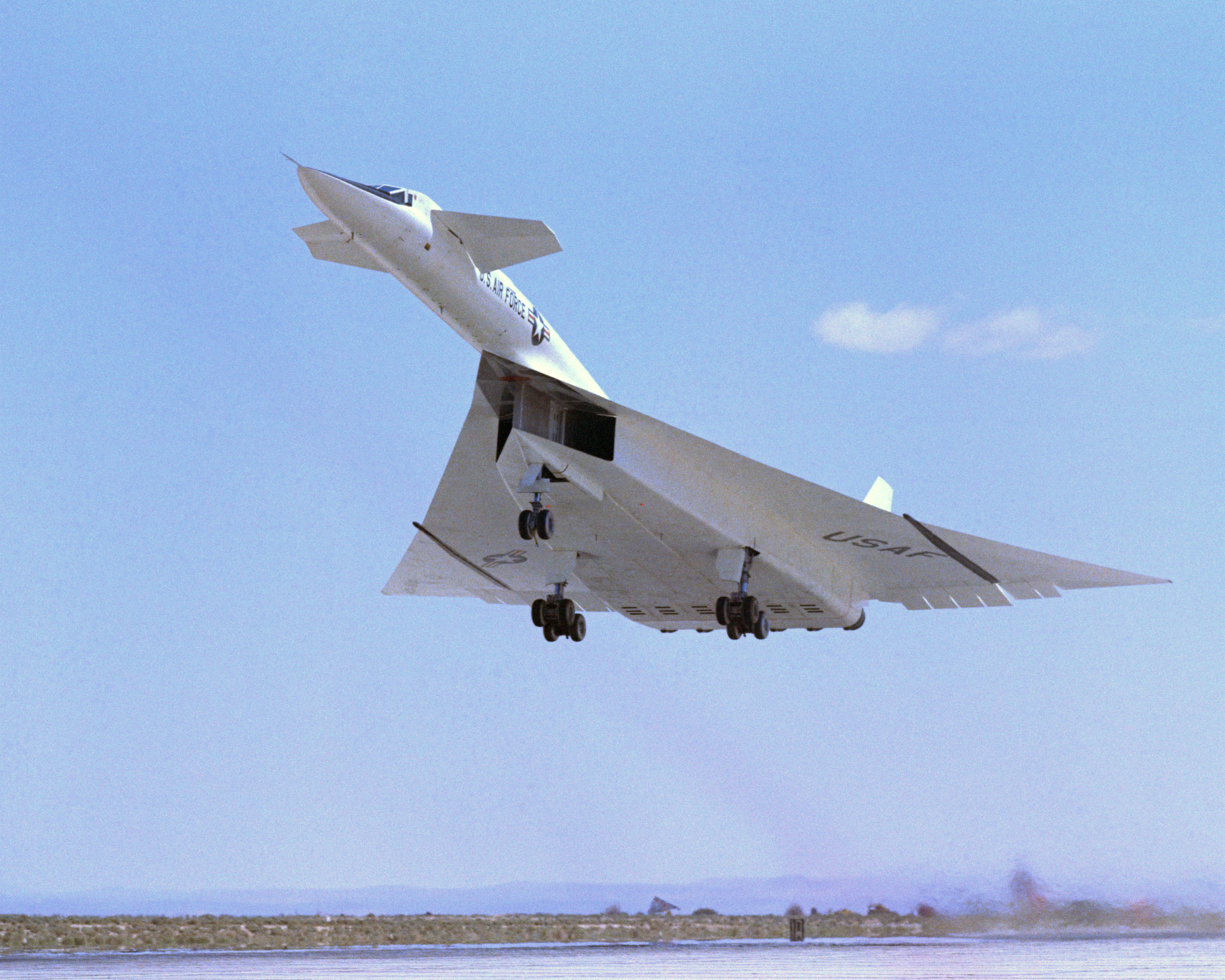
Vertical ramps on inboard surface of intake duct XB-70

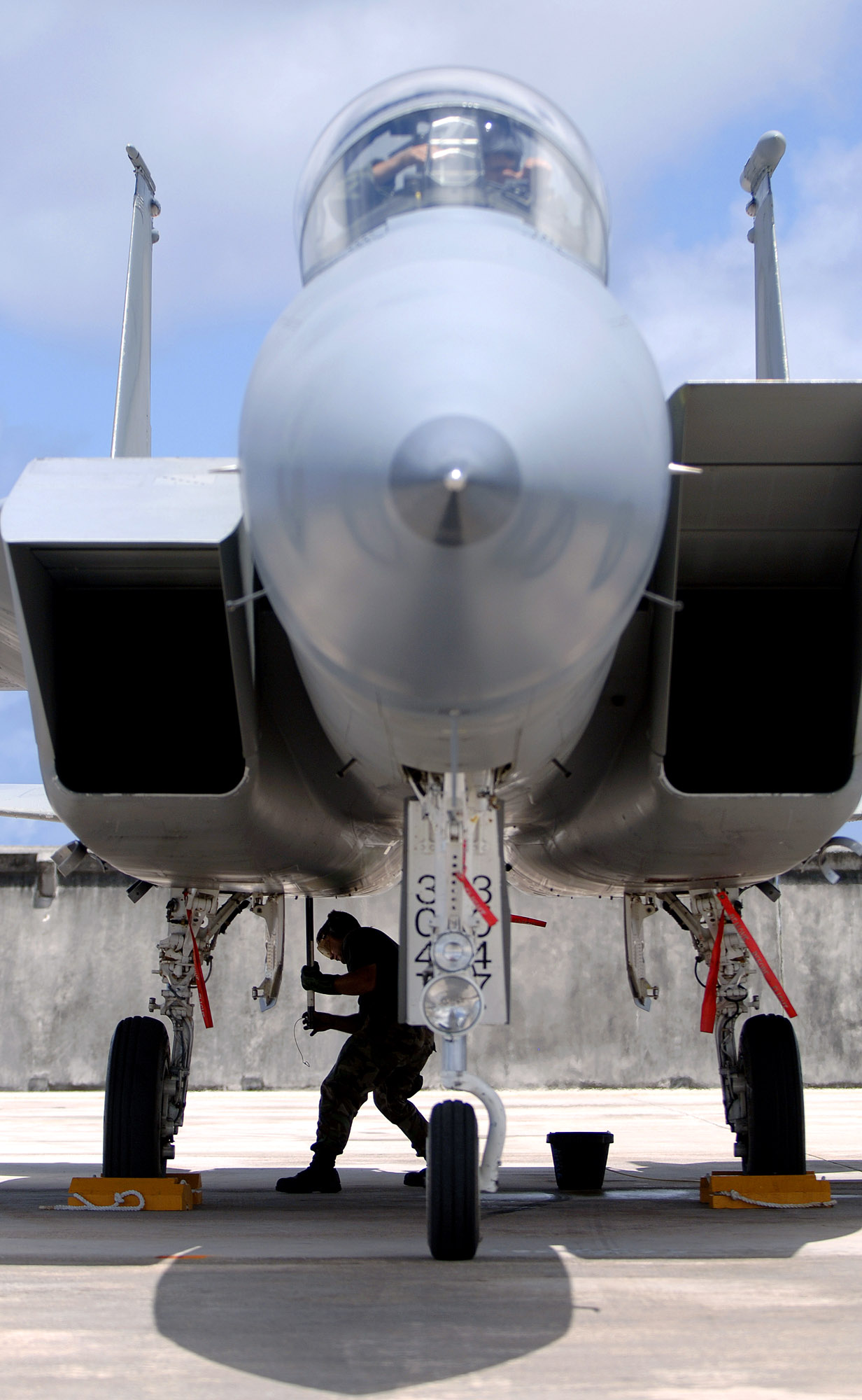
F-15 internal ramps form upper surface of intake duct behind the intake upper lips which are shown in different positions

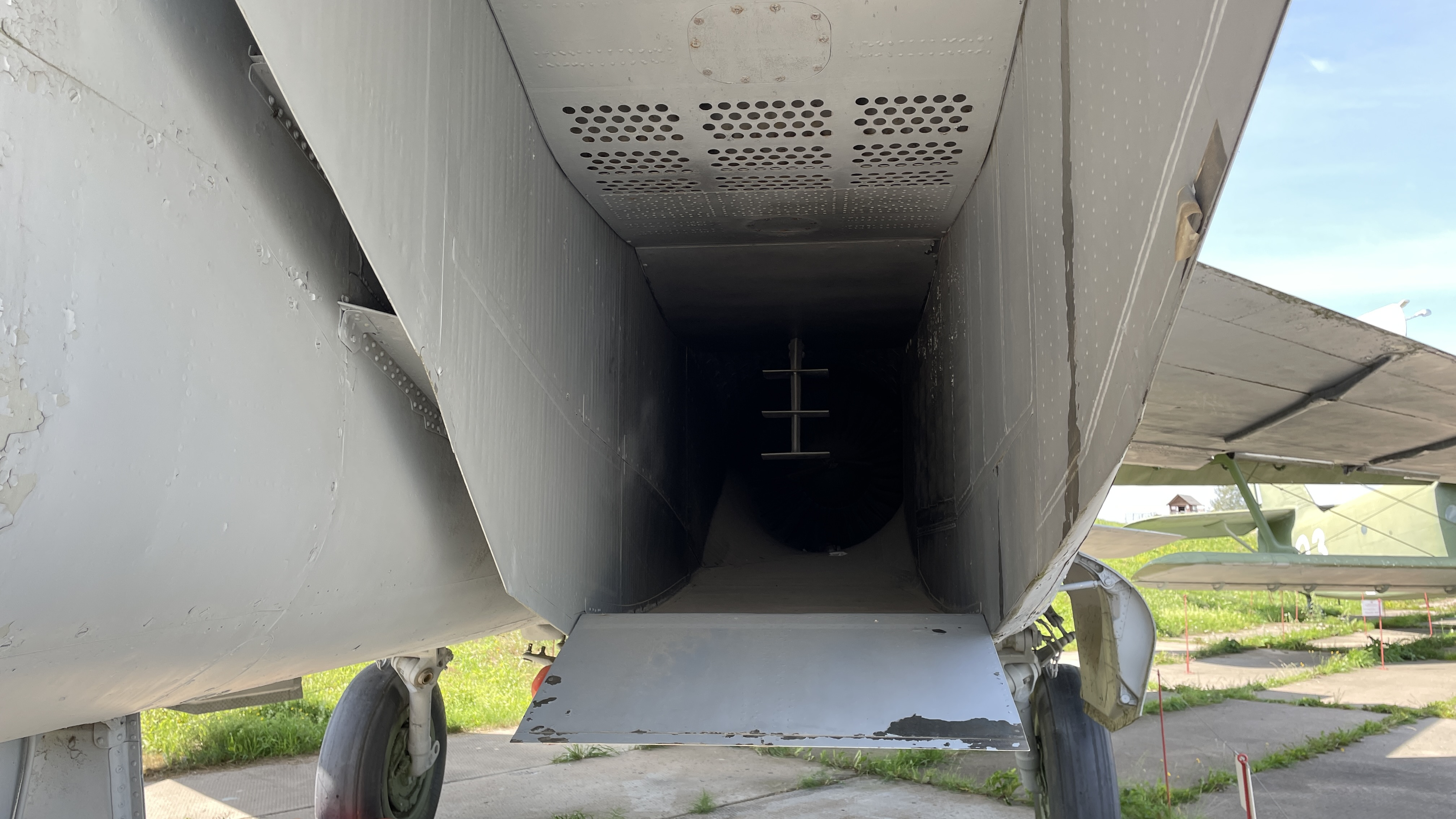
MiG-25 ramp

== See also ==
- Index of aviation articles
- Inlet cone
- NACA duct
- Splitter plate
