= JH-XX =

Chinese bomber development program

JH-XX is a designation applied by American intelligence agencies to describe programs by the People's Republic of China to develop a regional bomber/tactical bomber/fighter bomber. JH-XX is the second stealth bomber of China confirmed in existence by the U.S. intelligence community (after the Xian H-20), and the Pentagon speculates the fighter-bomber is capable of long-range strikes and nuclear weapons delivery.

On 26 December 2024, social media photos and videos suggested Chengdu Aircraft Corporation (CAC) has publicly flown a prototype aircraft in Chengdu, Sichuan, tentatively designated as the J-36 by military analysts. The aircraft was spotted flying around an airport owned by CAC and features a trijet tailless flying wing design. It was trailed by a Chengdu J-20S twin-seater stealth fighter as the chase plane. The aircraft was speculated as either a sixth-generation fighter prototype or the JH-XX stealth regional bomber. The United States Air Force General Kenneth Wilsbach has assessed that J-36 is a "6th generation" aircraft with an "air superiority" role.

== See also ==
- J-XX
- H-20
