= Skin (aeronautics) =

Outer surface which covers much of its wings and fuselage

The skin of an aircraft is the outer surface which covers much of its wings and fuselage. The most commonly used materials are aluminum and aluminium alloys with other metals, including zinc, magnesium and copper.

== Impact on fuel efficiency ==
Advances in aircraft skin materials can improve fuel efficiency by affecting an aircraft’s weight, aerodynamics, durability, and maintenance requirements. Aluminum-based alloys are cost-effective and easy to repair, though they are susceptible to corrosion and fatigue. Composite materials provide significant weight savings but generally have higher manufacturing and maintenance costs. Advances in hybrid materials promise to balance the benefits of metals and composites to balance performance and cost.

== See also ==
- Index of aviation articles
