= LFI =

LFI may refer to:

== Organizations ==
- La France Insoumise, a French political party
- Lycée Français d'Irlande, a French international school in Dublin, Ireland
- Labour Friends of Israel, a lobby group within the British Labour Party

== Other uses ==
- La Facción Ingobernable, a Mexican professional wrestling stable
- Limited Feedback Interaction, a recording technique used primarily in the creation of improvised music
- Local File Inclusion, a type of vulnerability most often found on websites
- Logkiy Frontovoi Istrebitel ("Light Frontline Fighter"), a fifth-generation Russian fighter aircraft project
- LFI, an IATA code for Langley Air Force Base in Virginia
