= Saturn AL-31 =

Family of turbofan engines used by the Soviet military

AL-31
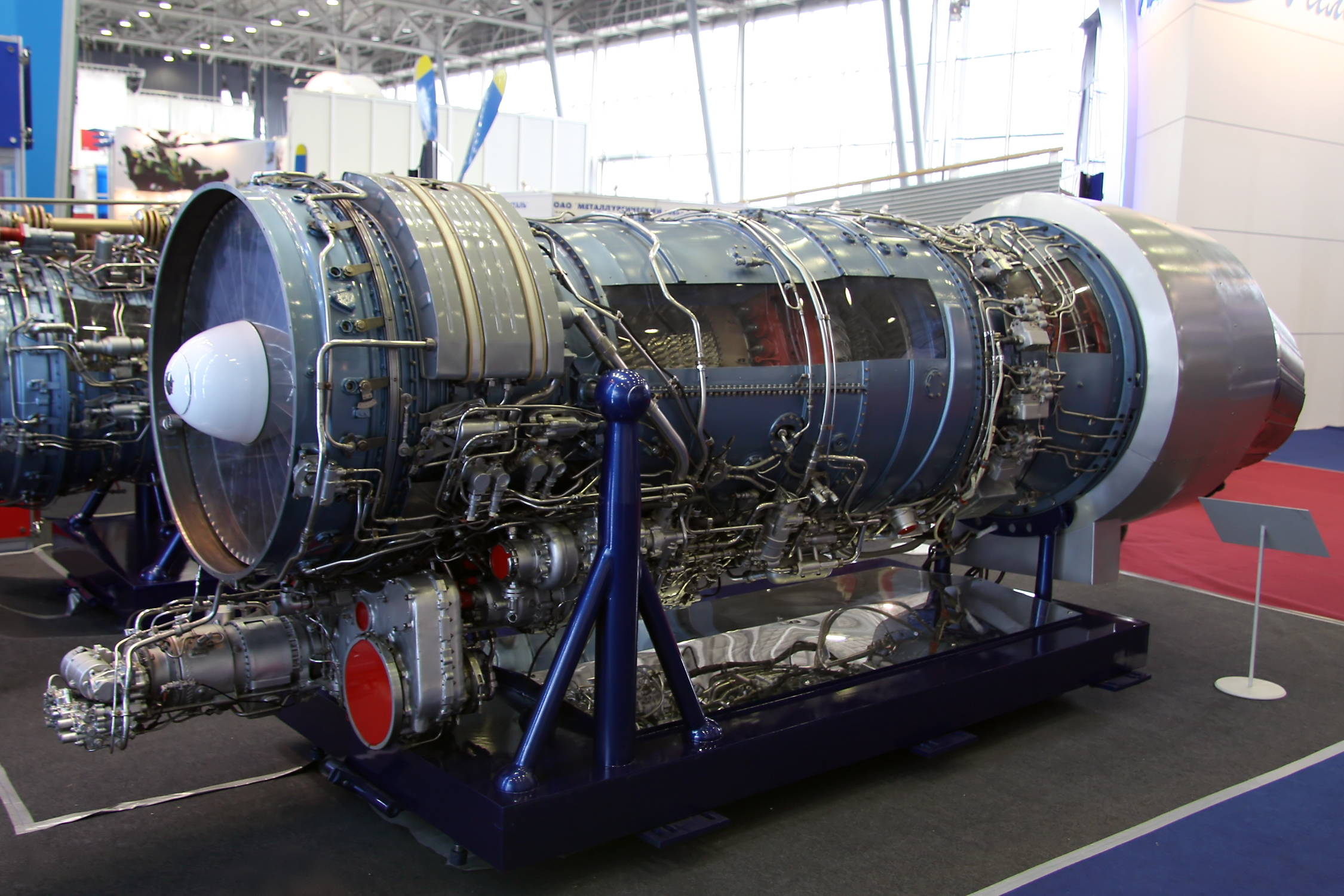
- Saturn AL-31FN turbofan engine
- Type: Turbofan
- National origin: USSR/Russia
- Manufacturer: Lyulka (now NPO Saturn), UMPO, NPC Salyut, HAL India
- Major applications: Chengdu J-10; Chengdu J-20; Sukhoi Su-27; Sukhoi Su-30MKI; Sukhoi Su-57; Shenyang J-11; Sukhoi S-70 Okhotnik-B

The Saturn AL-31 (originally Lyulka) is a family of axial flow turbofan engines, developed by the Lyulka-Saturn design bureau in the Soviet Union, now NPO Saturn in Russia, originally as a 12.5-tonne (122.6 kN, 27,560 lbf) powerplant for the Sukhoi Su-27 long range air superiority fighter. The AL-31 currently powers the Su-27 family of combat aircraft and some variants of the Chengdu J-10 multirole jet fighter. Assembly of the engine is also performed under license in India by HAL at its Engine Division Koraput, for the Sukhoi Su-30MKI. Improved variants power the fifth-generation Sukhoi Su-57 and Chengdu J-20.

== Development and design ==
The design of the AL-31 turbofan began in the 1970s under the designation izdeliye 99 (Note: The Russian term изделие, translit. izdeliye literally means "manufactured article" or "product".) by the Lyulka design bureau, also known as Lyulka-Saturn. With an emphasis on greater fuel efficiency over turbojets for longer range, the 12.5 tonnes-force (122.6 kN; 27,560 lbf) class turbofan engine was intended to power the heavy PFI (Russian: ПФИ, short for: перспективного фронтового истребителя, lit. 'Prospective Frontline Fighter'), which was being developed by Sukhoi as the T-10. The chief designer was Arkhip M. Lyulka, and after his death, Victor M. Chepkin. As the AL-31 was not yet ready for the first two T-10 prototypes in 1977, they were initially powered by modified AL-21F3 turbojet engines. The third prototype would be the first to install the AL-31. The T-10 design would be heavily revised into the T-10S, with T-10-7 being the first prototype of the improved design; the aircraft's aerodynamic refinements from changes in the outer shaping and packaging also resulted in the AL-31 gearbox changing to a top-mounted position. State tests of the AL-31 were completed in 1985, and the T-10 entering Soviet air services as the Su-27. The engine is manufactured at Ufa-based UMPO and Moscow-based Salyut.

After the collapse of the Soviet Union, design bureau and production plant distinctions realigned and gradually faded, and Lyulka-Saturn eventually merged with Rybinsk Motors to become NPO Saturn and was closely aligned with UMPO while Salyut became an independent entity; both Saturn and Salyut would make their own developments for the AL-31 family. Salyut also supplies AL-31 variants to fighters operated by China. The J-10 uses the AL-31FN before newer variants transitioned to the domestic WS-10A, while the J-20 uses the AL-31FM2 as an interim engine until its intended WS-15 is ready. This reorganization would result in serious disputes between Saturn and Salyut over intellectual property rights and royalties over AL-31 sales to China.

The AL-31 was also used to assist Chinese engine designer and manufacturer Shenyang/Liming in developing the WS-10, with early examples directly using the AL-31F control system. According to Saturn's Victor M. Chepkin, chief designer of the 117 and 117S engines, the WS-10 was developed with the aid of the AL-31's maintenance technical documentation; this was recently confirmed by Aviation Industry Corporation of China (AVIC), the parent of Shenyang Aircraft Corporation.

=== Design ===
The base model AL-31F is a two-shaft axial-flow afterburning turbofan. The engine has a four-stage low-pressure compressor and a nine-stage high-pressure compressor, both driven by single stage turbines. Overall pressure ratio is 23, and the turbine inlet temperature is 1,392 °C (1,665 K; 2,538 °F); the turbine blades incorporate air film cooling. The engine is controlled by the analogue KRD-99 unit, and can tolerate severely distorted air flow from the intake. It produces 7.8 tonnes-force (76.49 kN; 17,200 lbf) of thrust dry and 12.5 tonnes-force (122.6 kN; 27,560 lbf) of thrust in afterburner. The AL-31 has a modular design to facilitate maintenance and overhaul. In the twin-engine Su-27, left and right engines are interchangeable. Initially, the Mean Time Between Overhaul (MTBO) of the engine was only 100 hours, short of the required 300 hours. Later series incrementally improved the MTBO figure to 500 hours while service life was assigned as 1,500 hours. Further improved variants, such as the AL-31F Series 42, increased the MTBO to 1,000 hours with a full-life of 2,000 hours.

== Further developments ==
=== Thrust vectoring ===
The AL-37FU and AL-31FP variants have thrust vectoring. The AL-37FU was an experimental thrust vectoring variant for a modified Su-27M, later designated Su-37, and was uprated to 14.5 tonnes-force (142.2 kN; 31,970 lbf) of thrust. The thrust vectoring nozzles could deflect ±15° in the vertical plane together for pitch or differentially for roll. After the engines reached the end of their service lives, the sole Su-37 was equipped with the normal AL-31F until it crashed in December 2002.

The research on thrust vectoring would be applied to the production AL-31FP used in the Sukhoi/Irkut Su-30MKI for India as well as further derivatives including the Su-30MKM for Malaysia and the Su-30SM for the Russian Air Force and Navy. The AL-31FP has the same thrust of 12.5 tonnes-force (122.6 kN; 27,560 lbf) as the baseline AL-31F, but can deflect its nozzle to a maximum of ±15° at a rate of 30°/sec. The vectoring nozzle is used primarily in the pitch plane, but unlike the AL-37FU, the canting of the vectoring axes allow differential vectoring to produce roll and yaw moments as well. The AL-31FP nozzle has a time before overhaul of 500 hours, while the engine's MTBO is 1,000 hours, and both have a service life of 2,000 hours. AL-31FP is built by UMPO as well as in India by Hindustan Aeronautics Limited (HAL) at the Koraput facility under a deep technology transfer agreement.

=== Salyut developments ===
==== AL-31FN ====
The AL-31FN variant was developed by Salyut to power the Chengdu J-10, with key differences including slightly more thrust of 12.7 tonnes-force (124.54 kN; 27,999 lbf) and gearbox relocated from the top to the bottom of the engine. Later J-10 variants and production lots were equipped with the improved AL-31FN series 3, with thrust increased to 13.7 tonnes-force (134.35 kN; 30,203 lbf) and service life raised by 250 hours. Further production J-10 batches would eventually be equipped with the Shenyang/Liming WS-10A in lieu of the AL-31FN.

During the 2024 Zhuhai Air Show, Rostec introduced the Series 5 upgrade of the AL-31FN, having a theoretical thrust of 14 tonnes-force (137.29 kN; 30,865 lbf) and a 6% enhancement in fuel consumption.

==== AL-31FM1, FM2, and FM3 ====
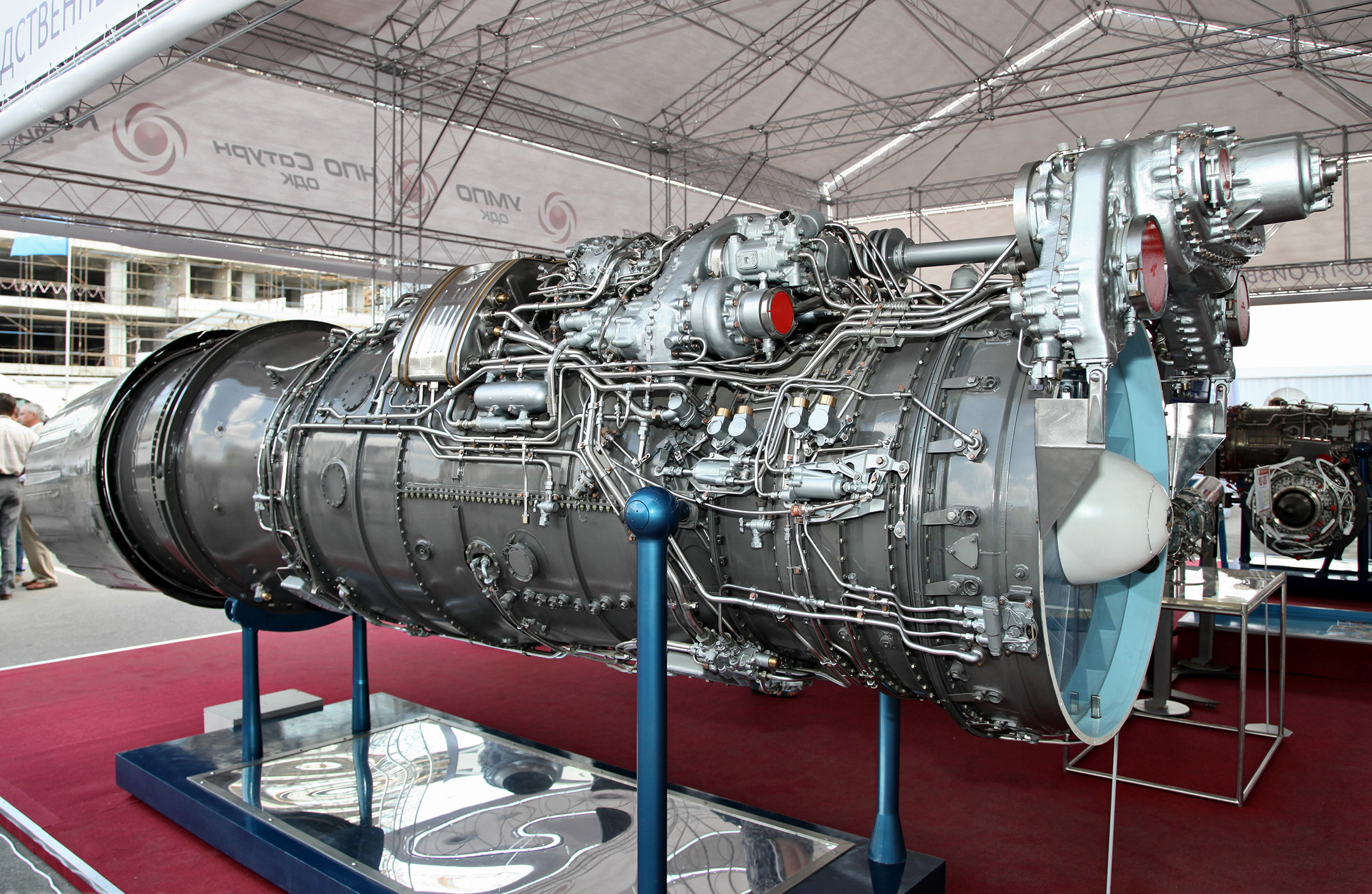
AL-31F series 42 (AL-31FM1) at Russian Defense Ministry Innovation Day 2013

Salyut also developed additional improved variants of the AL-31F with increased thrust and reliability. The first is the AL-31FM1, also designated as the AL-31F series 42, which had a larger KND-924-4 fan, with inlet diameter increasing from 905 mm (35.6 in) on the baseline AL-31 to 924 mm (36.4 in) which increased airflow by 6%. Additional enhancements include an improved core for greater turbine inlet temperature, and improved engine control system. The engine also had improved MTBO of 1,000 hours, projected life of 2,000 hours, and its thrust was increased to 13.5 tonnes-force (132.4 kN; 29,760 lbf); this engine passed Russian state acceptance testing in 2006 and was equipped on the Su-27SM, Su-30M2, and Su-34.

The AL-31FM2 is a further development of the AL-31FM1. Fan aerodynamics was further refined to increase its pressure ratio. The engine also incorporated improvements to the combustor and turbine blade aerodynamics and cooling for higher entry temperatures. The AL-31FM2 has a new full authority digital engine control (FADEC) with a hydromechanical backup. Thrust was increased 9% across the envelope, with a maximum thrust of 14.5 tonnes-force (142.2 kN; 31,970 lbf) in afterburner. The engine has an MTBO of 1,000 hours and projected life increased to 3,000 hours. A version of the AL-31FM2 powers initial production batches of the Chengdu J-20 while later batches transitioned to the WS-10C; both of these engines are interim powerplants in place of the J-20's intended Xian WS-15.

The last in this line is the proposed AL-31FM3, which would have a new 3-stage fan, designated KND-924-3, with further increased pressure ratio and additional core improvements to increase turbine inlet temperature by 150 °C. Maximum thrust was increased to 15 tonnes-force (147.1 kN; 33,070 lbf) in afterburner. The AL-31FM3 had been proposed as a potential powerplant for Sukhoi's T-50 PAK FA design but this was not pursued by Sukhoi, which instead chose Salyut rival NPO Saturn and its AL-41F1.

Salyut's developments of the AL-31 would result in serious disputes with Lyulka-Saturn's successor corporation NPO Saturn, which considers them unsanctioned and in violation of intellectual property rights.

=== Saturn developments ===
==== AL-41F-1 (izdeliye 117) ====
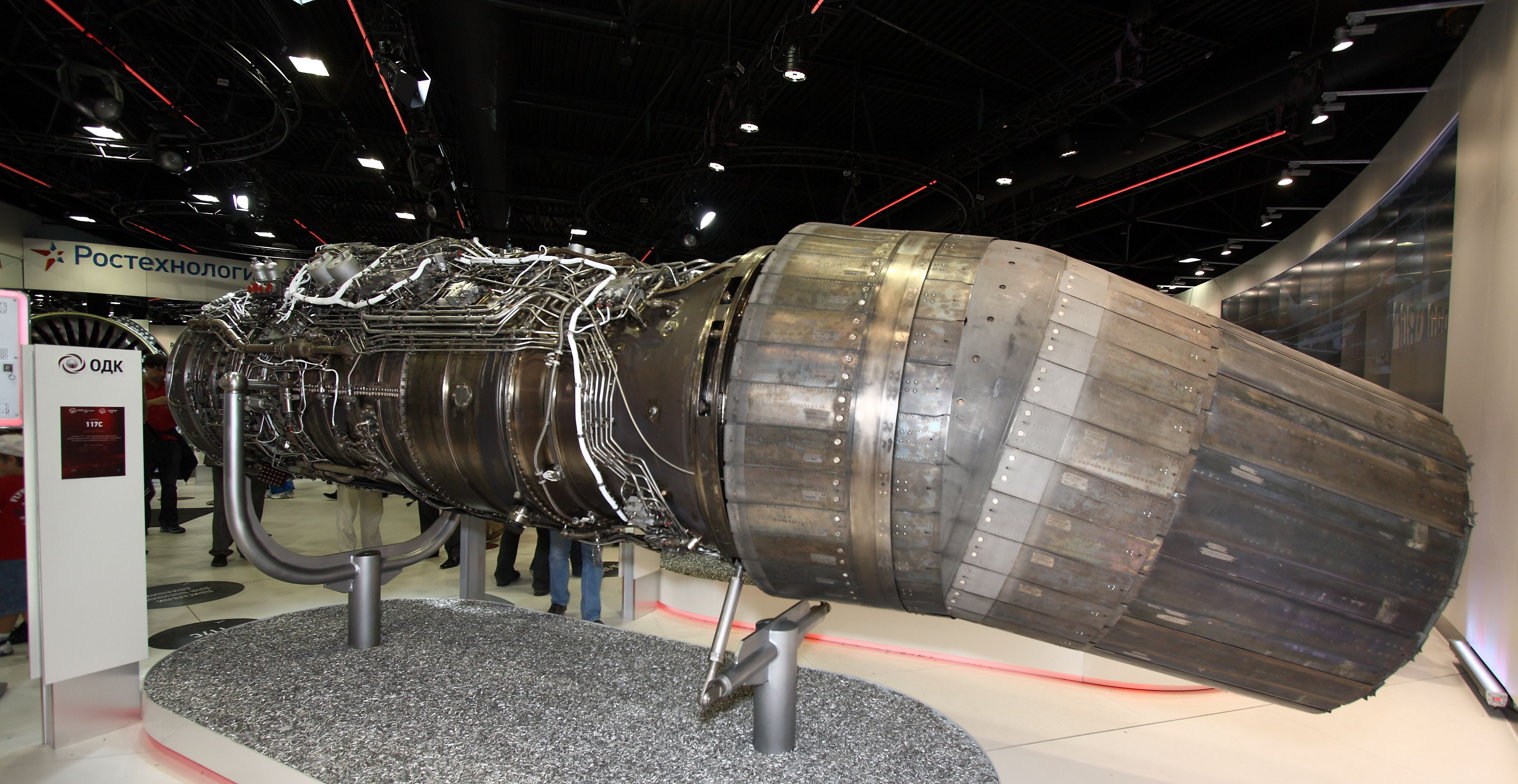
AL-41F1 for fifth generation Sukhoi PAK FA (The international aerospace salon MAKS-2011)

Due to the decline of the Mikoyan Project 1.42/1.44 MFI fifth-generation fighter program in the 1990s, the Russian Defence Ministry initiated the PAK FA program for a more affordable next-generation multirole fighter, with the competition announced in 2001. As the designs would be smaller than the MFI, the original Lyulka-Saturn AL-41F design for the MiG 1.42/1.44 was too large. Instead, a deeply improved AL-31F derivative from Lyulka-Saturn (later NPO Saturn) designated the izdeliye 117 was contracted by Sukhoi for its T-50 design, which would eventually win the competition in 2002 and enter service in 2020 as the Su-57. First proposed by Saturn in 2001, the izdeliye 117, or AL-41F1, formally began development in April 2004 with contract signing by NPO Saturn.

While the AL-41F1 has the same overall architecture as the baseline AL-31, with a 4-stage low-pressure compressor (fan) and 9-stage high-pressure compressor and one-stage low pressure and one-stage high pressure turbines, the engine was deeply improved with up to 80% new parts and application of technology from the AL-41F. It has increased fan diameter of 932 millimetres (36.7 in), new high- and low-pressure turbines, provisions for thrust-vectoring nozzles similar to the AL-31FP, and a digital control system (FADEC) integrated into the aircraft's flight control system. Though the specifics remain classified, the AL-41F1's thrust was increased by 2.5 tonnes-force (24.5 kN; 5,510 lbf) over the AL-31 while the engine weight growth was reduced by 150 kg (330 lb). The engine produces 9 tonnes-force (88.26 kN; 19,840 lbf) of thrust dry, 14.5 tonnes-force (142.2 kN; 31,970 lbf) in afterburner, and 15 tonnes-force (147.1 kN; 33,070 lbf) in an emergency, with a dry weight of approximately 1,600 kg (3,527 lb). (Note: Early statements about the AL-41F1 indicated a thrust-to-weight ratio of 10.5:1, but newer sources on the engine's characteristics resulted in a figure of 9.3:1) The engine enables the Su-57 to achieve supersonic speed without afterburner, or supercruise, at Mach 1.3.

Following completion of state tests to meet Russian Air Force requirements, serial production of the AL-41F1 began in 2019 for installation in production Su-57 fighters supplied to the Russian Air Force and prospective foreign clients. A non-afterburning version of the AL-41F1 powers the Sukhoi S-70 Okhotnik unmanned combat aerial vehicle (UCAV). While the current Su-57 production tranches are powered by the AL-41F1, the aircraft is to be the basis for a family of stealth combat aircraft; future improved variants are planned to be powered by the Saturn izdeliye 30, later designated AL-51F-1, a new design that fits into the same footprint as the AL-41F1.

==== AL-41F-1S (izdeliye 117S) ====
To spread out development risks and associated costs with the fifth-generation PAK FA program, Sukhoi applied some of the technology, including the propulsion system, into a highly upgraded Su-27 variant, designated T-10BM (popularly called the Su-35BM), before being designated just as the Su-35. The aircraft's powerplant, the NPO Saturn izdeliye 117S, or AL-41F1S, is a slightly simplified derivative of the AL-41F1 from the Su-57, with the key difference being the separate engine control system of the AL-41F1S. The Su-35 and its AL-41F1S engines were originally developed by Sukhoi and Saturn internally for export, although the initial customer would be the Russia Defence Ministry. The engine produces 8.8 tonnes-force (86.30 kN; 19,400 lbf) of thrust dry, 14 tonnes-force (137.3 kN; 30,860 lbf) in afterburner, and 14.5 tonnes-force (142.2 kN; 31,970 lbf) in an emergency. The AL-41F1S fan diameter was increased by 3% over the baseline AL-31, from 905 mm (35.6 in) to 932 mm (36.7 in), and also has increased turbine inlet temperature. This engine weighs 1,604 kg (3,536 lb) dry and has an assigned life of 4,000 hours and an MTBO of 1,000 to 1,500 hours. The first flight of this engine was completed in an Su-35BM on 20 February 2008. On 9 August 2010, UMPO started supplying AL-41F1S intended for Su-35S fighters. The engine is also equipped on the Su-30SM2 as part of the upgrade plan to unify its systems with the Su-35S.

== Variants ==
Name	Description	Builder	Year	Thrust	Thrust vectoring	Aircraft	Status
AL-31F	The basic engine developed to power the Su-27 fighter	Salyut, UMPO	1981	27,560 lbf (122.6 kN)	No	Sukhoi Su-27, Shenyang J-11, Sukhoi Su-30MKK, Sukhoi Su-30 (Salyut)	In service/production
AL-31F3	Improved variant for the naval version Su-33	Saturn Lyulka		28,230 lbf (125.57 kN)	No	Sukhoi Su-33	In service
AL-31FP	Improved variant for the Indian Su-30MKI with thrust vectoring	Salyut, HAL	2000	27,560 lbf (122.6 kN)	Yes	Sukhoi Su-30 MKI, Sukhoi Su-30MKM, Su-30MKA, Sukhoi Su-30SM	In service/production
AL-31FN	Improved variant for the Chengdu J-10	Salyut	2002	27,998 lbf (124.54 kN)	No	Chengdu J-10	In service
AL-31FN Series 3	Improved variant for the Chengdu J-10B	Salyut	2013	30,203 lbf (134.35 kN)	No	Chengdu J-10	In service/production
AL-31FN Series 5	Improved variant offered for Chengdu J-10B	Salyut	2024	30,864 lbf (137.29 kN)	No	Chengdu J-10	Proposed and offered to the J-10
AL-31FM1 (Series 42)	Improved version for the Russian Air Force	Salyut	2007	29,760 lbf (132.4 kN)	Yes (Optional)	Sukhoi Su-27SM, Sukhoi Su-30, Sukhoi Su-34	In service/production
AL-31FM2	Improved version for the Chengdu J-20	Salyut	2012	31,970 lbf (142.2 kN)	No	Chengdu J-20	In service/production
AL-37FU	Advanced derivative for the Su-37	UMPO		31,970 lbf (142.2 kN)	Yes	Sukhoi Su-37	Experimental derivative for the Su-37
AL-41F-1S (117S)	Advanced derivative for the Su-35	UMPO	2008	31,970 lbf (142.2 kN)	Yes	Sukhoi Su-35, Sukhoi Su-30SM2	In service/production
AL-41F1 (117)	Advanced derivative for the Sukhoi Su-57	UMPO	2010	33,070 lbf (147.1 kN)	Yes	Sukhoi Su-57, Sukhoi S-70	In service/production

== Specifications ==
=== AL-31F ===
Data from Gordon, Rosoboronexport, United Engine Corporation, UMPO, Salyut

==== General characteristics ====
- Type: Two-shaft axial-flow afterburning turbofan
- Length: 4,945 mm (194.7 in)
- Diameter:
  - 905 mm (35.6 in) inlet;
  - 1,280 mm (50 in) maximum external
- Dry weight: 1,520 kg (3,350 lb)

==== Components ====
- Compressor: 4-stage low pressure compressor (fan) and 9-stage high pressure compressor
- Combustors: Annular
- Turbine: 1-staged low pressure, 1-stage high pressure turbines
- Nozzle: 2-dimensional vectoring

==== Performance ====
- Maximum thrust:
  - 7.8 tf (76.49 kN; 17,200 lbf) dry thrust
  - 12.5 tf (122.6 kN; 27,560 lbf) with afterburner
- Overall pressure ratio: 23:1
- Bypass ratio: 0.56:1
- Air mass flow: 112 kg/s (247 lb/s)
- Turbine inlet temperature: 1,665 K (2,537 °F; 1,392 °C)
- Specific fuel consumption:
  - Dry thrust: 22.1 g/kN/s (0.78 lb/lbf/h)
  - With afterburner: 55.5 g/kN/s (1.96 lb/lbf/h)
- Thrust-to-weight ratio: 4.93 (dry), 8.22 (afterburning)

=== AL-41F-1S (117S) ===
Data from Rosoboronexport

==== General characteristics ====
- Type: Two-shaft axial-flow afterburning turbofan
- Length: 494.2 cm (194.6 in)
- Diameter: 93.2 cm (36.7 in) inlet
- Dry weight: 1,604 kg (3,536 lb)

==== Components ====
- Compressor: 4-stage low pressure compressor (fan), 9-stage high pressure compressor
- Combustors: Annular
- Turbine: 1-stage low pressure, 1-stage high pressure turbines
- Nozzle: 2-dimensional vectoring

==== Performance ====
- Maximum thrust:
  - 8.8 tf (86.30 kN; 19,400 lbf) dry thrust
  - 14 tf (137.3 kN; 30,860 lbf) with afterburner
  - 14.5 tf (142.2 kN; 31,970 lbf) emergency thrust
- Turbine inlet temperature: 1,745 K (2,681 °F; 1,472 °C),
- Fuel consumption:
  - 6,813 kg/h (15,020 lb/h) dry
  - 24,969 kg/h (55,050 lb/h) with afterburner
- Specific fuel consumption:
  - 22.37 g/kN/s (0.790 lb/lbf/h) dry
  - 51.53 g/kN/s (1.819 lb/lbf/h) with afterburner
- Thrust-to-weight ratio: 5.49 (dry), 8.75 with afterburner, 9.04 with emergency thrust

== See also ==
Comparable engines

- General Electric F110
- Pratt & Whitney F100
- Klimov RD-33
- Shenyang WS-10
- Soloviev D-30

Related lists

- List of aircraft engines
