= Mikoyan LMFS =

Proposed 5th-generation Russian aircraft

General information
- Type: Stealth light multirole fighter
- Manufacturer: Mikoyan
- Status: Cancelled
- Primary user: Russian Air Force (intended)

History
- Developed from: Mikoyan Project 1.44

The Mikoyan LMFS (Russian: Микоян ЛМФС) Liogkiy Mnogofunktsionalniy Frontovoi Samolyet (LMFS)—or Light Multi-Function Frontline Aircraft, also known as the MiG-XX, was a proposed light Russian single-seat all-weather stealth multirole combat aircraft. The design is derived from the company's PAK FA proposal, which was rejected in favor of Sukhoi's, along with lessons learned from the cancelled Mikoyan MiG-1.42/1.44. It was supposed to replace the Mikoyan MiG-29 and MiG-35 and be a more affordable complement to the PAK FA, which became the Sukhoi Su-57. However, by 2021, the project was no longer under development, while Sukhoi unveiled its own LTS medium-weight single-engine stealth fifth-generation fighter.

== Background ==
In the 1990s, the end of the Cold War and the collapse of the Soviet Union resulted in severe disruptions in funding for Russia's MFI (Russian: МФИ, short for: Многофункциональный фронтовой истребитель, romanized: Mnogofunksionalni Frontovoy Istrebitel, lit. 'Multifunctional Frontline Fighter') fifth-generation fighter programme, which was being developed as the Mikoyan Project 1.42/1.44. Owing to high costs, the MFI was cancelled and a new programme for a more affordable multirole fifth-generation fighter, the PAK FA (Russian: ПАК ФА, short for: Перспективный авиационный комплекс фронтовой авиации, romanized: Perspektivnyy Aviatsionnyy Kompleks Frontovoy Aviatsii, lit. ''prospective aeronautical complex of front-line air forces''), was initiated in April 2001 to replace the MiG-29 and Su-27. Mikoyan and Sukhoi submitted proposals, and the two companies differed in their design approach; Mikoyan's E-721 proposal was smaller at a normal takeoff weight of 16–17 tonnes (35,000–37,000 lb) and powered by a pair of 10–11 tonne (98.1–108 kN, 22,000–24,300 lbf) thrust Klimov VK-10M engines, while Sukhoi's T-50 would be comparatively larger and more capable, with normal takeoff weight goal of 22–23 tonnes (49,000–51,000 lb) and powered by a pair of 14.5-tonne (142 kN, 32,000 lbf) thrust Lyulka-Saturn AL-41F1 engines. The Russian Defence Ministry selected Sukhoi's proposal in April 2002. Despite not being selected, Mikoyan continued to develop its own proposal as the LMFS (Russian: ЛМФС, short for: Легкий многофункциональный фронтовой самолёт, romanized: Liogkiy Mnogofunktsionalniy Frontovoi Samolyet, lit. 'Light Multifunctional Frontline Aircraft') with its own funds.

== Design ==
The aircraft was developed from Mikoyan's E-721. Developed by the United Aircraft Corporation (OAK), this light fighter was believed to incorporate an 11-ton thrust VK-10M engine based on the RD-33MK-35 engine used by the MiG-35. This new updated engine would be manufactured at the Klimov factory. The engine is supposed to be fifth generation, utilizing the latest advancements in turbine and combustion chamber technology, and receiving only minor changes to the fan blades. The aircraft could have canard wings, internal weapons bays and an empty weight of roughly 33,000 lbs and a maximum takeoff weight of 55,000 lbs. It was possible that Mikoyan may revise the design into a single-engine configuration by using the Sukhoi Su-57's next-generation izdeliye 30 engines, even though the latest wind tunnel mock up of the plane shows a twin-engine aircraft .

== Development ==
United Aircraft Corporation was developing the MiG LMFS out of its own funds, the Russian MoD preferring to wait for the Su-57 to enter serial production before starting to finance the construction of another smaller stealth fighter. Indeed, Alexei Fedorov, President of Irkut, said that any decision on applying fifth-generation technologies to produce a smaller fighter, such as the MiG LMFS, must wait until after the heavy fighter Sukhoi Su-57 enters full production, which is due to happen in 2020. Since the MiG LMFS is not included in the Russia's state armament programme 2020–2027, UAC hoped that the export sales of MiG-35 and MiG-29 would be enough to help sustain the development of a new aircraft.

In 2018, it was reported that, with the US decision not to export F-35 stealth fighters to Turkey anymore, Turkish authorities might decide to acquire instead the Russian Su-57 with Russia possibly sharing some of its technology to Turkey. If this happens, according to defence journalists, Turkey would perhaps in exchange share some of its TAI TF-X stealth light fighter technology to MiG, which might be used to help advance the development of the LMFS; the funds of a foreign co-investor being beneficial.

On April 16, 2020, after a long hiatus, United Aircraft Corporation announced on Twitter that MiG had restarted their research on a light fifth-generation stealth jet fighter. This new fighter is likely to support the Su-57 during missions. At the end of 2019, MiG placed an order for the aerodynamic calculation of a light multi-functional front-line twin-engine aircraft, comparable with foreign analogues, for the period 2020–25. The cost of work is estimated at 4 million rubles. The CEO of MiG, as well as Alexander Vatagin, the general manager of the engine manufacturer Klimov, have said that the engines of this new MiG jet would be more powerful than those of the Mikoyan MiG-35.

On December 20, 2020, the Head of the Rostec State Corporation (which owns both Mikoyan and Sukhoi) has announced that they were currently working ″to develop a combat aviation system of the future in its light and medium classes.″ He also stated that the company is currently working on the concept and the operational requirements of the plane, and that Rostec is doing this on their own initiative so far, without state budget funds. This advanced fifth-generation fighter is stated to be single-engine, with the option of being either crewed or uncrewed. That new aircraft, dubbed Sukhoi LTS "Checkmate", was later learned to be a new platform manufactured by Sukhoi with the support of Mikoyan and was unveiled at the MAKS 2021 Air Show.

In July 2021, it was revealed that the MiG LMFS was not in development anymore, but that a new medium-weight single-engine stealth fifth-generation fighter, known as Sukhoi Su-75 Checkmate, and based on years of research on the MiG LMFS and encompassing a lot of technologies from the Sukhoi Su-57, was in development. It was unveiled at the MAKS 2021 Air Show.

== Specifications (estimated) ==
Note: Since the LMFS never went beyond the design stage, most specifications are estimated.

Data from Key Aero

General characteristics

- Crew: 1
- Length: 15.5 m (50 ft 10 in)
- Wingspan: 11.5 m (37 ft 9 in)
- Gross weight: 17,000 kg (37,479 lb)
- Max takeoff weight: 24,500 kg (54,013 lb)
- Powerplant: 2 × Klimov VK-10M afterburning turbofan, 107.9 kN (24,300 lbf) with afterburner

Performance

- Maximum speed: Mach 1.8—2 (1,920—2,135 km/h; 1,190—1,327 mph) at altitude
  - Mach 1.15—1.2 (1,400—1,500 km/h; 870—930 mph) at sea level
- Range: 4,000 km (2,500 mi, 2,200 nmi) ferry range
- Service ceiling: 17,000 m (56,000 ft)
- g limits: +9.0
- Thrust/weight: 1.29 at normal takeoff weight

Armament

- 1,500 kg (3,300 lb) internal payload

Avionics

- Zhuk-AME AESA radar

== See also ==
Related development

- Sukhoi Su-75 Checkmate
- Mikoyan Project 1.44

Aircraft of comparable role, configuration, and era

- Lockheed Martin F-35 Lightning II
- Shenyang FC-31
- KAI KF-21 Boramae
- TAI TFX
- HAL AMCA
- Mitsubishi X-2 Shinshin

Related lists

- List of fighter aircraft
- List of military aircraft of the Soviet Union and the CIS
