= Supercruise =

Sustained supersonic flight of a supersonic aircraft

Supercruise is sustained supersonic flight of a supersonic aircraft without using an afterburner. Many supersonic military aircraft are not capable of supercruise and can maintain Mach 1+ flight only in short bursts with afterburners. Aircraft such as the SR-71 Blackbird are designed to cruise at supersonic speed with afterburners enabled.

Some fighter jets are capable of supercruise but only at high altitudes and in a clean configuration, so the term may imply "a significant increase in effective combat speed with a full weapons load over existing types". One of the pre-eminent military examples of supercruise is the F-22 Raptor, for which supercruise was defined as "the ability to cruise at speeds of one and a half times the speed of sound or greater without the use of afterburner for extended periods in combat configuration."

One of the best-known examples of an aircraft capable of supercruise, and the only notable non-military example, was Concorde. Due to its long service as a commercial airliner, Concorde holds the record for the most time spent supersonic; more than all other western aircraft combined.

== History ==
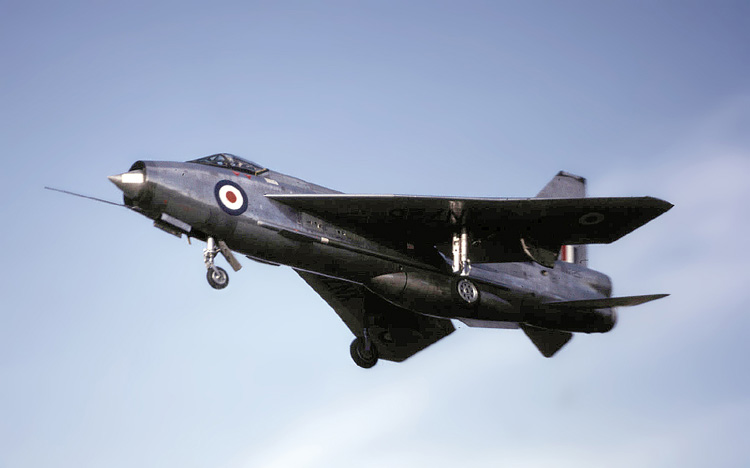
The English Electric Lightning was one of the first aircraft to exceed the speed of sound in level flight without using afterburning.

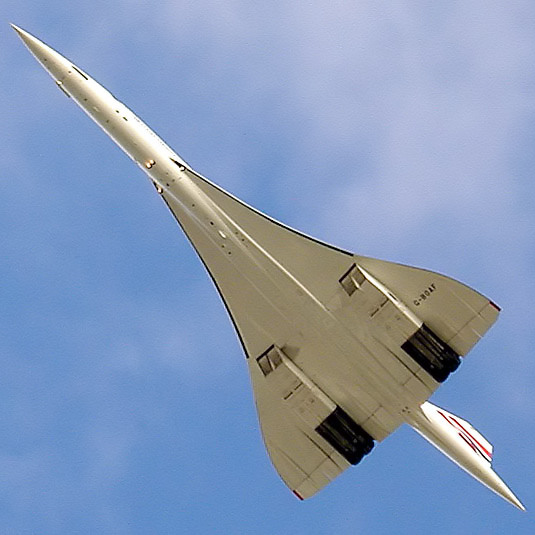
Concorde routinely supercruised most of the way over the Atlantic, enabling it to travel from London and Paris to New York in just over three hours, a record which has yet to be surpassed by any other commercial aircraft.

A few early supersonic aircraft attained speeds just beyond the speed of sound without using afterburning.

On 3 August 1954, a Gerfaut research aircraft powered by an SNECMA Atar 101D2A engine exceeded Mach 1 in level flight without using afterburning.

The first production aircraft to exceed Mach 1 in level flight without afterburner was the Lockheed F-104 Starfighter after its J65 engine was replaced with a J79. The maximum speed without afterburner was Mach 1.05.

The P.1 prototype of the English Electric Lightning, powered by non-afterburning Armstrong Siddeley Sapphire engines, exceeded Mach 1 on 11 August 1954. A week previously, on 4 August, the P.1, WG760 flown by Roland Beamont on its maiden flight, had unknowingly exceeded Mach 1 in a climb. During development testing at English Electric it was established that the Lightning had a stabilized speed capability in level flight, without afterburner, of about Mach 1.2 and for the T.4 (2-seat trainer) 1.08. Flying just above the speed of sound without using afterburners, although done by the contractor as part of some flight trials does not appear to have been relevant to the operational capability of the aircraft. Service trials established intercept profiles for subsonic and supersonic targets at different altitudes with subsonic cruising at a maximum of Mach 0.95 with all supersonic speeds beyond subsonic cruise attained with afterburners.

All the Fairey Delta 2 initial supersonic test flying to Mach 1.1 was done without afterburning. Selecting the afterburner, which initially only had a maximum selection with no intermediate positions, would have caused an uncontrollable rapid acceleration to potentially hazardous speeds; i.e., too far beyond previously established flutter-free speeds.

Only the supersonic transports (SST), Concorde, and the second version of the Tu-144 (the Tu-144D) spent most of their time cruising at their design speeds without needing afterburning. Afterburning was added to Concorde for take-off to cope with weight increases that came after the initial design. It was also used to accelerate through the high-drag transonic speed range, not because the extra thrust was required, but because it was available and improved the operating economics. The redesigned Tu-144D used engines with no afterburners which, together with other improvements, increased the full payload range from 3,080 to 5,330 km (1,910 to 3,310 mi) (Concorde's operational range was 6,470 km or 4,020 mi).

== Military use ==
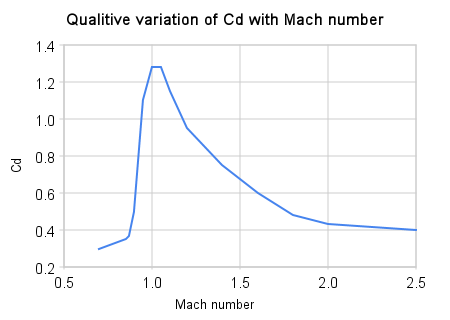
Qualitative variation in Cd factor (drag coefficient) with Mach number (speed) for aircraft; supercruising above Mach 2 is efficient.

The United States Air Force set supercruise as a core requirement for the Advanced Tactical Fighter program, which resulted in the F-22 Raptor. The F-22 Raptor's supercruise capabilities are touted as a major performance advantage over other fighters, with supercruise being demonstrated exceeding Mach 1.5. Supercruise capability provides advantages for stealth aircraft because an afterburner plume reflects radar signals and creates a significant infrared signature. Virtually all fighters prior to the F-22 cruise at Mach 0.8–0.9 while carrying a normal weapons load.

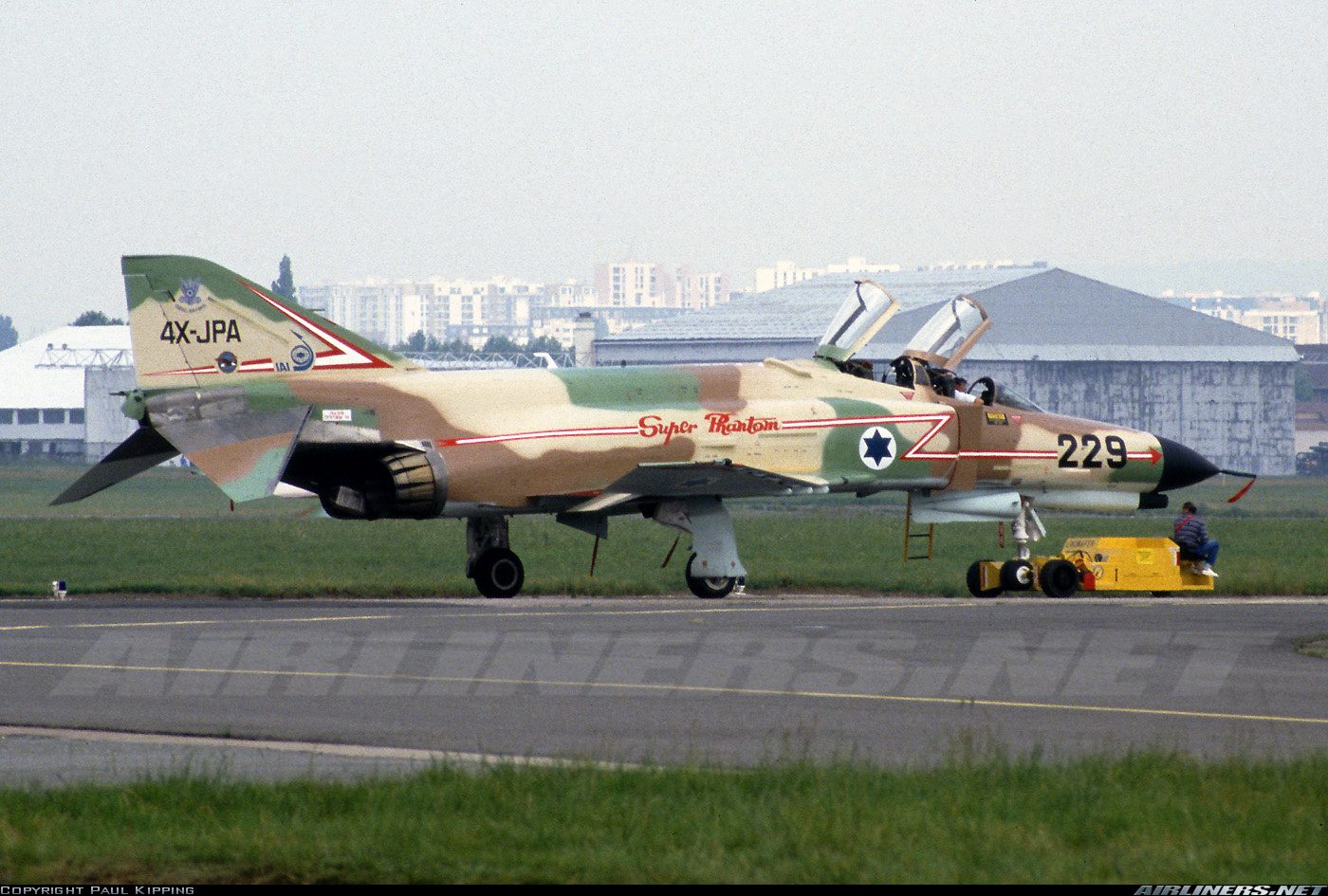
The IAI Super Phantom 2000 is one of the first examples of supercruise capable aircraft.

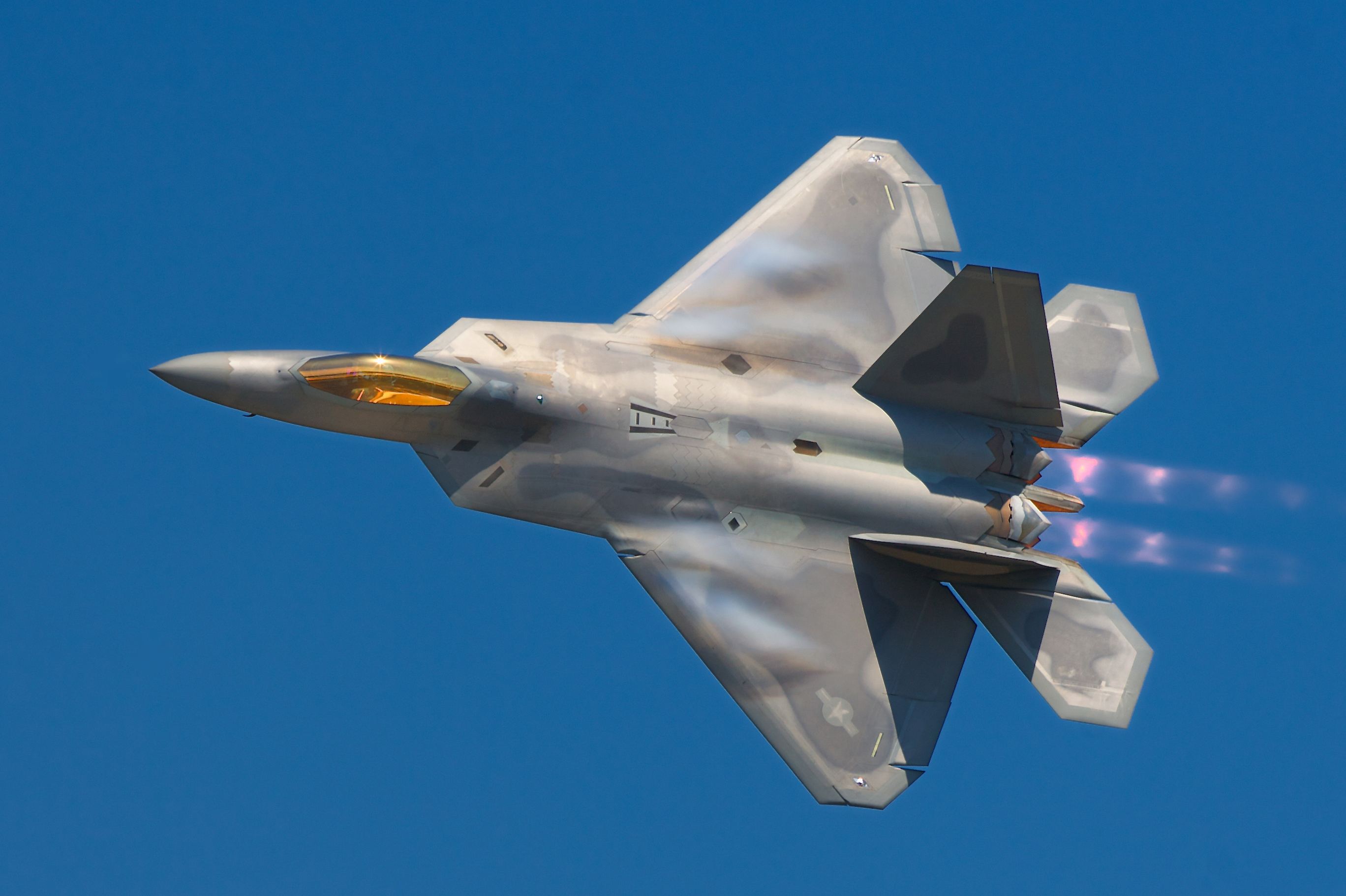
The F-22 Raptor is capable of supercruise above Mach 1.5 (but is seen here with afterburners).

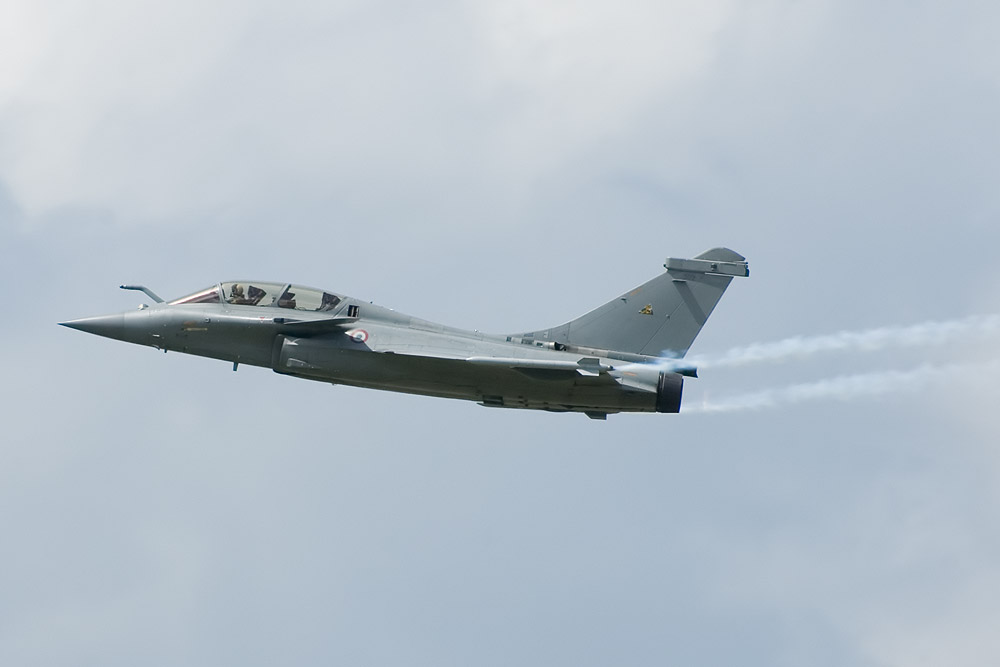
The Dassault Rafale is capable of supercruising with four missiles and a belly drop tank.

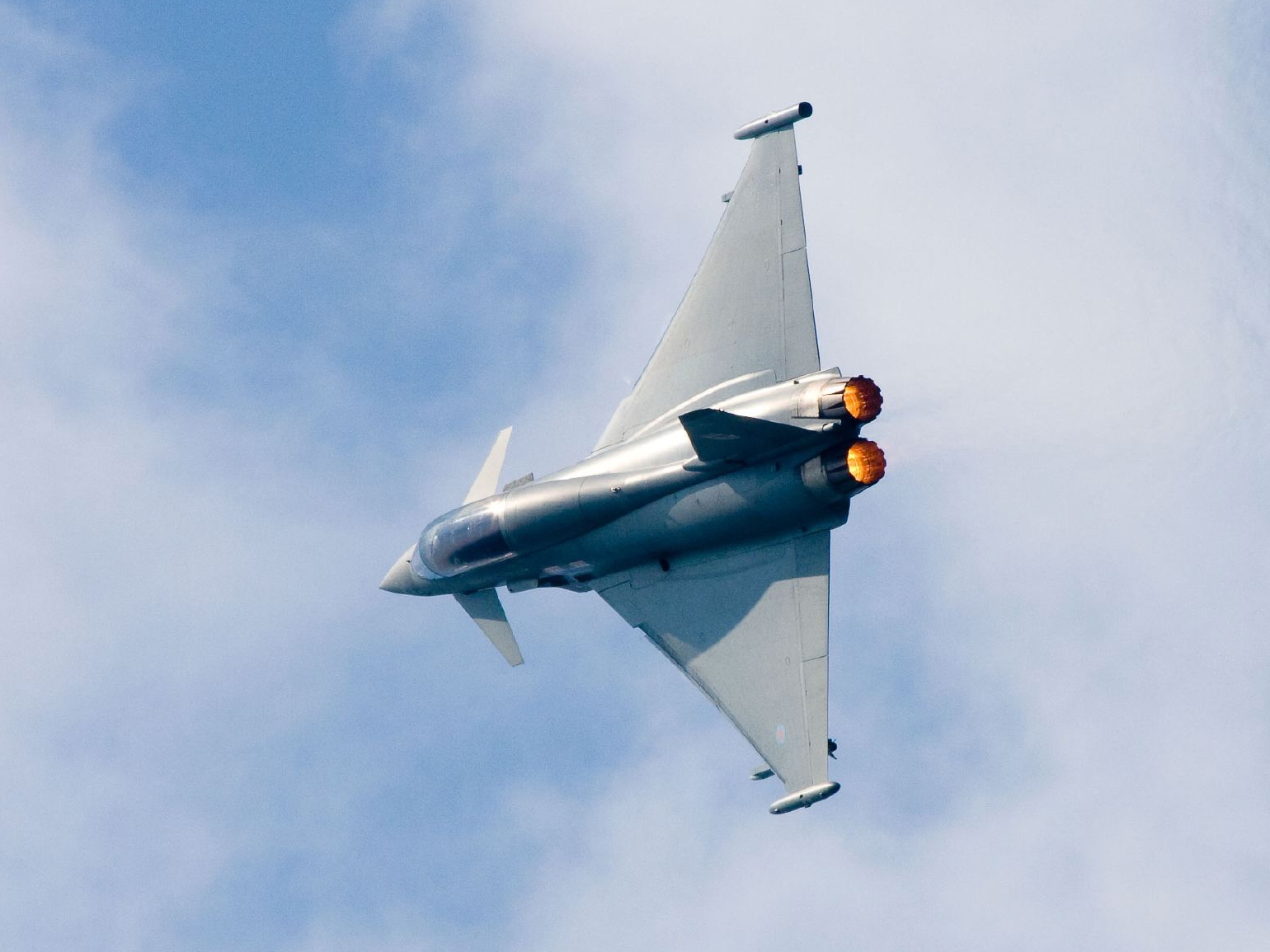
The Eurofighter Typhoon is capable of supercruise at Mach 1.5.

There are a few engines in production that are designed to facilitate tactically significant supercruise:

- The Pratt & Whitney PW1120 was used on the IAI Super Phantom 2000 that had supercruise capability.
- The two Pratt & Whitney F119 that power the F-22 Raptor make it the most capable supercruise-capable fighter aircraft in service. The F-22 Raptor can supercruise above Mach 1.5 without external stores.
- The EJ200 engine built by EuroJet Turbo GmbH mounted in the Eurofighter Typhoon. It is capable of supercruising at Mach 1.5 with an air superiority missile load. Typhoon pilots have stated that Mach 1.3 is attainable in combat configuration with external stores.
- The General Electric F414G in the JAS 39 Gripen NG is designed for supercruise and has achieved Mach 1.2, or Mach 1.1 with an air to air missile load.
- The two Snecma M88s that power the Dassault Rafale enable the Rafale to supercruise with four missiles and a belly drop tank.

Independently, Russia is working on izdeliye 30 (after AL-31F and AL-41F derivatives modifications, like izdeliye 117S turbofan) and RD-33MKRU Morskaja Osa; an all-new AL-41 engine with a complete redesign is underway to add supercruise ability to the Sukhoi Su-57. This has yet to bear fruit, but the stop-gap 117S engine, produced by this program, may achieve the supercruise goal already. While testing a Su-35BM fighter equipped with these engines, it managed to accelerate past Mach 1 without using the afterburner, suggesting that it had supercruise capability. It has yet to be seen whether this will be possible with a combat load.

== Aircraft with supercruise ability ==
Aircraft	Supercruise speed	Production year	Service status
Sukhoi Su-57	Mach 1.30	2020	In service
Dassault Rafale	Mach 1.40	1986	In service
Eurofighter Typhoon	Mach 1.50	1994	In service
Saab JAS-39E Gripen	Mach 1.10	2019	In service
General Dynamics F-16XL	Mach 1.10	1982	Retired (prototype)
Lockheed Martin F-22 Raptor	Mach 1.76	1996	In service
Lockheed YF-22	Mach 1.58	1989	Retired (prototype)
Northrop YF-23	Mach 1.72	1989	Retired (prototype)
Concorde	Mach 2.02	1965	Retired
EWR VJ 101	Mach 1.04	1962	Retired (prototype)
Mikoyan Project 1.44	Mach 1.50	1999	Retired (prototype)
Chengdu J-20	N/A	2009	In service

== See also ==
- Index of aviation articles
