= Saturn AL-41 =

Russian military turbofan engine variants

AL-41F
- Type: Variable cycle turbofan
- National origin: Russia
- Manufacturer: NPO Saturn
- First run: 1990s
- Major applications: Mikoyan Project 1.44

The Saturn AL-41 is a designation for two different Russian military turbofan engine variants by NPO Lyulka-Saturn. The original AL-41F, development designation izdeliye 20, was a variable-bypass ratio turbofan engine, designed for supercruise flight for the MFI (Mnogofunktsionalni Frontovoy Istrebitel, "Multifunctional Frontline Fighter") program, which resulted in the Mikoyan Project 1.44. It is considered to be the Russian counterpart to the General Electric YF120 engine which lost to the more conventional fixed-bypass Pratt & Whitney YF119 in the Advanced Tactical Fighter engine program.

Since the cancellation of the MFI program, the AL-41F1S (izdeliye 117S) and AL-41F1 (izdeliye 117) designations were assigned to engines developed by Lyulka-Saturn, now NPO Saturn, that respectively power the Sukhoi Su-35S and Sukhoi Su-57, but these are heavily upgraded fixed-bypass variants of the AL-31F, rather than variants of the variable cycle izdeliye 20 design.

== Design and development ==
In the late 1970s and early 1980s, the Soviet Defence Ministry identified the need for a 1990s fighter, or I-90, that would eventually succeed the MiG-29 and Su-27, resulting in the MFI fifth-generation multirole fighter program. The AL-41F, with development project designation izdeliye 20, was launched in 1982, and was intended to power the MFI, which was to be developed by Mikoyan under its 1.44/1.42 project. The first prototype engine flew in a MiG-25 Foxbat testbed. An 18–tonne (177 kN, 40,000 lbf) class engine, the AL-41F used a variable bypass architecture to facilitate the aircraft in supercruise, or fly at speeds of Mach 1.5 without afterburner. It had the ambitious goal of increasing the turbine inlet temperature by 250 °C over its AL-31F predecessor, and was expected to incorporate thrust vectoring to enhance the fighter's maneuverability. After the collapse of the Soviet Union, both the MFI and the AL-41F suffered from severe funding disruptions and lengthy delays; production plans for the MFI was halted in 1997 due to high costs. Eventually, 28 AL-41Fs were built and the engine was first flown on the MiG 1.44 in 2000, but it did not advance beyond prototype stage when all further work on the MFI ceased later that year.

With the abandonment of the MFI, the Russian Defence Ministry embarked on the more affordable PAK FA fifth-generation fighter program, with the competitive tender announced in April 2001. As the aircraft from this program would be smaller than the MFI, the AL-41F was too large to fit into the competing proposals. The AL-41 designation was then reused for heavily upgraded variants of the Saturn AL-31 that would power Sukhoi's T-50 design for the PAK FA; these include the AL-41F1 (izdeliye 117) developed for the T-50, eventually named Su-57, as well as the slightly simpler AL-41F1S (izdeliye 117S) derivative for a highly upgraded Su-27 variant called the T-10BM, eventually designated Su-35. Some of the technology of the original AL-41F were applied in the izdeliye 117S and 117 engines, but these engines are not considered a part of the same AL-41F line (izdeliye 20) as was planned for the Mikoyan Project 1.44 because their cores are based on the AL-31F's, whereas the AL-41F utilizes an entirely different approach. The designation is present because the engine approaches some of the projected specifications of the AL-41F. As Sukhoi anticipates that the Su-57 will be the basis for a family of stealth combat aircraft, future improved variants are expected to incorporate a new design from Saturn designated the AL-51F-1, or izdeliye 30, that would eventually replace the AL-41F1.

== Specifications (AL-41F, izdeliye 20) ==
Data from Kommersant, Leteckemotory, Flight International

==== General characteristics ====
- Type: Turbofan
- Length:
- Diameter: 932 mm (36.7 in) Inlet
- Dry weight: 1,500 kg (3,300 lb)

==== Components ====
- Compressor: Axial

==== Performance ====
- Maximum thrust: 177 kN; 39,683 lbf (18 tf)
- Turbine inlet temperature: 1,642 °C (1,915 K; 2,988 °F)
- Thrust-to-weight ratio: 10+

== See also ==
Related development

- Saturn AL-41F1, highly improved AL-31 variant with AL-41F technology applied

Comparable engines

- General Electric YF120
- Pratt & Whitney F119
- Xian WS-15
- IHI Corporation XF9

Related lists

- List of aircraft engines

== Sources ==
- Butowski, Piotr (2021). Su-57 Felon. Stamford, UK: Key Books. ISBN 978-1-913870-44-7.
