= Limited Feedback Interaction =

Limited Feedback Interaction (LFI) is a recording technique used primarily in the creation of improvised music. 'LFI' limits the number of other players each participant can hear; this allows each to focus on one or two of the other players' musical output, instead of on the aggregate output of the entire ensemble. It requires acoustic separation of any player not playing an electric instrument, as well as headphones for all players. Instead of each player listening to the entire ensemble, the number of players in each person's headphones is limited, so that collaboration is more intense and directed—hence the name, 'Limited Feedback Interaction,' abbreviated as 'LFI.' This technique has been described in the newsletter for the Society for Electro-Acoustic Music In the United States (SEAMUS), 2010, issue no. 4, in the article "On not hearing everyone..."

Limited Feedback Interaction networks are divided into two main categories—reciprocal & non-reciprocal—and possess different features (symmetrical vs. asymmetrical). LFI matrices are better suited to certain numbers of players (prime numbers work well), and require a spirit of open-minded collaboration to be successful. They are not limited in size other than by the capabilities of the hardware available; in theory, LFI networks could encompass thousands, if not millions, of people.

== Types of LFI Networks ==
=== Reciprocal ===
In a reciprocal LFI network, each player can hear, and be heard by, the same people. For example, in the following chart we can see each player's headphone-mates:

Can Hear	Player	Is Heard By
5, 2	1	5, 2
1, 3	2	1, 3
2, 4	3	2, 4
3, 5	4	3, 5
4, 1	5	4, 1

Since each player can both hear and be heard by the same subset of players, direct musical interaction and imitation can take place. This variety of LFI matrix is the 'drum circle' type, since playing in it is like playing in a drum circle, wherein one can hear one's immediate neighbors, and one's immediate neighbors can do the same. However, each player's "immediate neighbors" are unique, which effectively gives each player a unique monitor mix within which to improvise.

=== Non-reciprocal ===
In a non-reciprocal LFI network, each player cannot be heard by any players whom she can hear. For example, in the following chart we can see each player's headphone-mates:

Can Hear	Player	Is Heard By
5	1	2
1	2	3
2	3	4
3	4	5
4	5	1

This type of LFI Matrix usually results in a more chaotic, multi-layered piece of music.

== Symmetrical vs. Asymmetrical ==
An LFI matrix's is symmetrical when each participant hears the same number of other players. If LFI matrix participants have differing numbers of 'headphone-mates,' those matrices are asymmetrical. The first example is a seven-person, non-reciprocal symmetrical LFI Matrix:

Can Hear	Player	Is Heard By
6	1	3
7	2	4
1	3	5
2	4	6
3	5	7
4	6	1
5	7	2

The next example is a seven-person, reciprocal asymmetric LFI matrix [this particular matrix occurs when one member of the LFI wishes to hear and be heard by all of the others, usually in an effort to conduct their playing].

Can Hear	Player	Is Heard By
7, 2, 3, 4, 5, 6	1	7, 2, 3, 4, 5, 6
1, 3	2	1, 3
1, 2, 4	3	1, 2, 4
1, 3, 5	4	1, 3, 5
1, 4, 6	5	1, 4, 6
1, 5, 7	6	1, 5, 7
1, 6	7	1, 6

== Potential Uses ==
Limited Feedback Interaction matrices can be used to aid in the creation of any type of improvised music. However, there is also potential for LFI matrices to yield interesting dialogue, productive brainstorming sessions, group-based problem solving, and so forth.
