= Mikoyan Project 1.44 =

Fighter technology demonstrator aircraft

Project 1.44
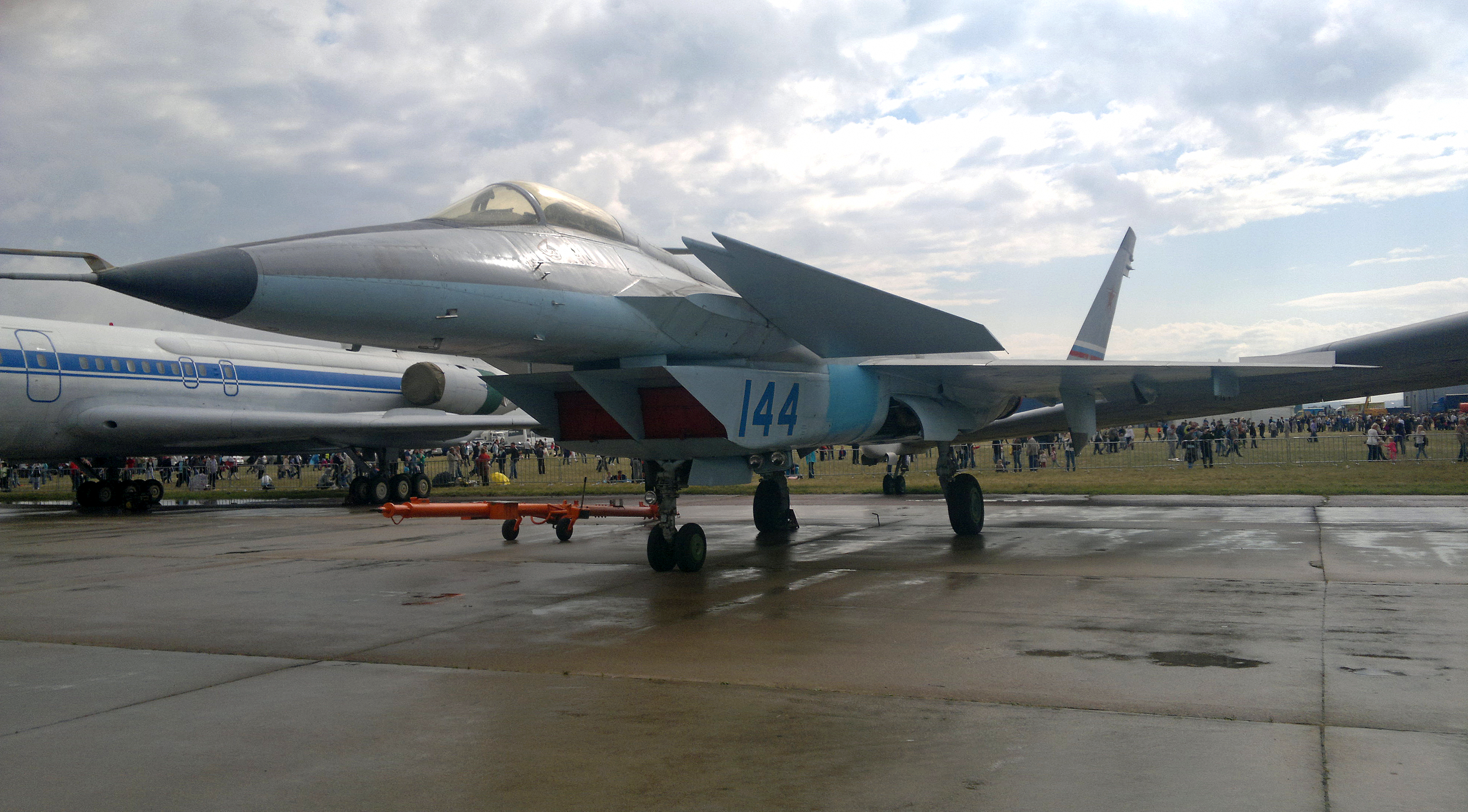
- MiG Project 1.44 at MAKS-2015 air show

General information
- Type: Technology demonstrator
- National origin: Soviet Union / Russia
- Manufacturer: Mikoyan
- Status: Cancelled
- Number built: 1 + 4 1.42 airframes at various stages of completion.

History
- First flight: 29 February 2000

The Mikoyan Project 1.44/1.42 (Note: Also "Object/Article 1.44/1.42". The aircraft is also known as the "MiG-MFI". Although the MFI was once unofficially referred to as the "MiG-35", MiG is now using this designation for an advanced version of the Mikoyan MiG-29.) (Russian: Микоян МиГ-1.44; NATO reporting name: Flatpack) is a multirole fighter technology demonstrator developed by the Mikoyan design bureau. 1.42 refers to the proposed production design, while 1.44 is the designation given to the technology demonstrator. It was designed for the Soviet Union's MFI (Mnogofunksionalni Frontovoy Istrebitel, "Multifunctional Frontline Fighter") project for the I-90 ("1990s fighter") program, the answer to the U.S.'s Advanced Tactical Fighter (ATF). The MFI was to incorporate many fifth-generation jet fighter features such as supermaneuverability, supercruise, and advanced avionics, as well as some degree of radar signature reduction.

The design's development was a protracted one, characterised by repeated and lengthy postponements due to a chronic lack of funds after the collapse of the Soviet Union; the MiG 1.44 made its maiden flight in February 2000, nine years behind schedule, and was cancelled later that year. The MFI project was replaced by the more modern and affordable PAK FA program, which resulted in the Sukhoi Su-57.

== Development ==
=== Preliminary design ===
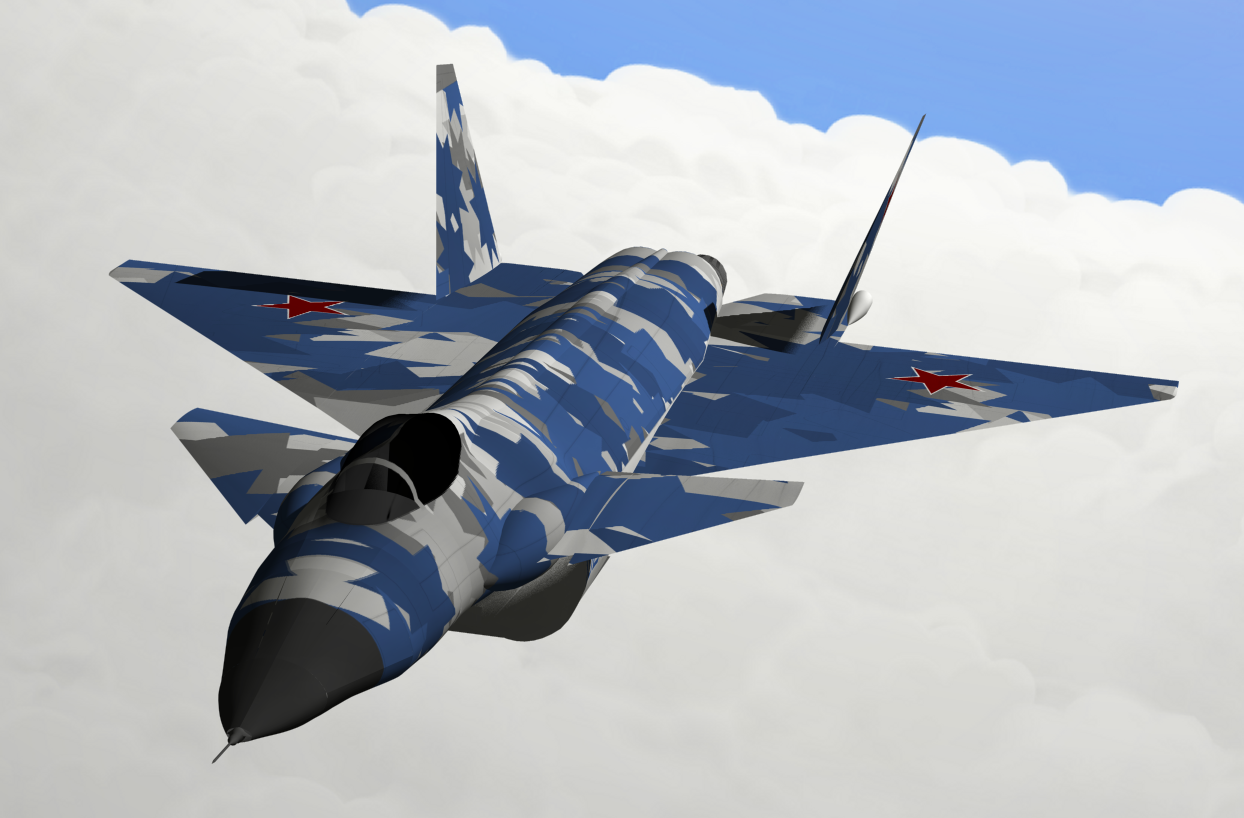
Concept art of MiG 1.44 in flight

The MiG 1.44 had its origins in the early 1980s, when the U.S. Air Force began developing a successor to the F-15 Eagle under the Advanced Tactical Fighter (ATF) project, which would eventually result in the supermaneuverable and stealthy, albeit costly, F-22 Raptor that first flew in 1997. Consequently, the Soviet government tasked its fighter design bureaus the job of developing a fighter with which to counter the perceived American threat, and replace the Sukhoi Su-27. In 1983, the project was formally approved as the I-90 (Russian: И-90, short for: Истребитель 1990-х годов, lit. 'Fighter of the 1990s'). At this time, the attributes of the next generation of fighter aircraft were still not universally defined; the U.S. pursued a dedicated air superiority fighter with the ATF emphasizing stealth and kinematic performance, whereas the Soviet direction instead focused on "multifunctionality", or a multirole fighter with exceptional air-to-ground capability, while similarly emphasizing kinematic performance such as supermaneuverability at high angles-of-attack and increased supersonic endurance. Mikoyan occupied itself with two concurrent projects, one of which focused on a heavy multirole design designated MFI, the other a light tactical fighter named LFI (Lyogkiy Frontovoy Istrebitel, "Light Frontline Fighter"). To minimise costs, both designs were to share as many components as possible.

However, as the research and development phase for the two projects progressed, costs escalated due to the complexity normally associated with advanced aircraft projects. As a result, the Soviet government created the Combined Task Programme in 1983 with the aim of maximising efficiency and developing technologies to be used for all classes of aircraft. Mikoyan became the primary contractor for the programme, the importance of which was illustrated with its inclusion into the Soviet five-year economic plan. The design bureau soon formulated initial specifications for the new fighters.

Mikoyan proceeded with the preliminary design of both the MFI and LFI with participation from numerous institutions, which assisted in the progressive definition of the designs. TsAGI (Tsentralniy Aerogidrodinamicheskiy Institut, "Central Aero- and Hydrodynamic Institute") was responsible for collecting wind tunnel test results, which, along with theoretical studies, were vital during this phase of development. The institution recommended that Mikoyan include canards for the MFI, since it offers great agility and lift, the latter important as the MFI was a statically unstable design. The delta wings then had a wing leading edge sweep of 40–45°. During this period, engineers undertook wind tunnel testing to refine the MFI's aerodynamics and verify its radar cross-section (RCS).

The MFI would have a variable engine intake ramp located under the front fuselage, reminiscent of the Eurofighter Typhoon; this was particularly important with the nature of the aircraft, since it allows for sustained air flow into the engine during sudden manoeuvres. As for the engine themselves, research was conducted on thrust vectoring, allowing for markedly improved maneuverability and short take-off and landing performance. Besides the mechanical and aerodynamic aspects of the design, engineers investigated hundreds of issues to refine the layout and specifications. In 1987, Mikoyan and the associated institutions submitted the MFI and LFI proposals for review.

The MFI production version 1.42 was intended to feature a weapons bay to decrease the radar cross section, however, the technology demonstrator 1.44 was not equipped with one.

=== Full-scale development ===
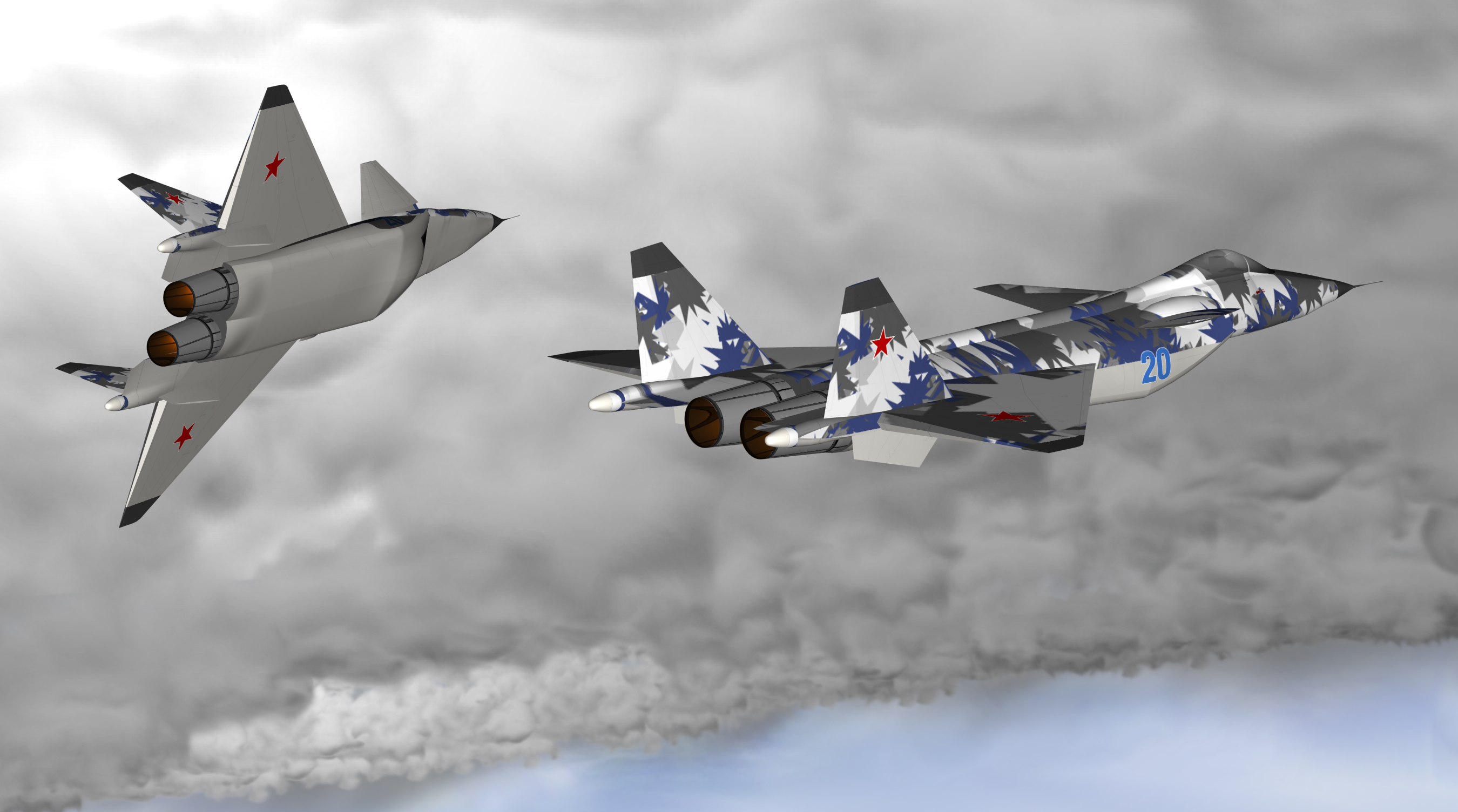
An artist's conception of the MiG 1.44 technology demonstrator

While both MFI and LFI designs passed critical review, due to budgetary constraints, Mikoyan shelved the latter to free up funds for the development of the MFI, which had by then been redesignated Izdeliye (product) 1.42. Under the leadership and coordination of Chief Project Engineer Gheogiy A. Sedov, Mikoyan embarked on major design effort. Because the LFI was shelved, 1.42 had by then assumed the multi-role approach, meaning that it had to fulfill both air-to-air and air-to-ground missions. TsAGI was still a part of the design effort, having tested radio-controlled models for research into stability and handling characteristics, particularly at high angles of attack. It was later confirmed that the 1.42 is still controllable at angles of attack of up to 60°.

By now the specifications were being firmed. Engineers from various establishments had settled on a definite design, having refined the flight-control software, verified all wind tunnel test results, and checked important systems using test rigs and modified aircraft. In 1988, Mikoyan was issued a specific operational requirement for the 1.42. Three years later, the design passed the Soviet Air Force's critical review. This paved the way for the construction of a flyable technology demonstrator, and so Mikoyan issued specifications to specialized factories tasked with such roles.

The technology demonstrator, bearing the designation 1.44, would be used to verify the aerodynamic layout and flight control system of the design. Construction of it was halfway when the collapse of the Soviet Union brought a halt to further funding. Inevitably the scheduled first flight of the almost-complete aircraft slipped indefinitely. However, full-scale mock-ups and sections of the 1.44 were built in support of static tests, while factories were gearing up for the construction of prototypes. Mikoyan lobbied the government to declassify the project so it could display the aircraft at various air shows. In June 1995, MiG's Deputy General Designer Anatoliy Belosvet announced that the prototype could be displayed at that year's MAKS Airshow; in the end, the government refused. The company tried in 1997, to no avail.

=== Testing and cancellation ===
In early 1994, the incomplete aircraft was transported to Zhukovsky Airfield, where it would undertake flight tests. Ground tests began later that year, culminating in the first high-speed runs with Mikoyan's Chief Test Pilot Roman Taskayev at the controls. As the test program's tempo increased, the programme was postponed as the design bureau did not have sufficient funds to purchase the remaining components still missing on the demonstrator. This would be the main factor in the indefinite postponement of the program for the next few years. In 1997, the Russian government cancelled production of the design due to its unacceptably high unit cost. Mikoyan was financially insecure, resulting with the change in the management during the years leading up to 2000; this opened up other sources of funds. A prospective sale to the Indian Air Force fell through, as Mikoyan demanded extraordinarily high royalty payments of USD 5 billion to set up local production.

The change in the company's management also brought many changes. The Russian government revealed the project's existence in late 1998. On 24 December 1998, the Nezavisimaya Gazeta published a brief article on the fighter, accompanied by several photos. During 1999, final preparations were made for first flight. The aircraft was finally completed. It underwent ground tests, including high-speed taxis during which the aircraft was rotated. On 12 January 1999, the 1.44 was officially rolled out in the presence of top-ranking Russian military and government personnel, international journalists and other dignitaries. Until then, the status of the 1.44 was largely a secret; the previous day, however, Aviation Week & Space Technology published a photo taken from the roof of the hangar in which the demonstrator was parked.

On 29 February 2000, the aircraft performed its first flight at the hands of Vladimir Gorboonov. During the 18-minute flight, the 1.44 reached a maximum height of 1,000 m (3,300 ft) and reached speeds of 600 km/h (370 mph). The aircraft touched down at 11:43 am Moscow Time, amid tight security. Gorboonov later described the aircraft as docile. After the 22-minute second flight on 27 April, engineers probably uncovered some problems, since there were no reported flights thereafter. The program has since been cancelled, with the sole prototype known residing at Gromov Flight Research Institute, it was later restored/refurbished and was displayed at MAKS 2015.

After the cancellation of the MFI programme, the PAK FA (Perspektivnyi Aviatsionnyi Kompleks Frontovoi Aviatsyi – Prospective Air Complex for Tactical Air Forces) programme was initiated to develop an advanced air superiority to succeed the Project 1.42/1.44. In 2001, India agreed with Russia to make the programme a development/production joint-venture between the two nations. Both Mikoyan and Sukhoi submitted concepts to the Defense Ministry for the PAK FA program, with MiG entering an updated design from their MFI proposal. The Russian Defense Ministry selected the Sukhoi Design Bureau as the primary contractor for the PAK FA fighter, which became the Su-57.

== Design ==
Note: Since the MiG 1.44 did not conduct an extensive flight test program, not all predicted performance aspects were verified. Thus, this section refers to the design as the MiG MFI.

The MiG MFI was a delta wing, twin-tailed, fifth-generation air superiority/strike fighter design that incorporated advanced technology to theoretically give the aircraft excellent stealth and fighting attributes. It featured a close-coupled canard layout which, when working with the thrust vectoring engine nozzles, gave the aircraft remarkable maneuverability. The aircraft had a tricycle landing gear system, with a single, dual-wheel landing gear in the front, and two single wheels in the rear. The MFI had relaxed stability and was controlled by a fly-by-wire flight control system. Mikoyan made use of weight-saving materials in the construction of the aircraft, with aluminum-lithium alloys making up 35% of the empty weight, steel and titanium alloys (30%), composites (30%) and others (5%).

The MiG MFI was unconventional in its layout, in an effort to improve in-flight efficiency and stealth characteristics. Efforts were made to minimize surface-area, possibly to reduce drag. The wings were of delta planform, with leading-edge sweep at 52°. At the tips were dielectric fairings which housed electronic countermeasures/electronic support measures. The wings had full-span leading-edge flaps. The canards, meanwhile, had a leading-edge sweep of 58°, and had prominent dogtooth which improved airflow over the wings at high alpha (angles of attack). Russian aviation experts claim that the unorthodox design, use of radar-absorbent materials (RAM), and internally mounted weapons, gave a radar cross-section (RCS) of less than 0.3 m^{2} (3.2 sq ft). The RCS is estimated to be 0.001 m^{2} (0.011 sq ft) with the use of a plasma shield.

Two Lyul'ka Saturn AL-41F afterburning turbofans produced 177 kN (40,000 lbf) of thrust, giving the MFI a top speed of Mach 2.35. The engines are variable cycle, which increased supersonic dry thrust and allowed the jet to supercruise at Mach 1.5. The axisymmetrical engine nozzles could be vectored in both pitch and yaw planes. The nozzle's inner petals were lined with ceramic tiles to reduce infrared signature. The engines, through serpentine ducts covered in RAM, were fed by a double intake ramp with a splitter plate underneath the front fuselage. Weapons and fuel drop tanks could be carried under the wings as well.

The fighter is equipped with a glass cockpit and features a Pulse-Doppler radar. The N014 radar, with a range of 420 km (260 mi) and target detection from 250 km (160 mi) to one metre (3.3 ft), was able to track up to 40 targets and shoot against 20. The radar system has a passive electronically scanned array antenna and is linked to a fire-control system. The 1.42/1.44 fighter technology is believed to have been applied to the smaller Mikoyan LMFS fifth-generation light fighter project.

Some Russian military analysts believe that the Chinese fifth generation Chengdu J-20 drew heavy inspiration from or was based on the MiG 1.44, citing similarities in its canards, tail section, and "duck like" aerodynamic design.

== Variants ==
- MiG 1.42: Primary version for production; performance was to be better than that of the 1.44. NATO assigned it the code name "Foxglove".
- MiG 1.44: Demonstrator prototype with failed upgrades; 1 was built. NATO assigned it the code name "Flatpack".
- MiG 1.42R: Proposed reconnaissance variant with reconnaissance equipment in the weapons bay.
- MiG 1.42K: Proposed naval variant with folding wings, arrestor hook, strengthened landing gear and enhanced corrosion protection.
- MiG 1.42 trainer: Proposed two-seat trainer variant.

== Specifications (Project 1.42/44) ==
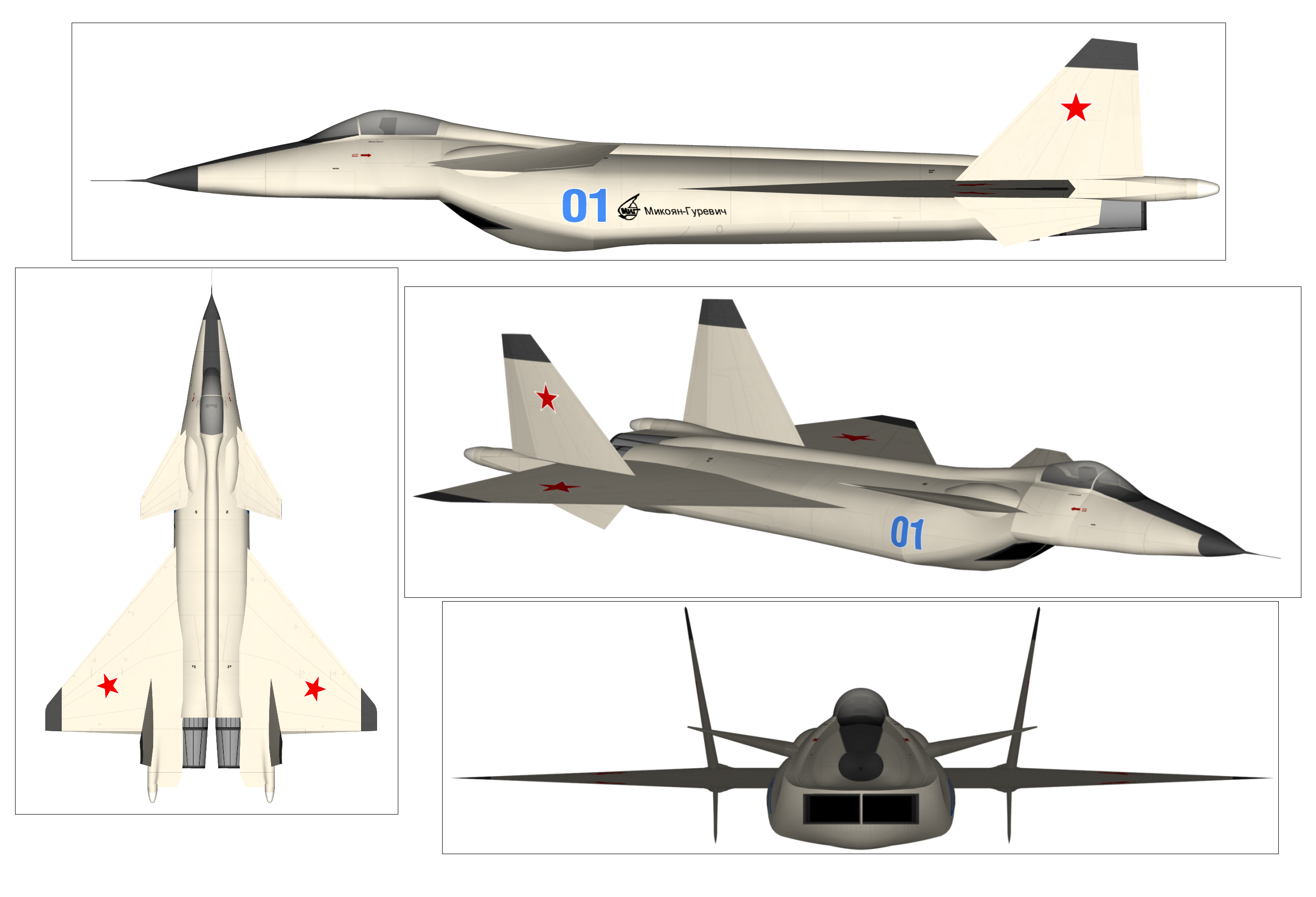
3-dimensional view

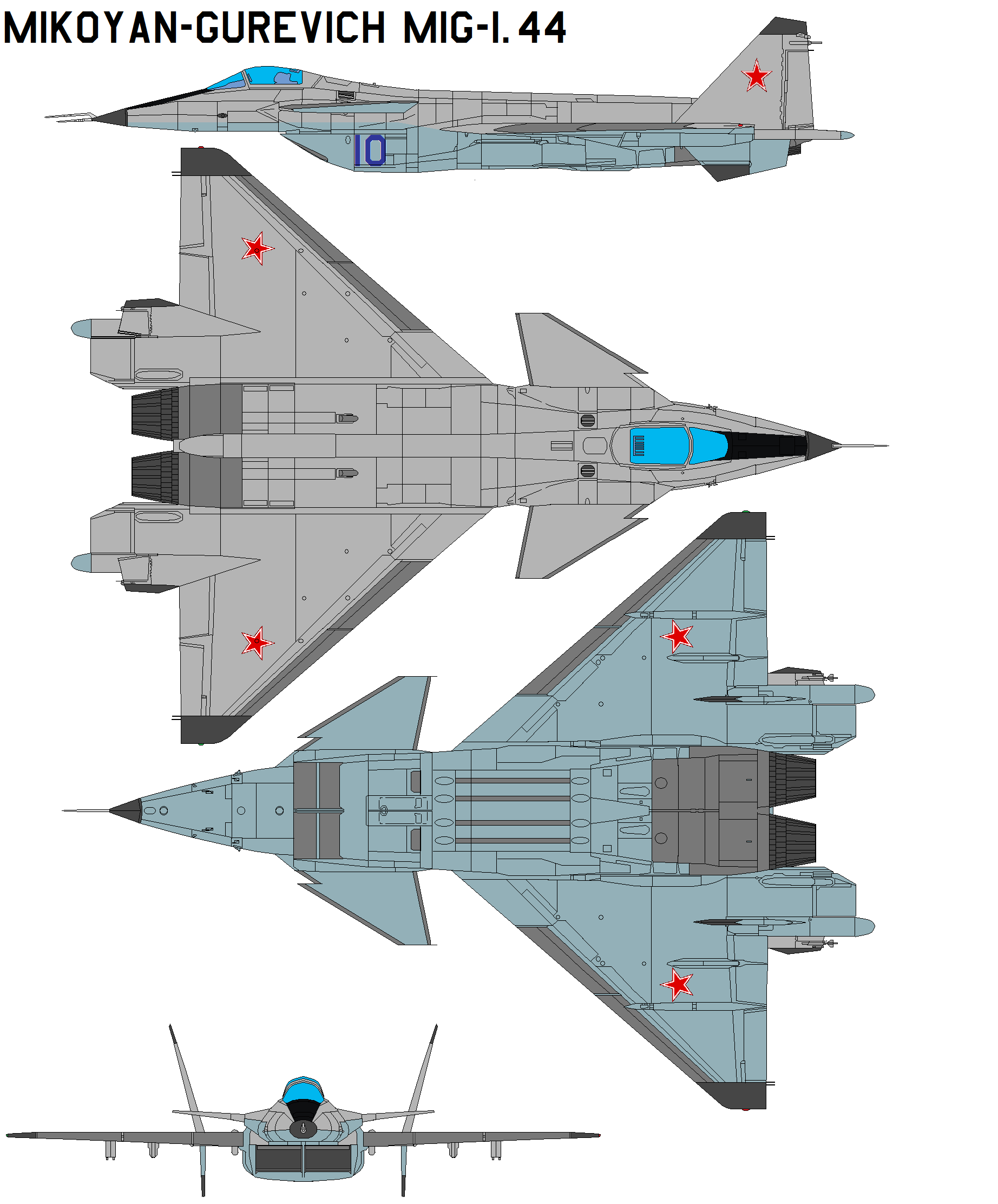
4-view illustration

Note: Since the 1.44 and 1.42 never went beyond pre-production, most specifications are estimated.

Data from Key Aero

General characteristics

- Crew: 1
- Length: 21.7 m (71 ft 2 in)
- Wingspan: 17 m (55 ft 9 in)
- Height: 4.5 m (14 ft 9 in)
- Empty weight: 18,000 kg (39,683 lb)
- Gross weight: 28,600 kg (63,052 lb)
- Max takeoff weight: 37,000 kg (81,571 lb)
- Fuel capacity: 13,000 kg (29,000 lb)
- Powerplant: 2 × Lyulka AL-41F afterburning turbofan engines, 177 kN (40,000 lbf) with afterburner

Performance

- Maximum speed: 2,480 km/h (1,540 mph, 1,340 kn)
- Maximum speed: Mach 2.35
- Supercruise: Mach 1.5 (1,580 km/h, 990 mph) supercruise at altitude
- Range: 4,000 km (2,500 mi, 2,200 nmi)
- Service ceiling: 17,000 m (56,000 ft)
- Thrust/weight: 1.09

Armament

- Guns: 1 × 30 mm Gryazev-Shipunov GSh-30-1 autocannon with 250 rounds
- Missiles:
  - R-77 air-to-air missiles
  - R-73 AAMs
  - R-37 AAMs

Avionics
N014 PESA radar with 420 km range vs 5 m^{2} RCS; 40 targets tracking; 20 targets lock on

== See also ==
Related development

- Mikoyan LMFS
- Sukhoi Su-57

Aircraft of comparable role, configuration, and era

- Sukhoi Su-47
- Sukhoi/HAL FGFA
- Chengdu J-20
- Shenyang J-35
- Lockheed Martin F-22 Raptor
- Northrop YF-23

Related lists

- List of fighter aircraft
