= Post-PFI Soviet/Russian aircraft projects =

Abandoned military aircraft projects of Russia

The Soviet post-PFI projects are several Soviet and Russian Air Force projects initiated to replace the PFI-era aircraft.

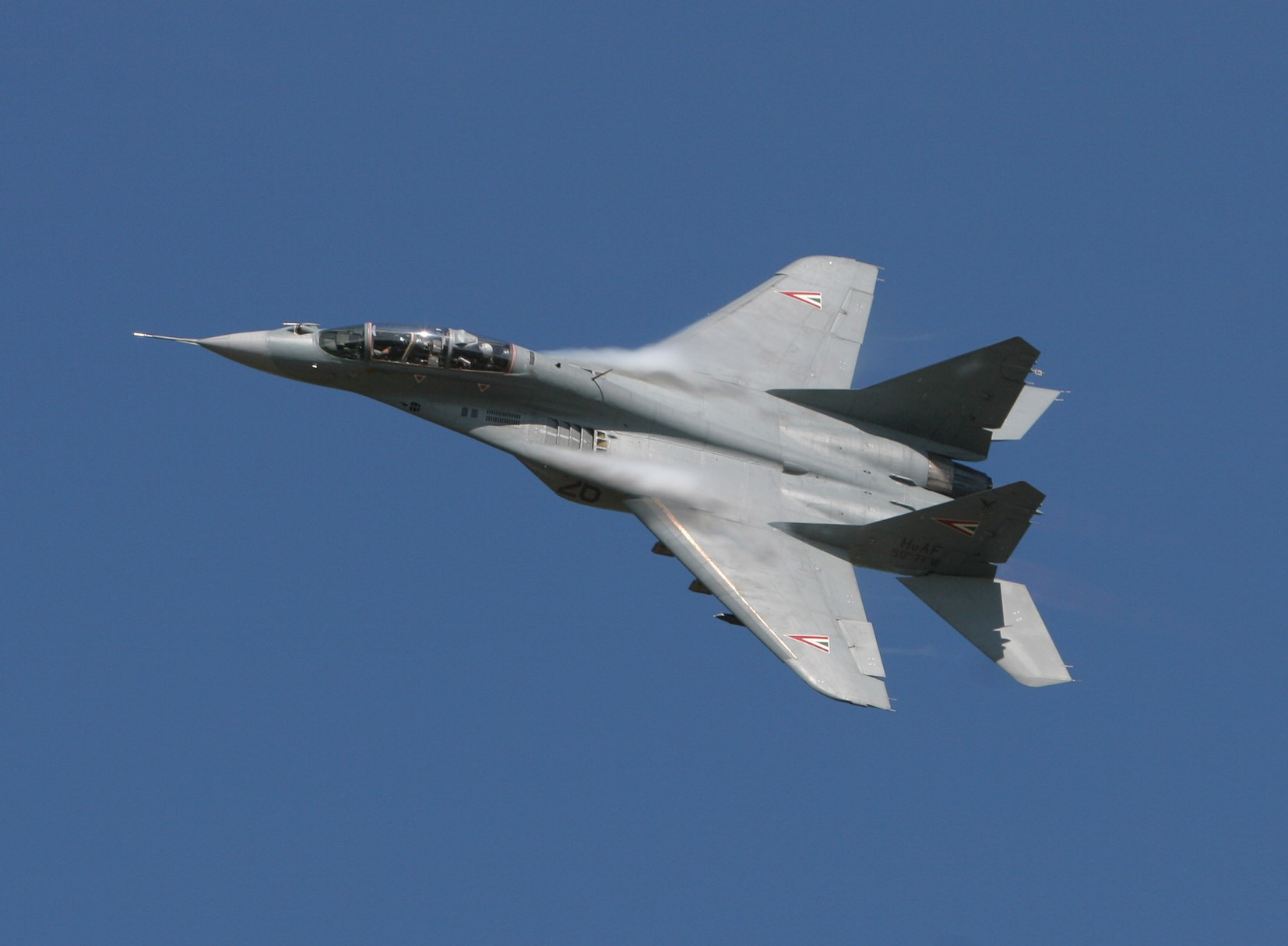
The result of the LPFI project was the Mikoyan MiG-29 Fulcrum.

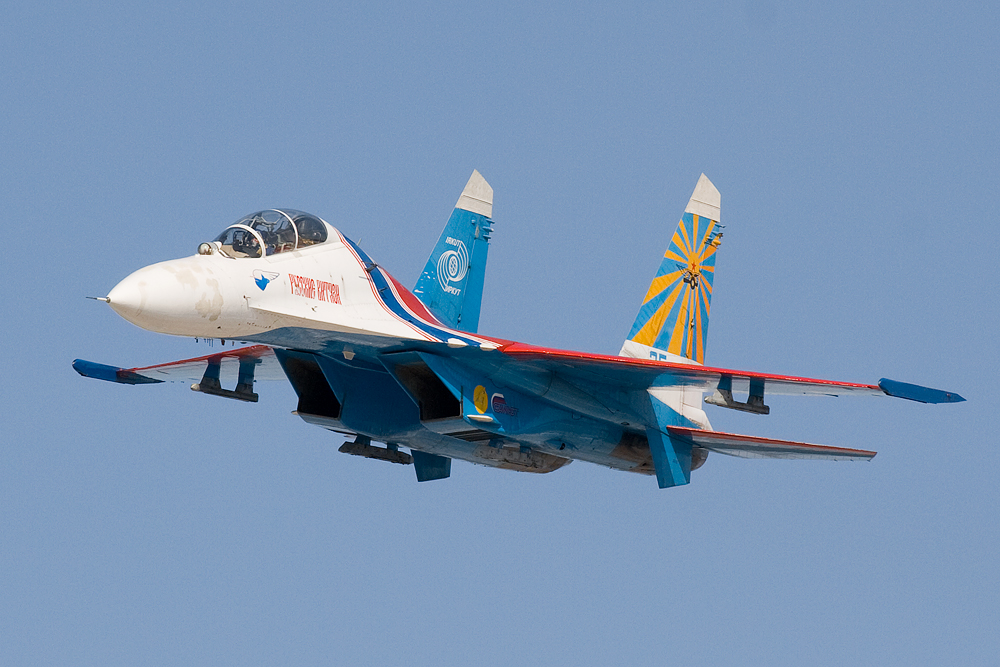
The result of the TPFI project was the Sukhoi Su-27 Flanker.

During the mid-1970s, the Soviets initiated the I-90 fighter project, Sh-90 attack aircraft project, B-90 bomber project and M-67 reconnaissance aircraft project; the "-90" in many of these designations refers to the goal of service entry in the 1990s timeframe. The I-90 consisted of a heavyweight fighter project (MFI) and a lightweight fighter project (LFI). The LFI was subsequently cancelled and replaced by the LFS during the early-mid-1990s. In the early 2000s, both the MFI and LFS projects were canceled in favor of the PAK FA program.

The Sh-90, B-90 and M-67 projects were never realized, although Yakovlev's and Mikoyan's entries for the Sh-90 were based on the Yak-130 and MiG-AT, respectively. Both are trainer aircraft currently being offered for sale by the two companies, with the Yakovlev Yak-130 accepted into service and starting to replace Aero L-39 Albatros as the primary jet trainer of the Russian Air Force. Sukhoi, Mikoyan and Yakovlev were the major competitors in these projects, although Tupolev and Myasishchev may have also submitted entries for some projects.

== History ==
In 1969, the Soviet Union became aware of the existence of the United States' "teen"-series of aircraft, including the Grumman F-14 Tomcat, McDonnell Douglas F-15 Eagle, General Dynamics F-16 Fighting Falcon and McDonnell Douglas F/A-18 Hornet. In response, the Soviets initiated the Perspektivnyi Frontovoy Istrebitel (Перспективный Фронтовой Истребитель, ПФИ, PFI, "Perspective Frontline Fighter") project to develop a multirole fighter aircraft capable of countering the new generation of U.S. aircraft. The PFI project then branched into two projects, the Tyazholy Perspektivnyi Frontovoy Istrebitel, "Heavy Perspective Frontline Fighter" (TPFI) and the Lyogkiy Perspektivnyi Frontovoy Istrebitel, "Light Perspective Frontline Fighter" (Лёгкий Перспективный Фронтовой Истребитель, LPFI). The goal of the TPFI project was to develop a fighter capable of long-range flight, primarily to intercept hostile aircraft, which resulted in the Sukhoi Su-27 "Flanker" series of aircraft. The LPFI was intended to develop a light multi-role fighter with short flight range, but capable of providing air-to-ground support when deployed close to the frontlines, which resulted in the Mikoyan MiG-29 "Fulcrum" series of aircraft. After successfully developing fighters for these two projects, the Soviets initiated a project to develop a next-generation aircraft in response to potentially new American aircraft. These projects included fighters, attack aircraft, and bombers.

== I-90 ==
The I-90 (Istrebitel, Fighter) project consisted of the MFI (heavyweight fighter) and LFI (lightweight fighter). Eventually, the LFI was cancelled in favor of the LFS, although both the LFS and MFI were subsequently canceled in favor of the PAK FA.

=== MFI ===
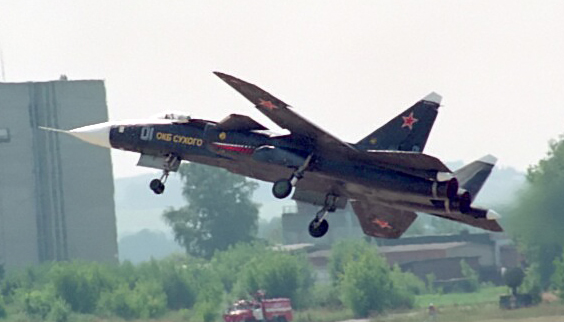
The Su-47 was developed by Sukhoi to match the MiG 1.44.

The goal of the Mnogofunksionalni Frontovoy Istrebitel ("Multifunctional Frontline Fighter"; MFI) project was to create a heavy fighter with exceptional air-to-ground capabilities. Initially, Mikoyan worked on the project 512, which resembled the F-15 because of the boxed air intakes on the side of the fuselage, although the wing was placed lower and the fuselage design was slightly altered. However, Mikoyan's proposed design was the MiG 1.42, an aircraft with two 2D thrust vectoring engines, canards, wedged air intakes on the bottom (much like the Eurofighter Typhoon) and 16 flight control surfaces. A design was later upgraded to the MiG 1.44, which has a modified radome, 3D thrust-vectoring engines, modified wings and a refueling probe.

Yakovlev's entry was visually similar to Mikoyan's entry - a canard-equipped fighter - although Yakovlev's design had only one engine and boxed air intakes on the sides. The Yak-MFI design never materialized and only remained a mockup.

Sukhoi did not submit an entry, due to their confidence in the Sukhoi Su-27 Flanker design. Eventually, Mikoyan was awarded the development of the MFI project. However, as work on the MFI progressed, Sukhoi discovered that the MiG-MFI design was a major threat to the Su-27 design, and began a heavy fighter design of their own, although the MFI project was awarded to Mikoyan two years before. This design resulted in the S-32 forward-swept wing fighter with two engines and canard foreplanes. The design was later altered to add an elevator and modified canards. The design was once again modified to have 2D thrust-vectoring nozzles. Instability in the design resulted in a further upgraded fighter named the S-37, later redesignated the Sukhoi Su-47.

A 1.44 prototype was eventually built and flown in early 2000, although the project was cancelled in 1997 in favor of the PAK FA.

=== LFI ===
The LFI (Lyogkiy Frontovoy Istrebitel, Light Frontline Fighter) project was intended to develop a lightweight fighter with respectable air-to-ground capabilities. Yakovlev proposed the Yak-43, an upgraded Yak-41 with a stealthier design and more powerful engines. After neglecting the MFI competition, Sukhoi decided to submit a design for the LFI called the S-37 (unrelated to the heavyweight forward-swept wing fighter). This S-37 resembled the Gripen in that it had canard foreplanes, a delta wing and one engine. Mikoyan entered the MiG 4.12. MiG could not afford to develop both the MFI and LFI, so their LFI entry was eventually withdrawn.

=== LFS ===
The focus of the LFS (Lyogkiy Frontovoy Samolyot, Light Frontline Aircraft) project shifted to creating a strike fighter with significant surface attack capability, while retaining respectable air combat abilities. Work on the project began around 1994, although the program was officially initiated in 1999. Yakovlev's entry resembled the JSF entry from BAE, as the JSF program purchased information from the Yakovlev design bureau. Initially, Sukhoi's entry was the S-52, a lightweight version of the S-32, retaining the Forward-swept wing and canards, but with only one thrust vectoring engine and boxed air intakes to the side. Sukhoi later proposed the S-55, a design based on their S-54 trainer aircraft. The S-55 bore a strong resemblance to the Su-27, although it only had one engine. Sukhoi later proposed the S-56, a stealthy fighter design with canards and one engine. Mikoyan proposed the I-2000, an aircraft with an unusually large LERX which gave it an ability to sustain controlled flight at a very high angle of attack. The LFS project was cancelled in 2001 in favor of the PAK FA program, although the I-2000 later influenced the design of the HESA Shafaq.

== PAK FA ==
The PAK FA (Perspektivnyi Aviatsionnyi Kompleks Frontovoy Aviatsyi - "Perspective Aviation-Complex Frontline Aviation" [Perspective Multirole Frontline Aircraft]) is an ongoing program to develop a stealth-capable multirole fighter for the Russian Air Force. The program began in 2001, just after the cancellation of the MFI and LFS programs in lieu of a newer, more affordable next-generation multirole fighter. Mikoyan, Sukhoi and Yakovlev submitted designs, but the PAK FA program was awarded to the Sukhoi T-50 (unrelated to the T-50 Golden Eagle). Both Mikoyan and Yakovlev have a 15% share on development and production of the aircraft. The flight testing phase of the aircraft began in 2010, and the aircraft entered service in 2020 as the Su-57.

=== Russian-Indian fifth-generation fighter program ===
FGFA was the earlier designation for the Indian version of the PAK FA, while the combined project is now called the Perspective Multi-Role Fighter (PMF). The completed joint Indian/Russian versions of the single-seat or two-seat PMF will differ from the current T-50 flying prototypes through the addition of stealth, supercruise, sensors, networking, and combat avionics for a total of 43 improvements. Two separate prototypes will be developed, one by Russia and a separate one by India. According to HAL chairman A.K. Baweja (speaking shortly after the India-Russia Inter-Governmental Committee meeting on 18 September 2008), both the Russian and Indian versions of the aircraft will be single-seaters. The FGFA will be predominantly armed with weapons of Indian origin such as the Astra, a beyond-visual-range missile (BVR) being developed by India. Although in keeping with the Russian BVR doctrine of using a variety of different missiles for versatility and unpredictability to countermeasures, the aircraft is expected to have compatibility with various missile types. The FGFA may include systems developed by third parties. India withdrew from the program in 2018 due to concerns over performance and technology sharing.

== Mikoyan LMFS ==
The Mikoyan LMFS (Russian: Микоян ЛМФС) was a proposed Russian stealth, single-engine fighter aircraft, loosely based on the canceled Mikoyan Project 1.44. Images revealed a fighter design with substantially larger internal weapons bays. It was designed to replace the Mikoyan MiG-29.

== Sh-90 ==
The Sh-90 (Shturmovik, Attack Aircraft) project intended to develop an attack aircraft to replace the Su-25. The main entries consisted of modified trainer designs from MiG and Yakovlev, and an unusual two-cockpit design from Sukhoi. The project was later cancelled due to the emergence of modernized Su-25 variants, such as the Su-25T, Su-25TM (Su-39) and Su-25KM.

Instead, the creation of the Su-34 may replace the Su-25 for future strike missions and fulfill similar combat roles.

=== LUS ===
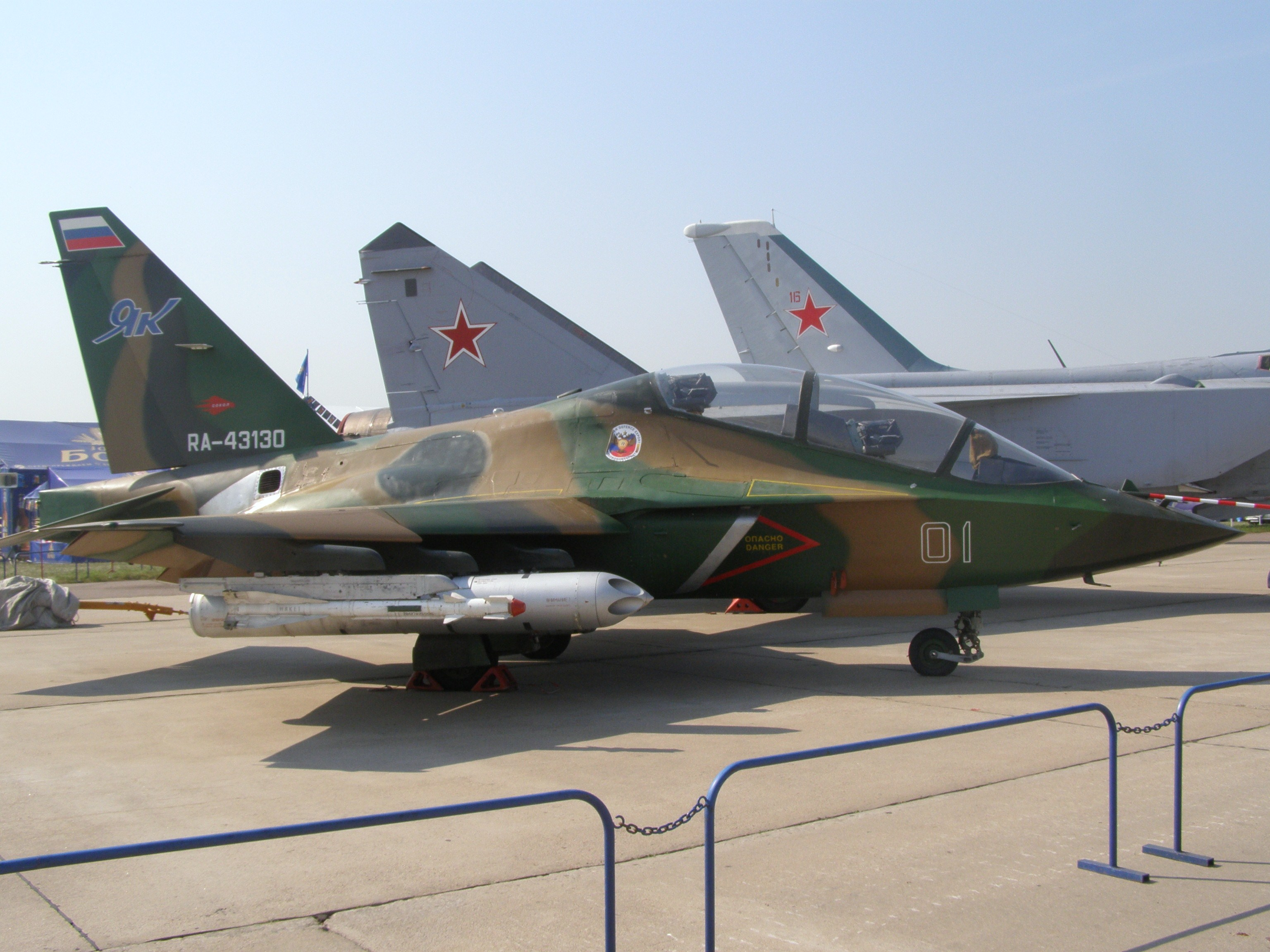
Yakovlev proposed the Yak-133, a modified version of this Yak-130.

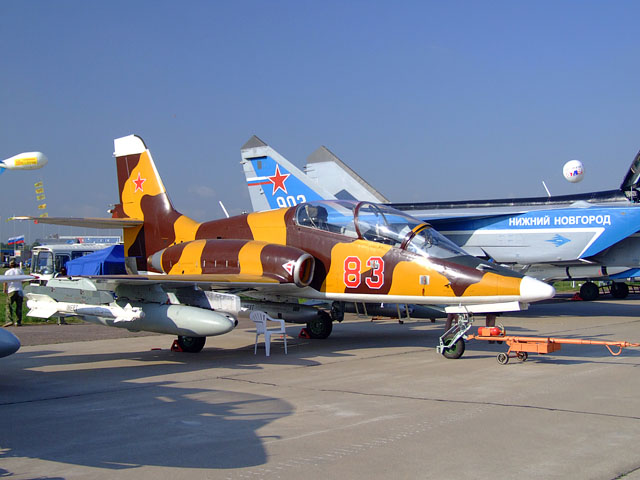
Mikoyan proposed the MiG-AC, a modified version of this MiG-AT.

The LUS (Lyogkiy Udarnyi Samolyot, "Light Strike Aircraft") project's goal was to develop an attack aircraft to succeed the Sukhoi Su-25. Sukhoi's design was an unusual aircraft with two cockpits, a v-tail and a large fuselage. The left fuselage was to contain the piloting equipment and radar sensors, whereas the right fuselage was to accommodate the weapons systems and a fire-control system. The aircraft was to be powered by one or two non-afterburning engines, and payload was to be stored within two large internal bays. Yakovlev and Mikoyan's design were based on their modified trainer models, the Yak-133 and the MiG-AC, respectively. The Yak-133 was a modification of the Yak-130, and the MiG-AC was a modification of the MiG-AT. The project was canceled in the early 1990s due to newer models of Su-25 proving to be sufficient in achieving this goal.

== B-90 ==
The B-90 (Bombardirovshik, "Bomber") project was intended to develop a next generation bomber aircraft to replace Tu-22Ms, although the project seems to have been cancelled before much work was accomplished. It is believed that the main competitors were Myasishchev and Sukhoi. Sukhoi submitted the T-60 design, which had a variable-geometry wing on the lower fuselage, two 2D thrust vectoring engines, a flat lifting fuselage, stealth capability, the ability to store ALCMs within its bay and Mach 2+ speed. There were at least three different designs named T-60 and T-60S. They resulted in final T-54 design, submitted around 1993. The B-90 project seems to have halted with the development of the Su-32 and the Tu-22M5 models as well as the Russian PAK DA. Myasishchev responded with a derivative of the Myasishchev M-67 high altitude reconnaissance aircraft, the M-6LK-M. The program was later canceled due to lack of funds.

== MDP interceptor ==
«MDP» (Multifunctional Distant Interceptor), was to be a very long-range replacement for the MiG-31. Izdeliye 701 (or Project 7.01) concept was similar to the T-60S and the original Tu-22 Blinder, it featured twin engines above the fuselage, connected to the vertical stabilizer. A relatively large aircraft, 30–31m long, with a 19m wingspan (including a highly swept double delta wing plus canards). Maximum takeoff weight would have been around 70 tons. Projected top speed of 2.500 km/h, a supercruising speed of 2.100 km/h at 17.000m, range of 7.000 km supersonic – 11.000 km subsonic. Possible missiles would have been KS-172.

== See also ==
- Sukhoi Su-47
