= Lockheed Martin F-35 Lightning II =

American stealth multirole fighter aircraft

F-35 Lightning II
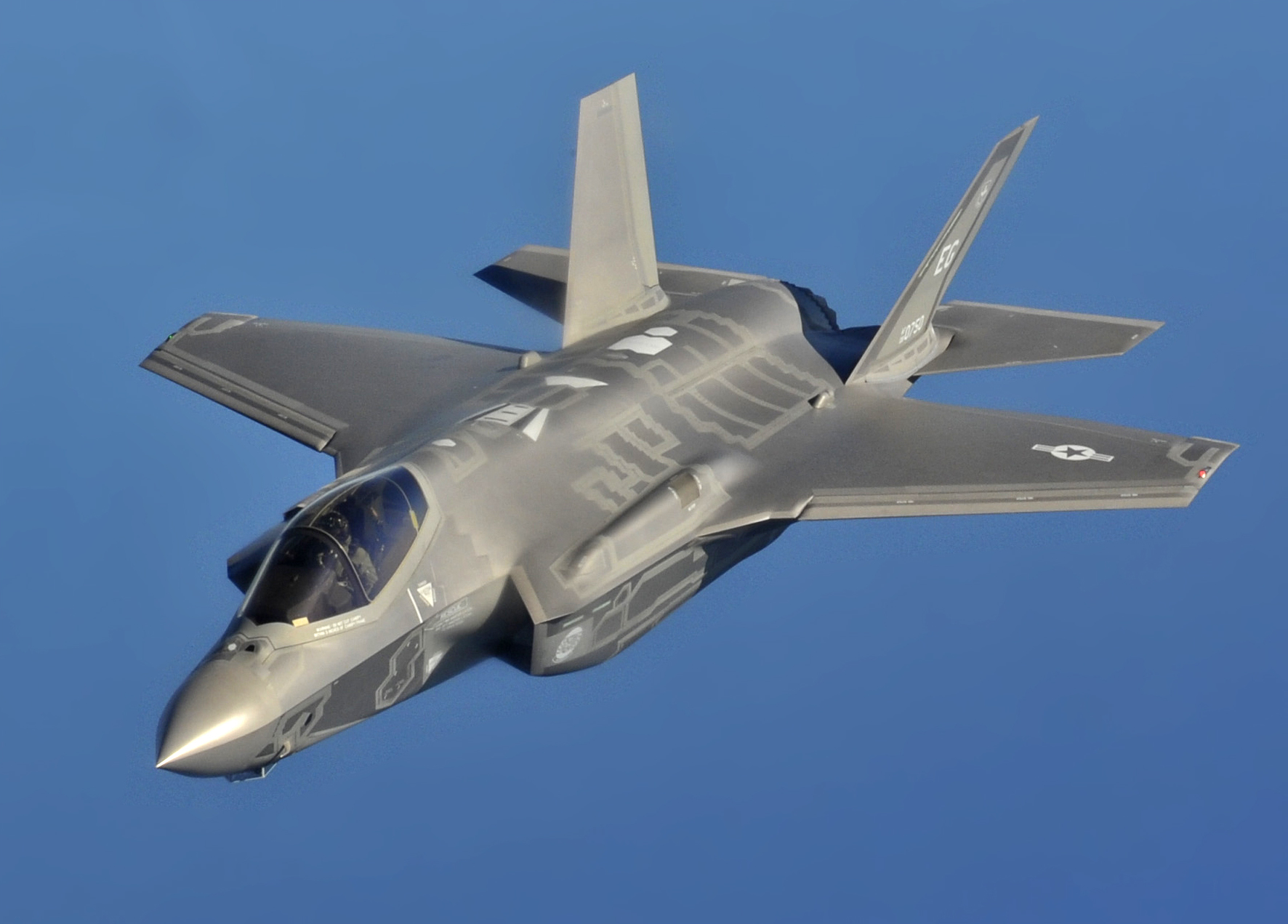
- United States Air Force F-35A (2013)

General information
- Type: Multirole strike fighter
- National origin: United States
- Manufacturer: Lockheed Martin
- Status: In service
- Primary users: US Air Force (USAF): US Navy (USN); US Marine Corps (USMC); See Operators section for others
- Number built: 1,400+ as of 1 November 2026

History
- Manufactured: 2006–present
- Introduction date: F-35B: 31 July 2015 (USMC); F-35A: 2 August 2016 (USAF); F-35C: 28 February 2019 (USN)
- First flight: 15 December 2006; 19 years ago (F-35A)
- Developed from: Lockheed Martin X-35

The Lockheed Martin F-35 Lightning II is an American family of single-seat, single-engine, supersonic stealth strike fighters. A multirole combat aircraft designed for air superiority and strike missions, it also has electronic warfare and intelligence, surveillance, and reconnaissance capabilities. Lockheed Martin is the prime contractor, with partners Northrop Grumman and BAE Systems. The aircraft has three main variants: the conventional takeoff and landing F-35A, the short take-off and vertical-landing F-35B, and the catapult-assisted take-off but arrested recovery F-35C. With 883 aircraft in service as of 2025, it is the world's fourth-most-numerous military aircraft, and most-numerous stealth aircraft.

The aircraft descends from the Lockheed Martin X-35, which in 2001 beat the Boeing X-32 to win the Joint Strike Fighter program, to replace the F-16 Fighting Falcon, F/A-18 Hornet, the McDonnell Douglas AV-8B Harrier II, and others. Development was primarily funded by the United States, with additional funding from select NATO members and Australia; Turkey was removed from the program in 2019. As of April 2026, the US operates all three main variants; both F-35As and F-35Bs are operated by Italy and Japan; F-35As are operated by Australia, Belgium, Denmark, Netherlands, Norway, Poland, and South Korea; and F-35Bs are operated by the United Kingdom. Israel operates its own F-35I variant. Six further NATO members, as well as Switzerland and Singapore, have also placed orders, and other countries are considering purchases.

The program has drawn criticism for its unprecedented size, complexity, ballooning costs, and delayed deliveries, (Note: As of August 2023, the program was 80% over budget and 10 years late.) partially caused by low rate initial production during its development. As of 2024, the program is expected to cost US$2 trillion through 2088, about half of which is due to inflation. The unit flyaway costs of the 296 aircraft in lots 18–19, for which deliveries start in 2026, are $92M for the F-35A, $121.4M for the F-35B, and $110.8M for the F-35C (2026 dollars). Flyaway costs include all the basic marginal costs to produce one aircraft, including the government-furnished jet engines and radars. The F135 engine contributes $20.4 million to this flyaway cost as of 2025.

The F-35 first flew in 2006; its variants entered US service in 2015 (Marine Corps F-35B), 2016 (Air Force F-35A), and 2019 (Navy F-35C). The F-35 first saw combat in the 2018 Israeli strikes in Syria, the F-35B in 2018 by US strikes in Afghanistan, and the F-35C in 2024 in US strikes in Yemen. F-35s have since been used in combat by the US in Iraq, Iran (2025 and 2026), and Venezuela; by Israel in Gaza, Iraq, Iran (2025 and 2026), Lebanon, and Yemen; and by the UK in Iraq and Syria; F-35As can deliver two US B61 nuclear bombs, (Note: The F-35A is only certified to carry the B61 Mod 12 variant, with a maximum yield of 50 kilotons.) including those deployed in the Netherlands and the United Kingdom. Belgium, Germany, Italy, and the UK plan to buy nuclear-capable F-35As. The US plans to buy 2,456 F-35s through 2044, which will represent the bulk of its crewed fixed-wing tactical aviation for several decades; the aircraft is to be a cornerstone of NATO and US-allied air power and operate until 2088.

== Development ==
=== Program origins ===
The F-35 was the product of the Joint Strike Fighter (JSF) program, which was the merger of various combat aircraft programs from the 1980s and 1990s. One progenitor program was the Defense Advanced Research Projects Agency (DARPA) Advanced Short Take-Off/Vertical Landing (ASTOVL), which ran from 1983 to 1994; ASTOVL aimed to develop a Harrier jump jet replacement for the US Marine Corps (USMC) and the UK Royal Navy. Under one of ASTOVL's classified programs, the Supersonic STOVL Fighter (SSF), Lockheed's Skunk Works conducted research for a stealthy supersonic STOVL fighter intended for both US Air Force (USAF) and USMC; among key STOVL technologies explored was the shaft-driven lift fan (SDLF) system. Lockheed's concept was a single-engine canard delta aircraft weighing about 24,000 lb (11,000 kg) empty. ASTOVL was rechristened as the Common Affordable Lightweight Fighter (CALF) in 1993 and involved Lockheed, McDonnell Douglas, and Boeing.

The end of the Cold War and the collapse of the Soviet Union in 1991 caused considerable reductions in Department of Defense (DoD) spending and subsequent restructuring. In 1993, the Joint Advanced Strike Technology (JAST) program emerged following the cancellation of the USAF's Multi-Role Fighter (MRF) and US Navy's (USN) Advanced Attack/Fighter (A/F-X) programs. MRF, a program for a relatively affordable F-16 Fighting Falcon replacement, was scaled back and delayed due to post–Cold War defense posture easing F-16 fleet usage and thus extending its service life as well as increasing budget pressure from the Lockheed Martin F-22 Advanced Tactical Fighter (ATF) program. The A/F-X, initially known as the Advanced-Attack (A-X), began in 1991 as the USN's follow-on to the Advanced Tactical Aircraft (ATA) program for a Grumman A-6 Intruder replacement; the ATA's resulting McDonnell Douglas A-12 Avenger II had been canceled due to technical problems and cost overruns in 1991. In the same year, the termination of the Naval Advanced Tactical Fighter (NATF), a naval development of USAF's ATF program to replace the Grumman F-14 Tomcat, resulted in additional fighter capability being added to A-X, which was then renamed A/F-X. Amid increased budget pressure, the DoD's Bottom-Up Review (BUR) in September 1993 announced MRF's and A/F-X's cancellations, with applicable experience brought to the emerging JAST program. JAST was not meant to develop a new aircraft, but rather to develop requirements, mature technologies, and demonstrate concepts for advanced strike warfare.

As JAST progressed, the need for concept demonstrator aircraft by 1996 emerged, which would coincide with the full-scale flight demonstrator phase of ASTOVL/CALF. Because the ASTOVL/CALF concept appeared to align with the JAST charter, the two programs were eventually merged in 1994 under the JAST name, with the program now serving the USAF, USMC, and USN. JAST was subsequently renamed to Joint Strike Fighter (JSF) in 1995, with STOVL submissions by McDonnell Douglas, Northrop Grumman, Lockheed Martin, (Note: Lockheed acquired General Dynamics fighter division at Fort Worth in 1993 and merged with Martin Marietta in 1995 to form Lockheed Martin.) and Boeing. The JSF was expected to eventually replace large numbers of multi-role and strike fighters in the inventories of the US and its allies, including the Harrier, F-16, F/A-18, Fairchild A-10 Thunderbolt II, and Lockheed F-117 Nighthawk.

International participation is a key aspect of the JSF program, starting with United Kingdom participation in the ASTOVL program. Many international partners requiring modernization of their air forces were interested in the JSF. The United Kingdom joined JAST/JSF as a founding member in 1995 and thus became the only Tier 1 partner of the JSF program; Italy, the Netherlands, Denmark, Norway, Canada, Australia, and Turkey joined the program during the Concept Demonstration Phase (CDP), with Italy and the Netherlands being Tier 2 partners and the rest Tier 3. Consequently, the aircraft was developed in cooperation with international partners and available for export.

=== JSF competition ===
Boeing and Lockheed Martin were selected in early 1997 for CDP, with their concept demonstrator aircraft designated X-32 and X-35, respectively; the McDonnell Douglas team was eliminated, and Northrop Grumman and British Aerospace joined the Lockheed Martin team. Each firm would produce two prototype air vehicles to demonstrate conventional takeoff and landing (CTOL), carrier takeoff and landing (CV), and STOVL. (Note: As these were concept demonstrator aircraft for risk reduction, they did not need to have the internal structure or most subsystems of the final aircraft as a weapon system.) Lockheed Martin's design would make use of the work on the SDLF system conducted under the ASTOVL/CALF program. The key aspect of the X-35 that enabled STOVL operation, the SDLF system consists of the lift fan in the forward center fuselage that could be activated by engaging a clutch that connects the driveshaft to the turbines and thus augmenting the thrust from the engine's swivel nozzle. Research from prior aircraft incorporating similar systems, such as the Convair Model 200, (Note: The F-35 swivel nozzle design was pioneered by the Convair Model 200.) Rockwell XFV-12, and Yakovlev Yak-141, was also taken into consideration. By contrast, Boeing's X-32 employed a direct lift system that the augmented turbofan would be reconfigured to when engaging in STOVL operation.

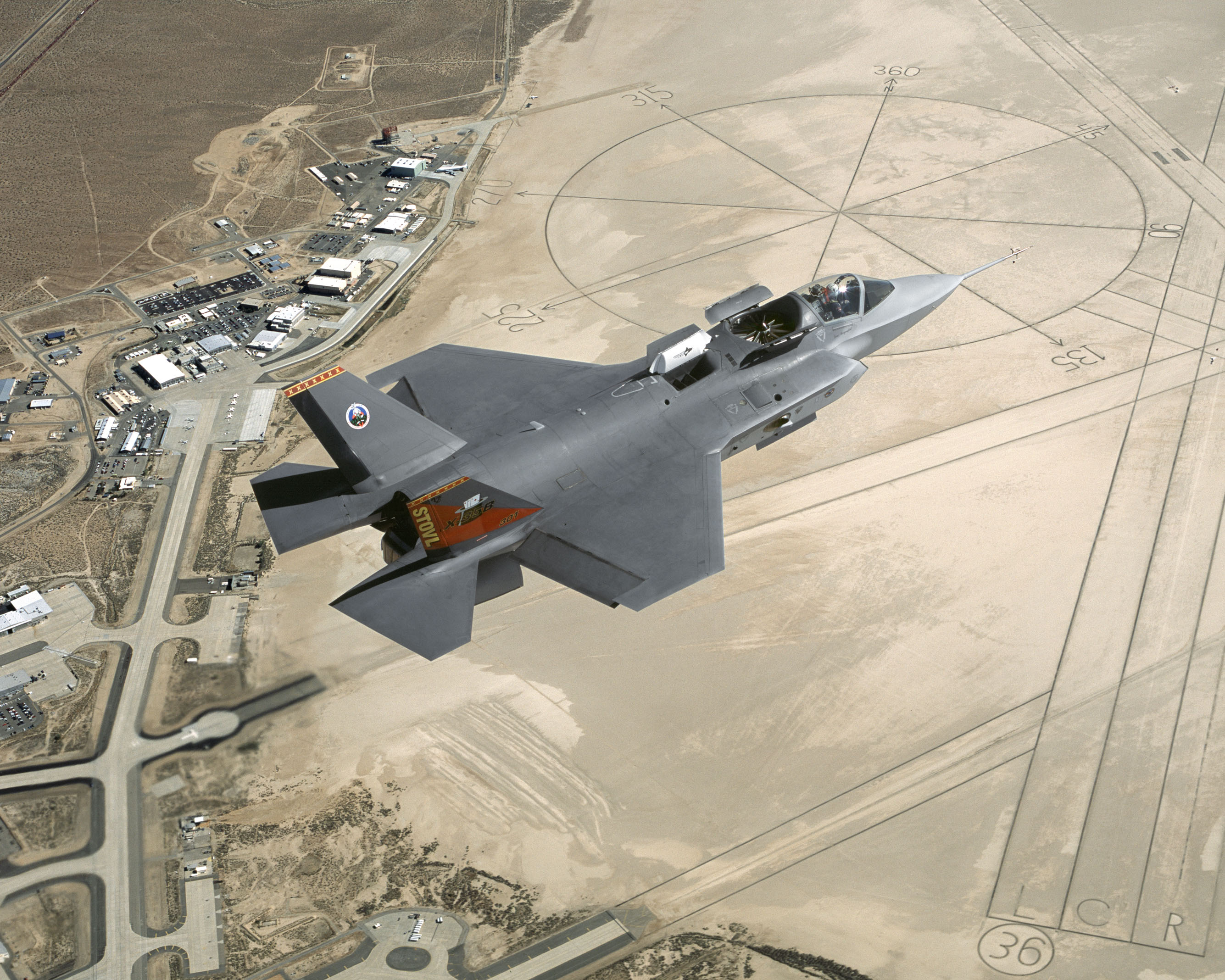
X-35B flying over Edwards Air Force Base

Lockheed Martin's commonality strategy was to replace the STOVL variant's SDLF with a fuel tank and the aft swivel nozzle with a two-dimensional thrust vectoring nozzle for the CTOL variant. (Note: The thrust vectoring nozzle would eventually be replaced by an axisymmetric low-observable nozzle to reduce weight.) STOVL operation is made possible through a patented shaft-driven LiftFan propulsion system. This would enable an identical aerodynamic configuration for the STOVL and CTOL variants, while the CV variant would have an enlarged wing to reduce landing speed for carrier recovery. Due to aerodynamic characteristics and carrier recovery requirements from the JAST merger, the design configuration settled on a conventional tail compared to the canard delta design from the ASTOVL/CALF; notably, the conventional tail configuration offers much lower risk for carrier recovery compared to the ASTOVL/CALF canard configuration, which was designed without carrier compatibility in mind. This enabled greater commonality between all three variants, as the commonality goal was important at this design stage. Lockheed Martin's prototypes would consist of the X-35A for demonstrating CTOL before converting it to the X-35B for STOVL demonstration and the larger-winged X-35C for CV compatibility demonstration.

The X-35A first flew on 24 October 2000 and conducted flight tests for subsonic and supersonic flying qualities, handling, range, and maneuver performance. After 28 flights, the aircraft was then converted into the X-35B for STOVL testing, with key changes including the addition of the SDLF, the three-bearing swivel module (3BSM), and roll-control ducts. The X-35B would successfully demonstrate the SDLF system by performing stable hover, vertical landing, and short takeoff in less than 500 ft (150 m). The X-35C first flew on 16 December 2000 and conducted field landing carrier practice tests.

On 26 October 2001, Lockheed Martin was declared the winner and was awarded the System Development and Demonstration (SDD) contract; Pratt & Whitney was separately awarded a development contract for the F135 engine for the JSF. The F-35 designation, which was out of sequence with standard DoD numbering, was allegedly determined on the spot by program manager Major General Mike Hough; this came as a surprise even to Lockheed Martin, which had expected the F-24 designation for the JSF.

=== Design and production ===
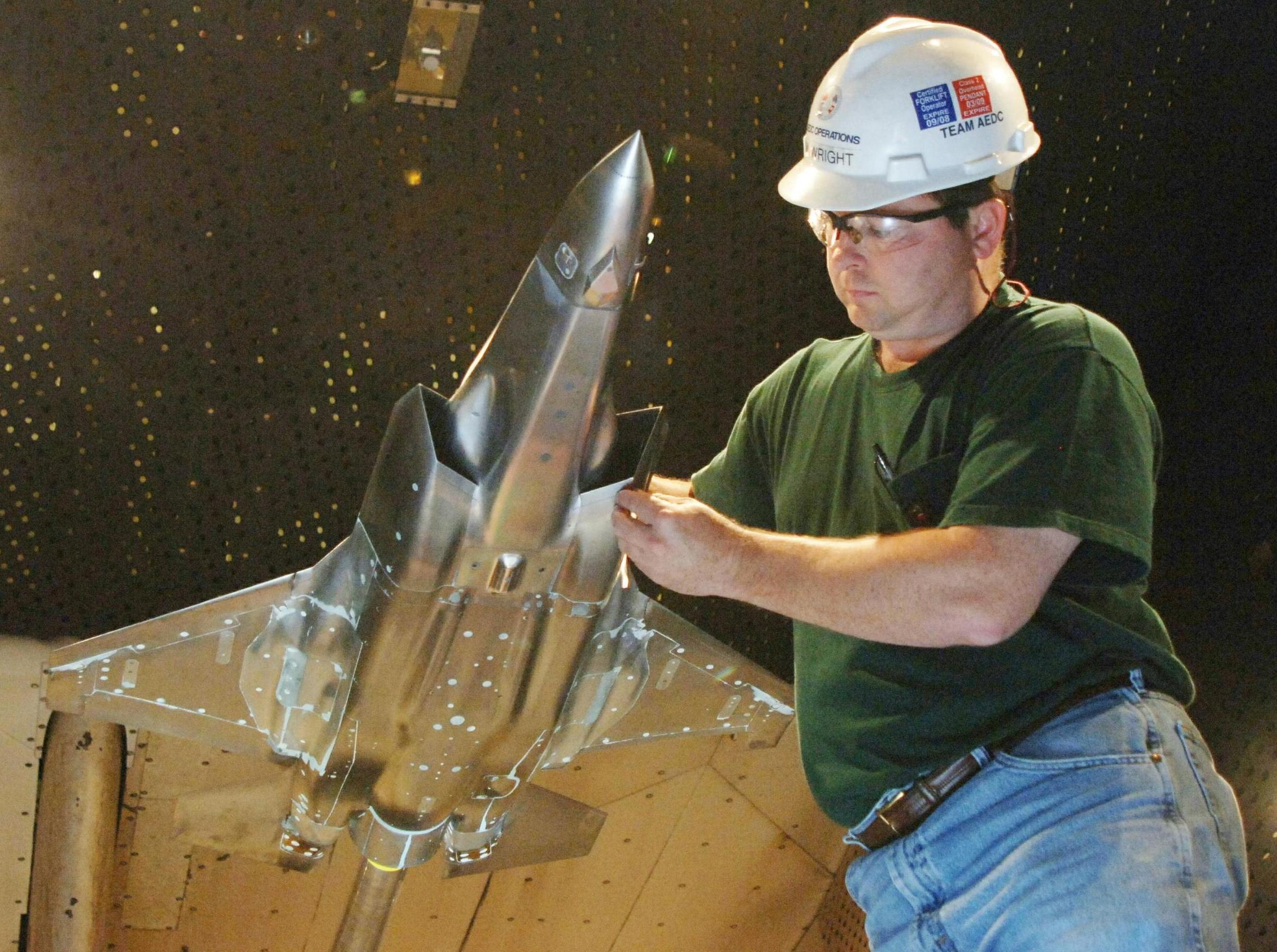
An F-35 wind tunnel testing model in 16-foot (5 m) transonic wind tunnel at the Arnold Engineering Development Center

As the JSF program moved into the System Development and Demonstration phase, the X-35 demonstrator design was modified to create the F-35 combat aircraft. The forward fuselage was lengthened by 5 inches (13 cm) to make room for mission avionics, while the horizontal stabilizers were moved 2 inches (5.1 cm) aft to retain balance and control. The diverterless supersonic inlet changed from a four-sided to a three-sided cowl shape and was moved 30 inches (76 cm) aft. The fuselage section was fuller, the top surface raised by 1 inch (2.5 cm) along the centerline and the lower surface bulged to accommodate weapons bays. Following the designation of the X-35 prototypes, the three variants were designated F-35A (CTOL), F-35B (STOVL), and F-35C (CV), all with a design service life of 8,000 hours. Prime contractor Lockheed Martin performs overall systems integration and final assembly and checkout (FACO) at Air Force Plant 4 in Fort Worth, Texas, (Note: FACO is also performed in Italy and Japan for some partner and export customers as part of the industrial benefits from international cooperation.) while Northrop Grumman and BAE Systems supply components for mission systems and airframe.

Adding the systems of a fighter aircraft added weight. The F-35B gained the most, largely due to a 2003 decision to enlarge the weapons bays for commonality between variants; the total weight growth was reportedly up to 2,200 pounds (1,000 kg), over 8%, causing all STOVL key performance parameter (KPP) thresholds to be missed. In December 2003, the STOVL Weight Attack Team (SWAT) was formed to reduce the weight increase; changes included thinned airframe members, smaller weapons bays and vertical stabilizers, less thrust fed to the roll-post outlets, and redesigning the wing-mate joint, electrical elements, and the airframe immediately aft of the cockpit. The inlet was also revised to accommodate more powerful, greater mass flow engines. Many changes from the SWAT effort were applied to all three variants for commonality. By September 2004, these efforts had reduced the F-35B's weight by over 3,000 pounds (1,400 kg), while the F-35A and F-35C were reduced in weight by 2,400 pounds (1,100 kg) and 1,900 pounds (860 kg), respectively. The weight reduction work cost $6.2 billion and caused an 18-month delay.

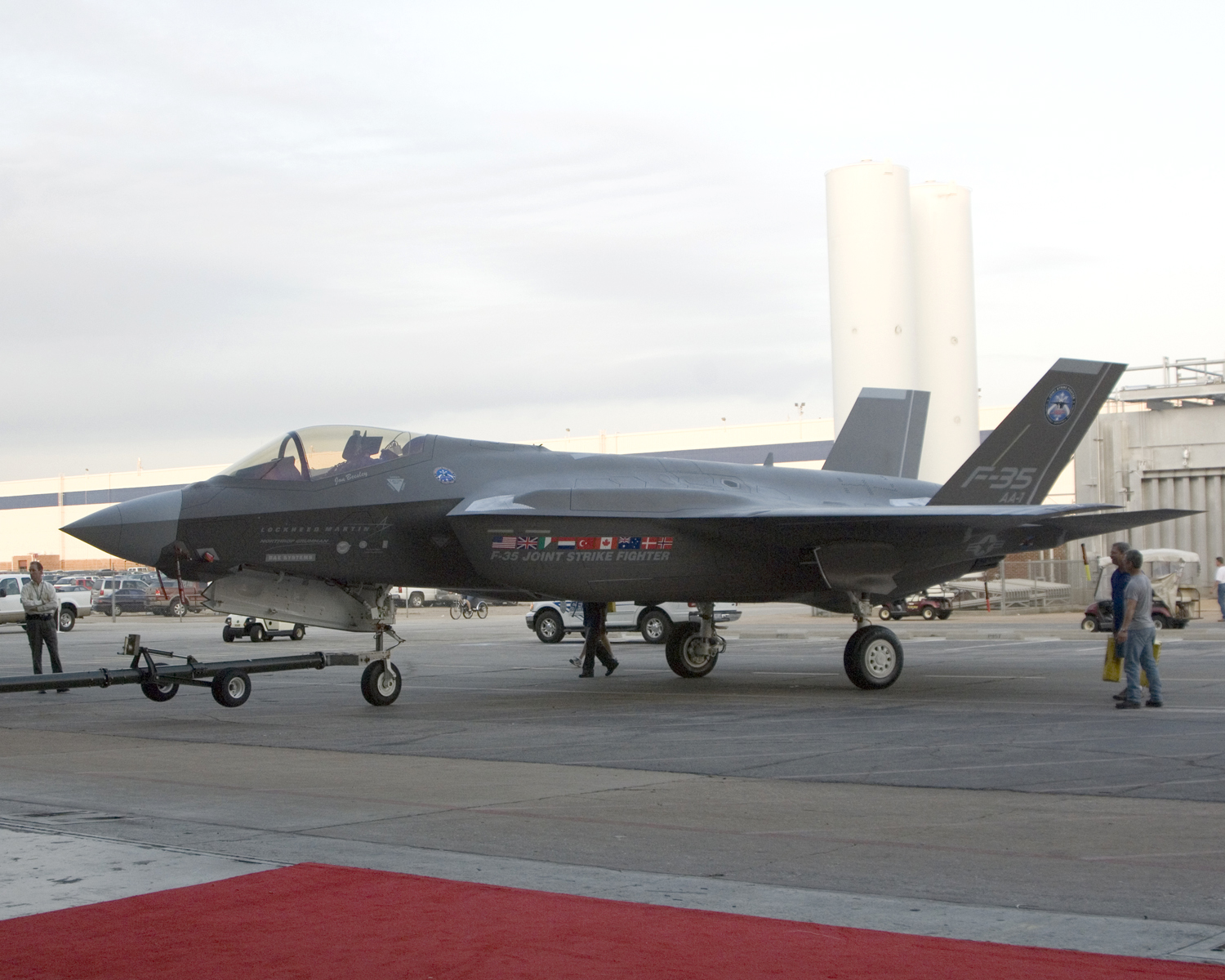
The first F-35A prototype, AA-1, being towed to its inauguration ceremony on 7 July 2006

The first F-35A, designated AA-1, was rolled out at Fort Worth on 19 February 2006 and first flew on 15 December 2006 with chief test pilot Jon S. Beesley at the controls. (Note: This first prototype lacked the weight optimization from SWAT.) In 2006, the F-35 was given the name "Lightning II" in honor of both the Lockheed P-38 Lightning of World War II and the English Electric Lightning. Some USAF pilots have nicknamed the aircraft "Panther" instead, and other nicknames include "Fat Amy" and "Battle Penguin".

The aircraft's software was developed as six releases, or Blocks, for SDD. The first two Blocks, 1A and 1B, readied the F-35 for initial pilot training and multi-level security. Block 2A improved the training capabilities, while 2B was the first combat-ready release planned for the USMC's Initial Operating Capability (IOC). Block 3i retains the capabilities of 2B while having new Technology Refresh 2 (TR-2) hardware and was planned for the USAF's IOC. The final release for SDD, Block 3F, would have full flight envelope and all baseline combat capabilities. Alongside software releases, each block also incorporates avionics hardware updates and air vehicle improvements from flight and structural testing. In what is known as "concurrency", some low rate initial production (LRIP) aircraft lots would be delivered in early Block configurations and eventually upgraded to Block 3F once development is complete. After 17,000 flight test hours, the final flight for the SDD phase was completed in April 2018. Like the F-22, the F-35 has been targeted by cyberattacks and technology theft efforts, as well as potential vulnerabilities in the integrity of the supply chain.

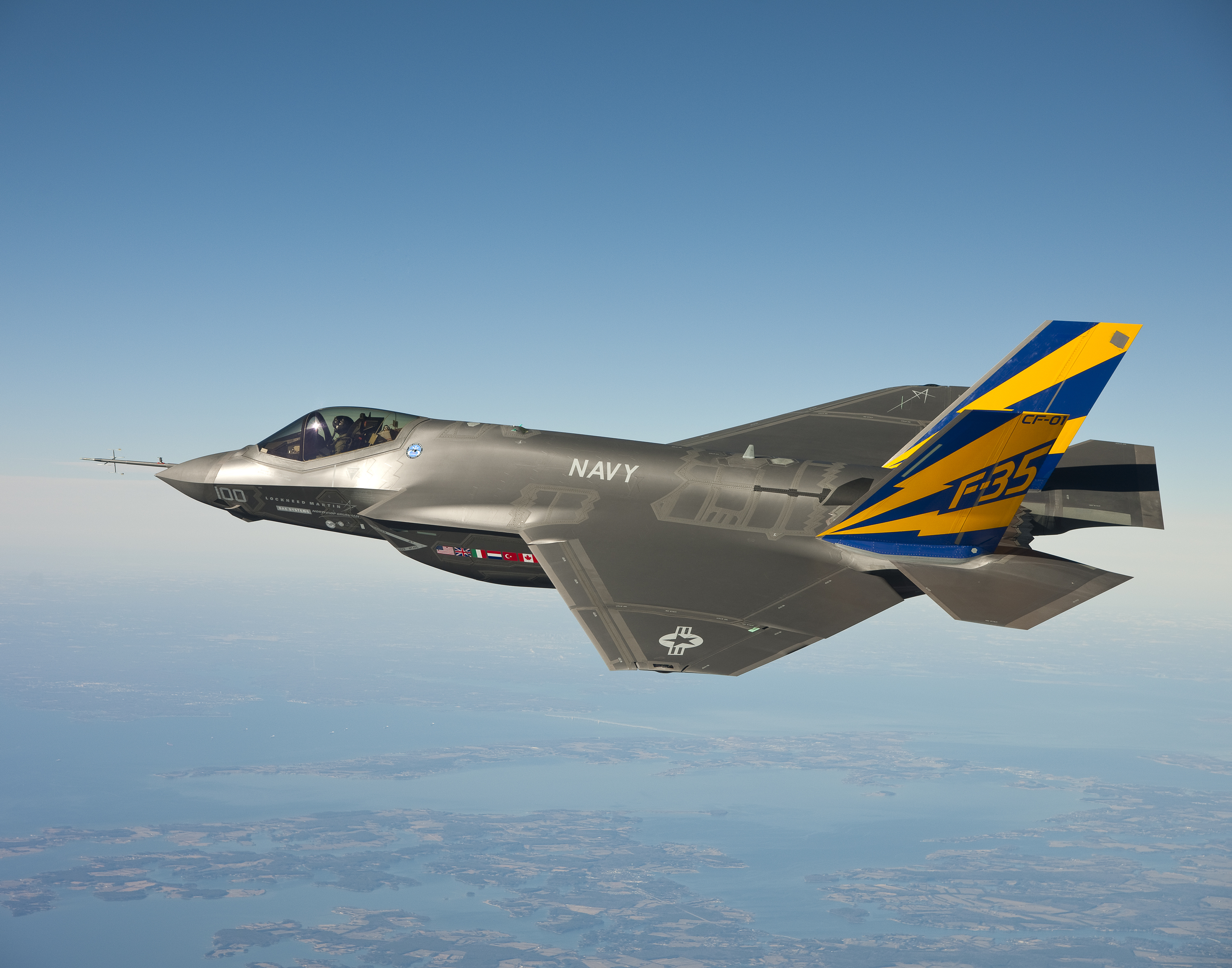
The first F-35C flight sciences aircraft, CF-01, conducts a test flight over the Chesapeake Bay in February 2011.

Testing found several major problems: early F-35B airframes were vulnerable to premature cracking, (Note: Early F-35Bs have a service life as low as 2,100 hours before retrofits as seen on Lot 9 and later aircraft.) the F-35C arrestor hook design was unreliable, fuel tanks were too vulnerable to lightning strikes, the helmet display had problems, and more. Software was repeatedly delayed due to its unprecedented scope and complexity. In 2009, the DoD Joint Estimate Team (JET) estimated that the program was 30 months behind the public schedule. In 2011, the program was "re-baselined"; that is, its cost and schedule goals were changed, pushing the IOC from the planned 2010 to July 2015. The decision to simultaneously test, fix defects, and begin production was criticized as inefficient; in 2014, Under Secretary of Defense for Acquisition Frank Kendall called it "acquisition malpractice". The three variants shared just 25% of their parts, far below the anticipated commonality of 70%.

The program received considerable criticism for cost overruns and for the total projected lifetime cost, as well as quality management shortcomings by contractors. As of August 2023, the program was 80% over budget and 10 years late.

The JSF program was expected to cost about $200 billion for acquisition in base-year 2002 dollars when SDD was awarded in 2001. As early as 2005, the Government Accountability Office (GAO) had identified major program risks in cost and schedule. The costly delays strained the relationship between the Pentagon and contractors. By 2017, delays and cost overruns had pushed the F-35 program's expected acquisition costs to $406.5 billion, with total lifetime cost through 2070 to $1.5 trillion in then-year dollars, which also includes operations and maintenance. By 2024, the lifetime was extended to 2088, and the total lifetime cost was estimated at $2.1 trillion, about half of which was due to inflation.

The F-35A's unit cost (not including engine) for LRIP Lot 13 was $79.2 million in base-year 2012 dollars. Delays in development and operational test and evaluation, including integration into the Joint Simulation Environment, pushed the full-rate production decision from the end of 2019 to March 2024, although actual production rate had already approached the full rate by 2020; the combined full rate at the Fort Worth, Italy, and Japan FACO plants is 156 aircraft annually.

=== Upgrades and further development ===
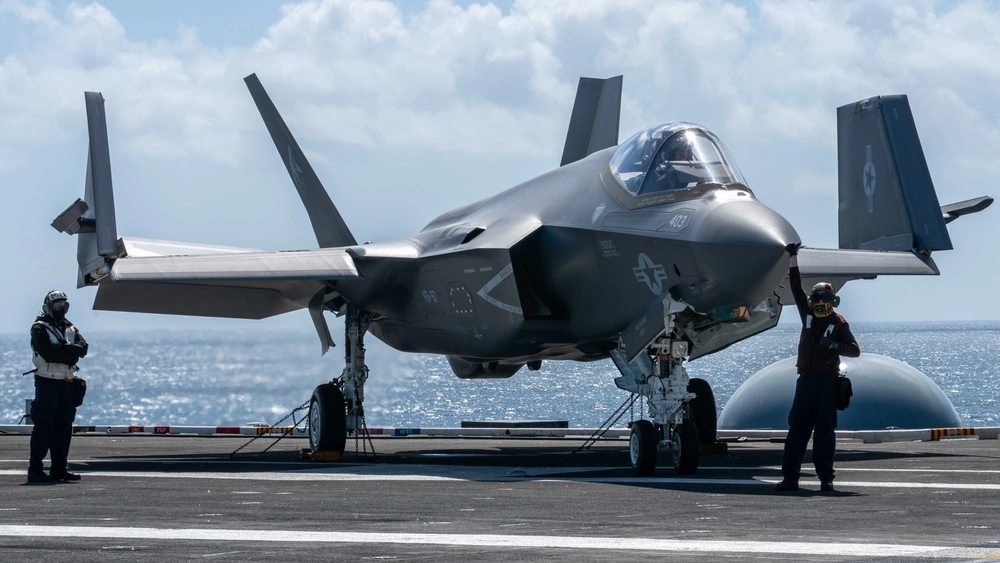
Sailors prepare to taxi an F-35C Lightning II on aircraft carrier USS Carl Vinson.

The F-35 is expected to be continually upgraded over its lifetime. The first combat-capable Block 2B configuration, which had basic air-to-air and strike capabilities, was declared ready by the USMC in July 2015. The Block 3F configuration began operational test and evaluation (OT&E) in December 2018, and its completion in late 2023 concluded SDD in March 2024. The F-35 program is also conducting sustainment and upgrade development, with early aircraft from LRIP lot 2 onwards gradually upgraded to the baseline Block 3F standard by 2021.

With Block 3F as the final build for SDD, the first major upgrade program is Block 4, which began development in 2019 and was initially captured under the Continuous Capability Development and Delivery (C2D2) program. Block 4 is expected to enter service in incremental steps from the late 2020s to early 2030s and integrates additional weapons, including those unique to international customers, improved sensor capabilities including the new AN/APG-85 AESA radar and additional ESM bandwidth, and adds Remotely Operated Video Enhanced Receiver (ROVER) support. C2D2 also places greater emphasis on agile software development to enable quicker releases.

The key enabler of Block 4 is Technology Refresh 3 (TR-3) avionics hardware, which consists of new display, core processor, and memory modules to support increased processing requirements, as well as an engine upgrade that increases the amount of cooling available to support the additional mission systems. The engine upgrade effort explored both improvements to the F135 as well as significantly more power and efficient adaptive cycle engines. In 2018, General Electric and Pratt & Whitney were awarded contracts to develop adaptive cycle engines for potential application in the F-35, (Note: Adaptive cycle engine technology had been under development under Air Force Life Cycle Management Center's (AFLCMC) Adaptive Engine Transition Program (AETP) and its precursors.) and in 2022, the F-35 Adaptive Engine Replacement program was launched to integrate them. However, in 2023 the USAF chose an improved F135 under the Engine Core Upgrade (ECU) program over an adaptive cycle engine due to cost as well as concerns over risk of integrating the new engine, initially designed for the F-35A, on the B and C. Difficulties with the new TR-3 hardware, including regression testing, have caused delays to Block 4 as well as a halt in aircraft deliveries from July 2023 to July 2024.

In 2023, the GAO raised concerns in two reports that the estimated cost of the Block 4 upgrade has increased from $10.6 billion to $16.5 billion and completion of the upgrade is delayed from 2026 to 2029 at the earliest. In September 2025, it was announced that the Block 4 upgrade would be truncated and delayed due to technological uncertainties and engine upgrade delays, among other reasons. Critical changes that do not require an upgraded engine will remain in Block 4 and be ready by 2031 at the earliest. Upgrades that were originally planned for Block 4, but require the upgraded engine, or lack technological maturity, will be deferred to currently undefined efforts expected in the mid-2030s. Block 4 was originally intended to be completed in 2026.

Defense contractors have offered upgrades to the F-35 outside of official program contracts. In 2013, Northrop Grumman disclosed its development of a directional infrared countermeasures suite, named Threat Nullification Defensive Resource (ThNDR). The countermeasure system would share the same space as the Distributed Aperture System (DAS) sensors and act as a laser missile jammer to protect against infrared-homing missiles.

The F-35 is consistently one of the most expensive weapons systems in the US military budget. It was the second-most expensive system funded in the 2025 budget, at $13.3 billion, behind the Virginia-class submarine at $13.9 billion. It was also the most expensive system in the 2026 budget request, at $13.1 billion.

Israel operates a unique subvariant of the F-35A, designated the F-35I, that is designed to better interface with and incorporate Israeli equipment and weapons. The Israeli Air Force also has their own F-35I test aircraft that provides more access to the core avionics to include their own equipment.

In June 2026, the US GAO released the report "F-35 Sustainment: Actions Needed to Ensure Updated Strategy Improves Persistent Readiness Challenges". The report found that F-35 fleet readiness had continued to decline despite years of investment. Fleetwide Full Mission Capable rates fell from 38 percent in fiscal year 2021 to approximately 25 percent in fiscal year 2025, while Mission Capable rates declined from 67 percent to 44 percent over the same period. The GAO identified spare parts shortages, insufficient maintenance and depot capacity, engine sustainment issues, and supply chain problems as the main contributing factors. It noted that the Department of Defense launched a $13.7 billion sustainment strategy in 2025 intended to improve readiness through 2030, but warned that the plan faces significant implementation risks and its long-term effectiveness remains uncertain.

=== Procurement and international participation ===
The United States is the primary customer and financial backer, with planned procurement of 1,763 F-35As for the USAF, 353 F-35Bs and 67 F-35Cs for the USMC, and 273 F-35Cs for the USN. Additionally, the United Kingdom, Italy, the Netherlands, Turkey, Australia, Norway, Denmark and Canada have agreed to contribute US$4.375 billion towards development costs, with the United Kingdom contributing about 10% of the planned development costs as the sole Tier 1 partner. Britain supplies ejector seats, rear fuselage, active interceptor systems, targeting lasers and weapon release cables, mainly through British Aerospace, amounting to 15% of the value of the F-35, and is the largest supplier of spare parts for the jet after the US. The initial plan was that the US and eight major partner countries would acquire over 3,100 F-35s through 2035. The three tiers of international participation generally reflect financial stake in the program, the amount of technology transfer and subcontracts open for bid by national companies, and the order in which countries can obtain production aircraft. Alongside program partner countries, Israel and Singapore have joined as Security Cooperative Participants (SCP). Sales to SCP and non-partner states, including Belgium, Japan, and South Korea, are made through the Pentagon's Foreign Military Sales program. Turkey was removed from the F-35 program in July 2019 over security concerns following its purchase of a Russian S-400 surface-to-air missile system. (Note: Turkey was the sole supplier of several F-35 parts, thus forcing the program to find replacement vendors.) The unit flyaway costs of the 296 aircraft in lots 18–19, for which deliveries start in 2026, are $92M for the F-35A, $121.4M for the F-35B, and $110.8M for the F-35C (2026 dollars). Flyaway costs include all the basic marginal costs to produce one aircraft, including the government-furnished jet engines and radars (Government Furnished Equipment, or GFE, is purchased directly by the government and provided to Lockheed Martin for final assembly). The cost of the F135 engine is $20.4 million for lot 18. Lockheed Martin delivered a record 191 F-35 Lightning II fighter jets in 2025, bringing the global fleet to approximately 1,300 aircraft.

== Design ==
=== Overview ===
The F-35 is a family of single-engine, supersonic, stealth, multirole strike fighters. The second fifth-generation fighter to enter US service and the first operational supersonic STOVL stealth fighter, the F-35 emphasizes low observables, advanced avionics, and sensor fusion that enable a high level of situational awareness and long range lethality; the USAF considers the aircraft its primary strike fighter for conducting suppression of enemy air defense (SEAD) and air interdiction missions, owing to the advanced sensors and mission systems.

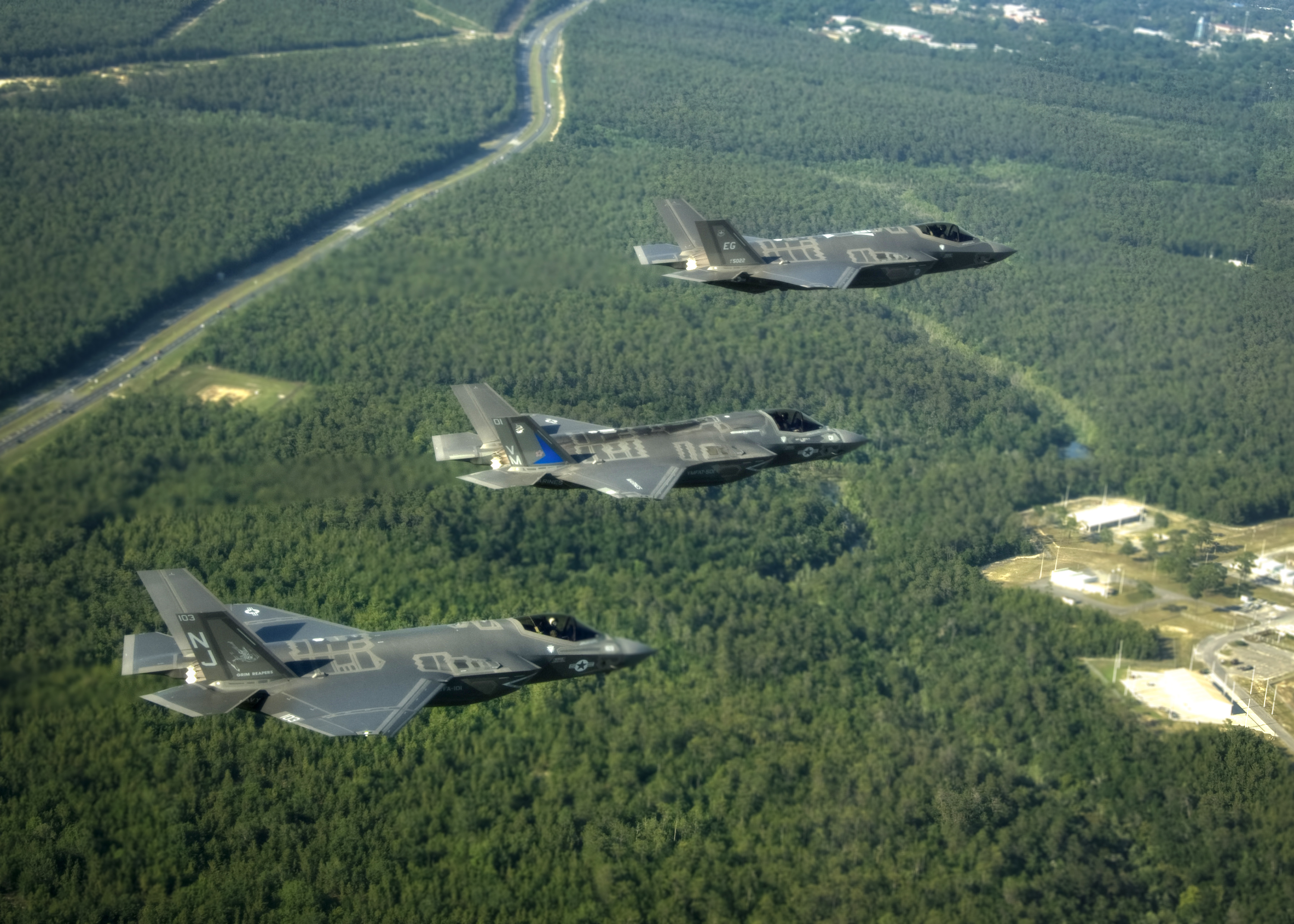
(From the top) F-35A of the 33rd FW, F-35B of VMFAT-501 and F-35C of VFA-101 near Eglin AFB, 2014

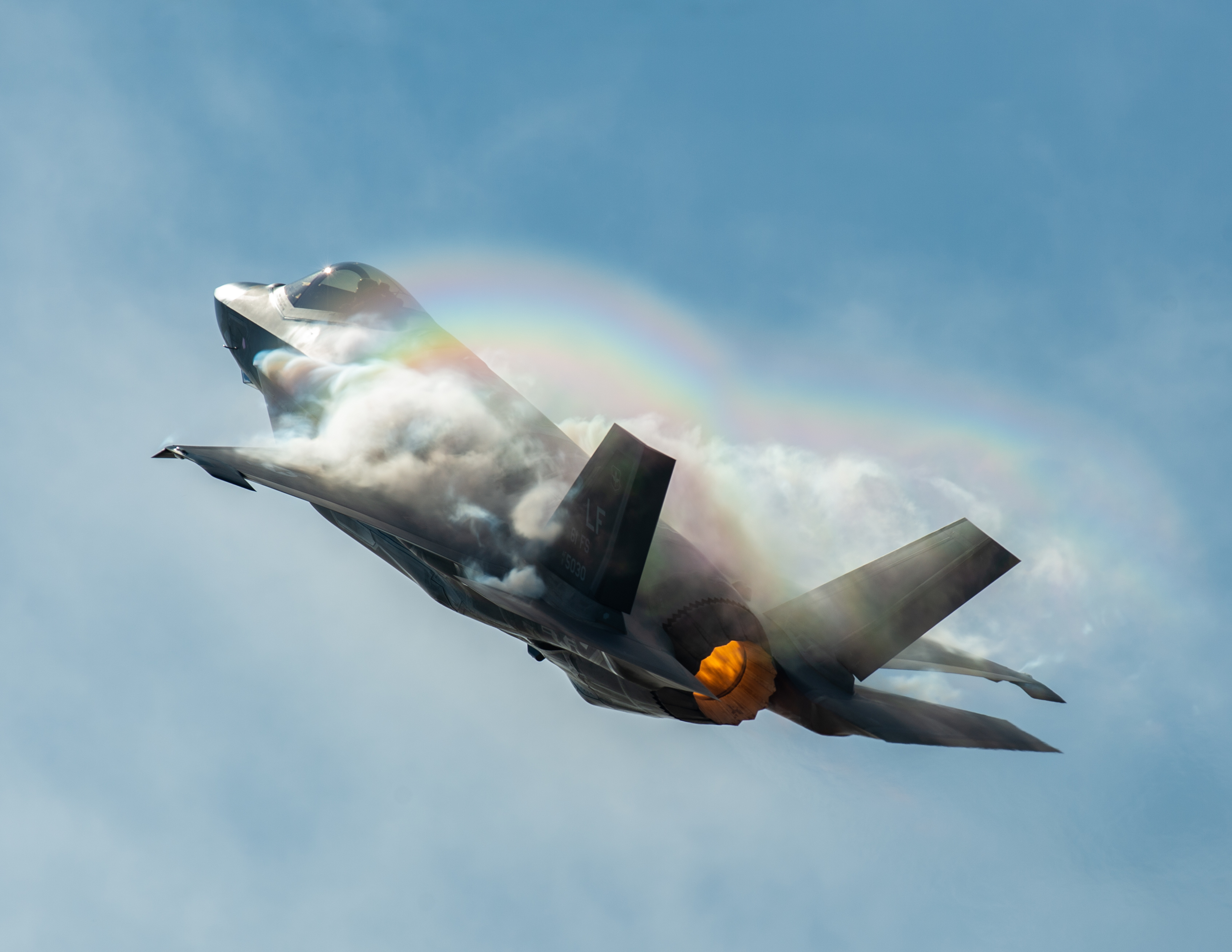
A vortex forms around the body of the aircraft

The F-35 has a wing-tail configuration with two vertical stabilizers canted for stealth. Flight control surfaces include leading-edge flaps, flaperons, (Note: The F-35C has additional ailerons at the folding sections of the wings.) rudders, and all-moving horizontal tails (stabilators); leading edge root extensions or chines also run forward to the inlets. The relatively short 35-foot wingspan of the F-35A and F-35B is set by the requirement to fit inside USN amphibious assault ship parking areas and elevators; the F-35C's larger wing is more fuel efficient. The fixed diverterless supersonic inlets (DSI) use a bumped compression surface and forward-swept cowl to shed the boundary layer of the forebody away from the inlets, which form a Y-duct for the engine. Structurally, the F-35 drew upon lessons from the F-22; composites comprise 35% of airframe weight, with the majority being bismaleimide and composite epoxy materials as well as some carbon nanotube-reinforced epoxy in later production lots. The F-35 is considerably heavier than the lightweight fighters it replaces, with the lightest variant having an empty weight of 29,300 lb (13,300 kg); much of the weight can be attributed to the internal weapons bays and the extensive avionics carried. Each F-35 contains about 50 pounds (23 kg) of samarium magnets.

While lacking the kinematic performance of the larger twin-engine F-22, the F-35 is competitive with fourth-generation fighters such as the F-16 and F/A-18, especially when they carry weapons because the F-35's internal weapons bay eliminates drag from external stores. All variants have a top speed of Mach 1.6 (1,220 mph; 1,960 km/h), attainable with full internal payload. The Pratt & Whitney F135 engine gives good subsonic acceleration and energy, with supersonic dash in afterburner. The F-35, while not a "supercruising" aircraft, can fly at Mach 1.2 (913 mph; 1,470 km/h) for a dash of 150 miles (240 km) without afterburner. This ability can be useful in battlefield situations. The large stabilators, leading edge extensions and flaps, and canted rudders provide excellent high alpha (angle-of-attack) characteristics, with a trimmed alpha of 50°. Relaxed stability and triplex-redundant fly-by-wire controls provide excellent handling qualities and departure resistance. Having over double the F-16's internal fuel, the F-35 has a considerably greater combat radius, while stealth also enables a more efficient mission flight profile.

The F-35A serves as a central nuclear weapons delivery vehicle for US nuclear sharing in NATO countries, with associated USAF munitions squadrons armed with B61 Mod 12 nuclear bombs. As of 2026, these F-35A missions are active in the Netherlands at Volkel Air Base, and potentially also a USAF mission in the United Kingdom at RAF Lakenheath. Belgium, Italy, and Germany, which also host US nuclear weapons, plan to replace their nuclear-capable aircraft with F-35As. As of 2023, Kleine Brogel Air Base in Belgium operates F-16s, and Ghedi Air Base in Italy and Büchel Air Base in Germany operate Panavia Tornado PA-200s, while Aviano Air Base in Italy hosts US F-16s. The UK's Royal Air Force also plans to operate its own nuclear sharing mission, procuring F-35As to be based at RAF Marham.

=== Sensors and avionics ===
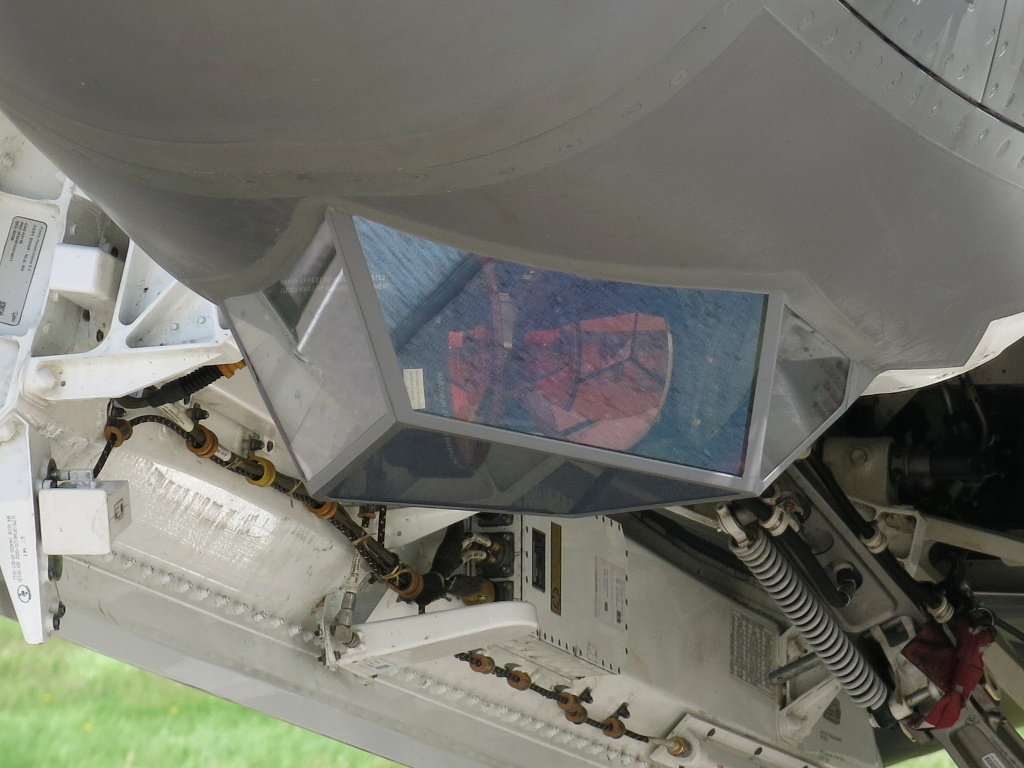
The AN/AAQ-40 Electro-Optical Target System (EOTS) under the nose of an F-35A

The F-35's mission systems are among the most complex aspects of the aircraft. The avionics and sensor fusion are designed to improve the pilot's situational awareness and command-and-control capabilities and facilitate network-centric warfare. Key sensors include the Northrop Grumman AN/APG-81 active electronically scanned array (AESA) radar; BAE Systems AN/ASQ-239 Barracuda electronic warfare system; Northrop Grumman/Raytheon AN/AAQ-37 Electro-optical Distributed Aperture System (DAS); Lockheed Martin AN/AAQ-40 Electro-Optical Targeting System (EOTS); and Northrop Grumman AN/ASQ-242 Communications, Navigation, and Identification (CNI) suite. The F-35 was designed for its sensors to work together to provide a cohesive image of the local battlespace; for example, the APG-81 radar also acts as part of the electronic warfare system.

Much of the F-35's software was developed in C and C++ programming languages, while Ada83 code from the F-22 was also used; the Block 3F software has 8.6 million lines of code. The Green Hills Software Integrity DO-178B real-time operating system (RTOS) runs on integrated core processors (ICPs); data networking includes the IEEE 1394b and Fibre Channel buses. The avionics use commercial off-the-shelf (COTS) components when practical to make upgrades cheaper and more flexible; for example, to enable fleet software upgrades for the software-defined radio (SDR) systems. The mission systems software, particularly for sensor fusion, was one of the program's most difficult parts and responsible for substantial program delays. (Note: In 2014, Michael Gilmore, Director of Operational Test & Evaluation, stated that "software development, integration in the contractor labs, and delivery of mature capability to flight test continued to be behind schedule.")

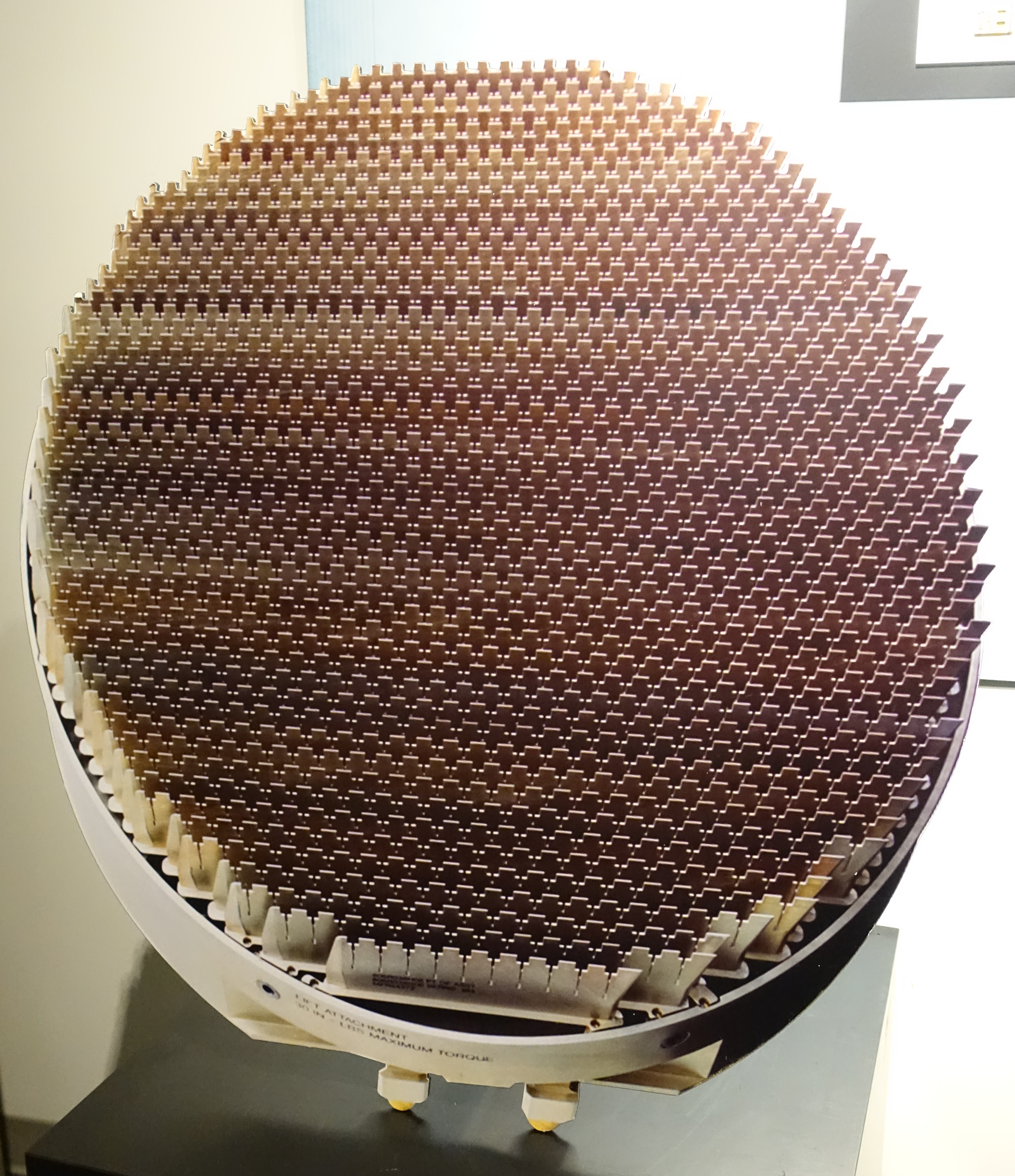
AN/APG-81 AESA radar antenna

The APG-81 radar uses electronic scanning for rapid beam agility and incorporates passive and active air-to-air modes, strike modes, and synthetic aperture radar (SAR) capability, with multiple target track-while-scan at ranges in excess of 80 nmi (150 km). The antenna is tilted backward for stealth. Complementing the radar is the AAQ-37 DAS: six infrared sensors that can track targets and warn of approaching missiles all around the aircraft; it acts as a situational-awareness infrared search and track (SAIRST) and feeds spherical infrared and night-vision imagery to the helmet visor. The ASQ-239 Barracuda electronic warfare system has ten radio frequency antennas embedded into the edges of the wing and tail for all-aspect radar warning receiver (RWR). It also provides sensor fusion of radio frequency and infrared tracking functions, geolocation threat targeting, and multispectral image countermeasures for self-defense against missiles. The electronic warfare system can detect and jam hostile radars. The AAQ-40 EOTS is mounted behind a faceted low-observable window under the nose and performs laser targeting, forward-looking infrared (FLIR), and long-range IRST functions. The ASQ-242 CNI suite uses a half dozen physical links, including the directional Multifunction Advanced Data Link (MADL), for covert CNI functions. Information from radio frequency receivers and infrared sensors is combined to form a single tactical picture for the pilot. The all-aspect target direction and identification can be shared via MADL to other platforms without compromising low observability, while Link 16 enables communication with older systems.

The F-35 was designed to accept upgrades to its processors, sensors, and software. Technology Refresh 3, which includes a new core processor and a new cockpit display, is planned for Lot 15 aircraft. Lockheed Martin has offered the Advanced EOTS for the Block 4 configuration; the improved sensor fits into the same area as the baseline EOTS with minimal changes. In June 2018, Lockheed Martin picked Raytheon for improved DAS. The USAF has studied the potential for the F-35 to orchestrate attacks by unmanned combat aerial vehicles (UCAVs) via its sensors and communications equipment.

A new radar called the AN/APG-85 is planned for Block 4 F-35s. According to the JPO, the new radar will be compatible with all three major F-35 variants. However, it is unclear if older aircraft will be retrofitted with the new radar.

=== Stealth and signatures ===
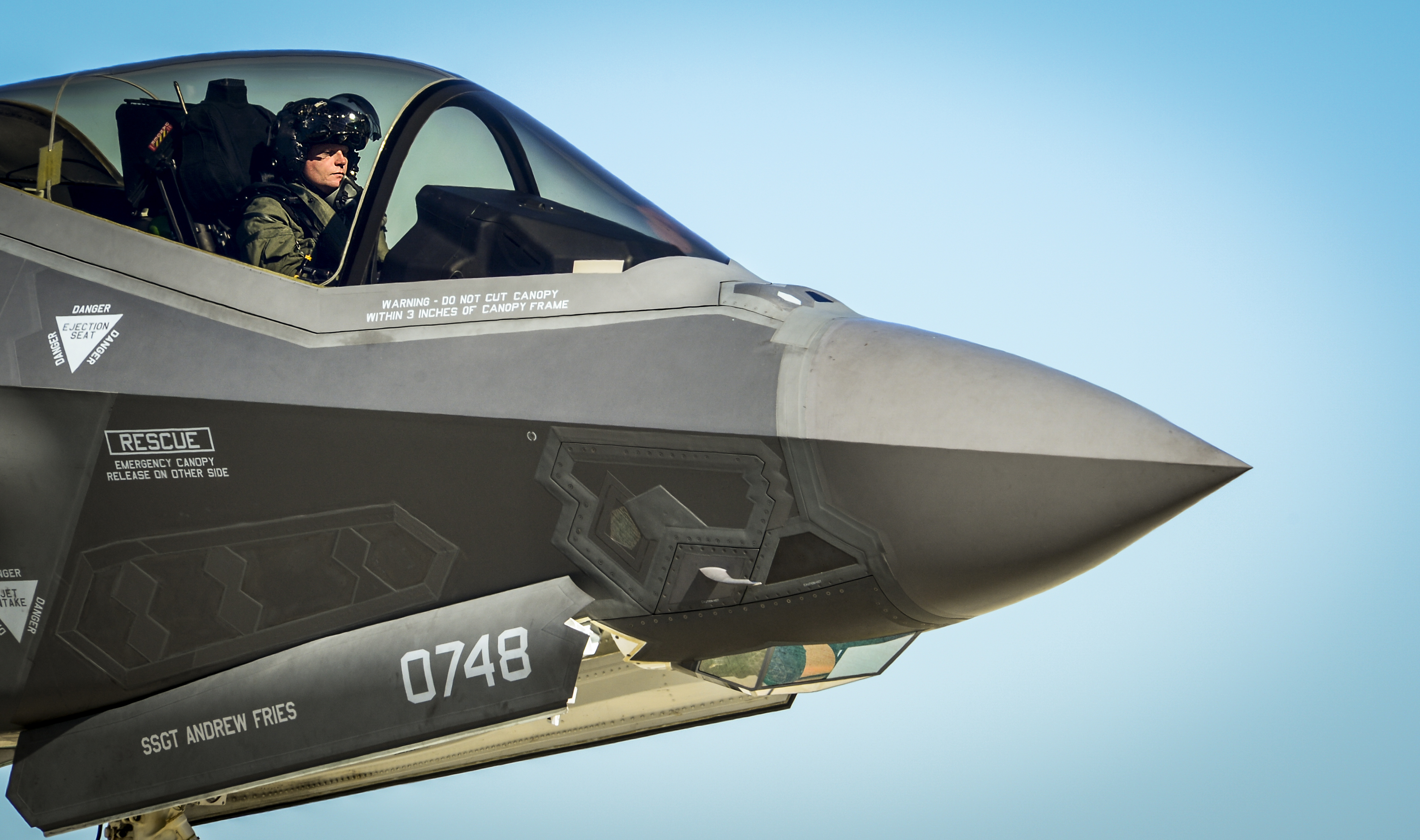
The sawtooth design on the landing gear door and access panels

Stealth is a key aspect of the F-35's design, and radar cross-section (RCS) is minimized through careful shaping of the airframe and the use of radar-absorbent materials (RAM); visible measures to reduce RCS include alignment of edges and continuous curvature of surfaces, serration of skin panels, and the masking of the engine face and turbine. Additionally, the F-35's diverterless supersonic inlet (DSI) uses a compression bump and forward-swept cowl rather than a splitter gap or bleed system to divert the boundary layer away from the inlet duct, eliminating the diverter cavity and further reducing radar signature. The RCS of the F-35 has been characterized as lower than a metal golf ball at certain frequencies and angles; in some conditions, the F-35 compares favorably to the F-22 in stealth. For maintainability, the F-35's stealth design took lessons from earlier stealth aircraft such as the F-22; the F-35's radar-absorbent fibermat skin is more durable and requires less maintenance than older topcoats. The aircraft also has reduced infrared and visual signatures, as well as strict controls of radio frequency emitters to prevent their detection. The F-35's stealth design is primarily focused on high-frequency X-band wavelengths; low-frequency radars can spot stealthy aircraft due to Rayleigh scattering, but such radars are also conspicuous, susceptible to clutter, and lack precision. To disguise its RCS, the aircraft can mount four Luneburg lens reflectors. Overseas deployments of the F-35, including in Estonia, Bulgaria, and South Korea, use these radar reflectors to prevent Russian and Chinese intelligence gathering on the true RCS signature. There were concerns that Russian involvement in the Syrian civil war allowed the country to gather true RCS data on Israeli F-35Is flying without reflectors over Lebanon, as well as US F-22s.

Noise from the F-35 caused concerns in residential areas near potential bases for the aircraft, and residents near two such bases—Luke Air Force Base, Arizona, and Eglin Air Force Base (AFB), Florida—requested environmental impact studies in 2008 and 2009, respectively. Although the noise levels, in decibels, were comparable to those of prior fighters such as the F-16, the F-35's sound power is stronger—particularly at lower frequencies. Subsequent surveys and studies have indicated that the noise of the F-35 was not perceptibly different from the F-16 and F/A-18E/F, though the greater low-frequency noise was noticeable for some observers.

=== Cockpit ===
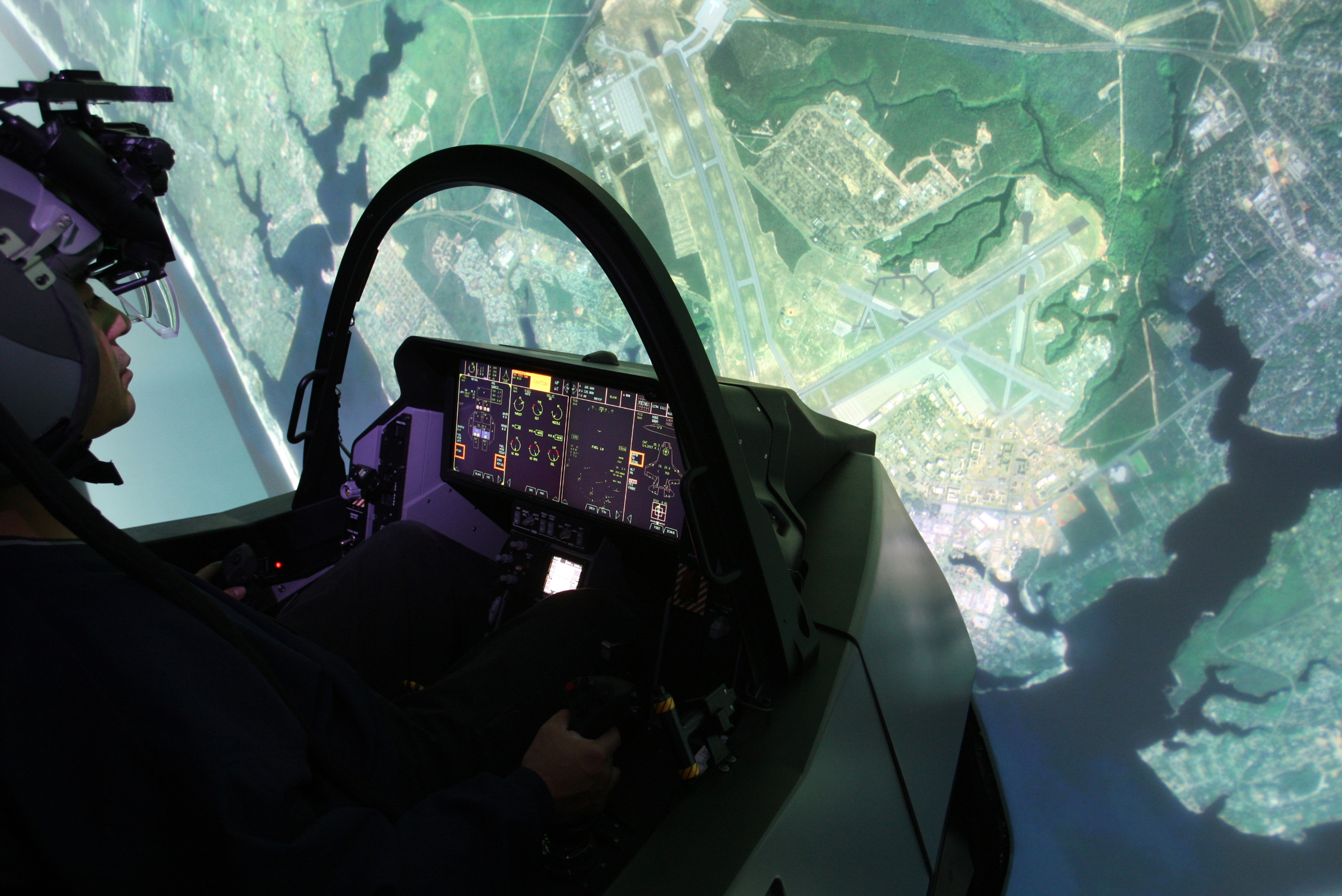
F-35 cockpit simulator

The glass cockpit was designed to give the pilot good situational awareness. The main display is a 20-by-8-inch (50 by 20 cm) panoramic touchscreen, which shows flight instruments, stores management, CNI information, and integrated caution and warnings; the pilot can customize the arrangement of the information. Below the main display is a smaller stand-by display. The cockpit has a speech-recognition system developed by Adacel. The F-35 does not have a head-up display; instead, flight and combat information is displayed on the visor of the pilot's helmet in a helmet-mounted display system (HMDS). The one-piece tinted canopy is hinged at the front and has an internal frame for structural strength. The Martin-Baker US16E ejection seat is launched by a twin-catapult system housed on side rails. There is a right-hand side stick and throttle hands-on throttle-and-stick system. For life support, an onboard oxygen-generation system (OBOGS) is fitted and powered by the Integrated Power Package (IPP), with an auxiliary oxygen bottle and backup oxygen system for emergencies.

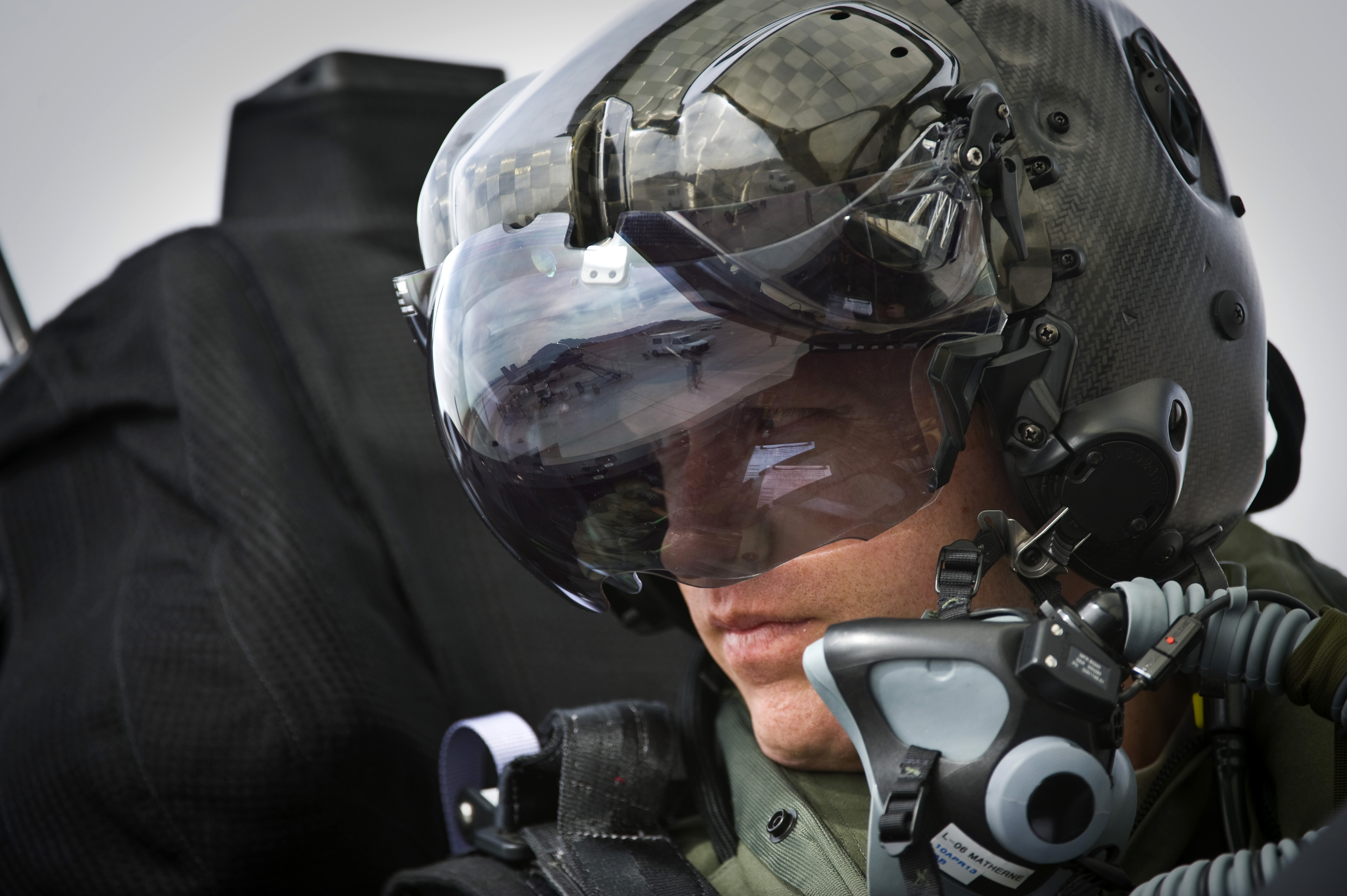
The F-35's helmet-mounted display system

The Vision Systems International (Note: Rockwell Collins and Elbit Systems formed the joint venture Vision Systems International (VSI), later renamed Collins Elbit Vision Systems (CEVS).) helmet display is a key piece of the F-35's human-machine interface. Instead of the head-up display mounted atop the dashboard of earlier fighters, the HMDS puts flight and combat information on the helmet visor, allowing the pilot to see it no matter which way they are facing. Infrared and night vision imagery from the Distributed Aperture System can be displayed directly on the HMDS and enables the pilot to "see through" the aircraft. The HMDS allows an F-35 pilot to fire missiles at targets even when the nose of the aircraft is pointing elsewhere by cuing missile seekers at high angles off-boresight. Each helmet costs $400,000. The HMDS weighs more than traditional helmets, and there is concern that it can endanger lightweight pilots during ejection.

Due to the HMDS's vibration, jitter, night-vision and sensor display problems during development, Lockheed Martin and Elbit issued a draft specification in 2011 for an alternative HMDS based on the AN/AVS-9 night vision goggles as backup, with BAE Systems chosen later that year. A cockpit redesign would be needed to adopt an alternative HMDS. Following progress on the baseline helmet, development on the alternative HMDS was halted in October 2013. In 2016, the Gen 3 helmet with improved night vision camera, new liquid crystal displays, automated alignment and software enhancements was introduced with LRIP lot 7.

=== Armament ===
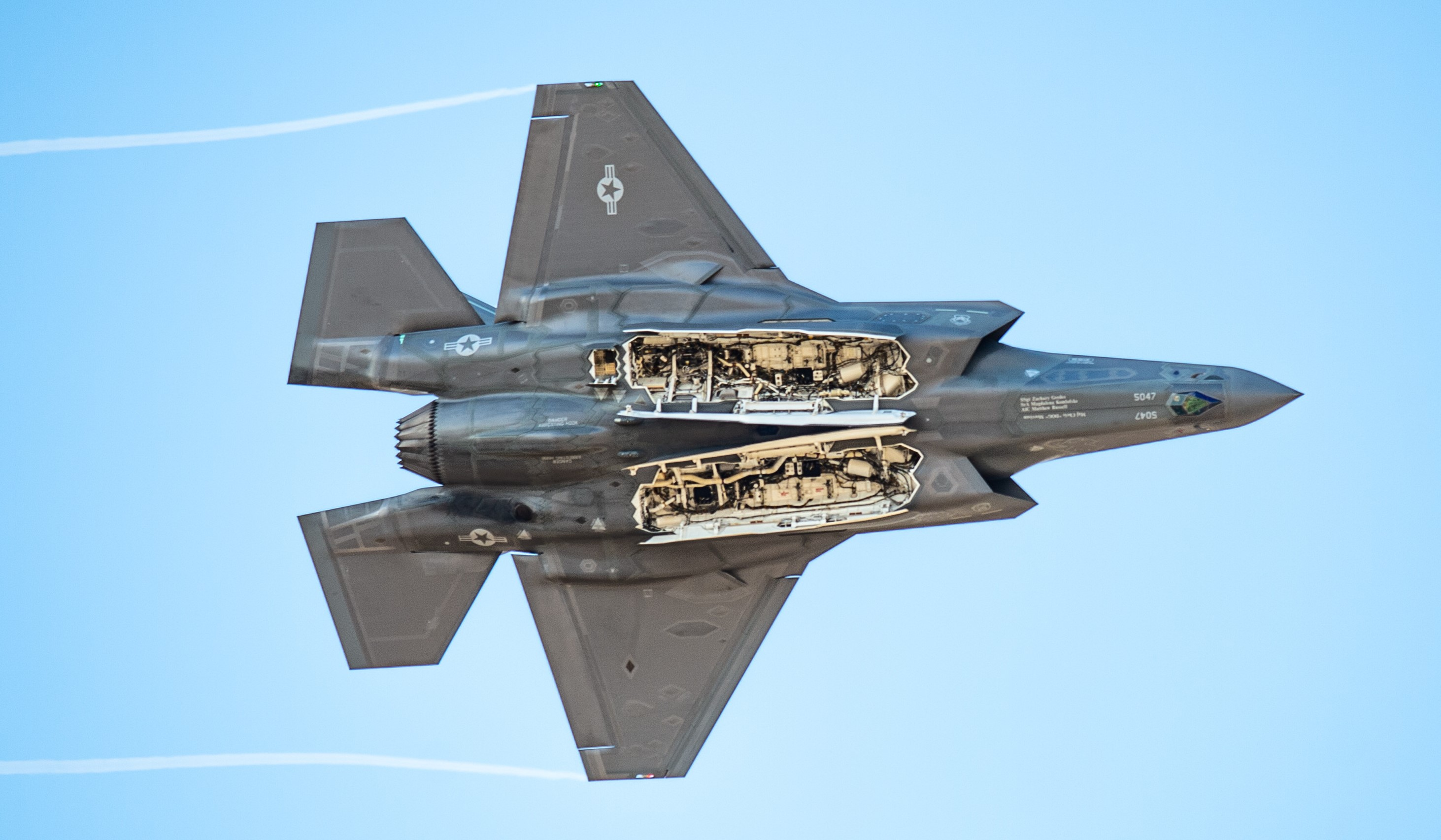
F-35A with all weapon bay doors open

To preserve its stealth shaping, the F-35 has two internal weapons bays, each with two weapons stations. The two outboard weapon stations each can carry ordnance up to 2,500 lb (1,100 kg), or 1,500 lb (680 kg) for the F-35B, while the two inboard stations carry air-to-air missiles. Air-to-surface weapons for the outboard station include the Joint Direct Attack Munition (JDAM), Paveway series of bombs, Joint Standoff Weapon (JSOW), and cluster munitions (Wind Corrected Munitions Dispenser). The station can also carry multiple smaller munitions, such as the GBU-39 Small Diameter Bombs (SDB), GBU-53/B StormBreaker and SPEAR 3; up to four SDBs can be carried per station for the F-35A and F-35C, and three for the F-35B. The F-35A achieved certification to carry the B61 Mod 12 nuclear bomb in October 2023. The inboard station can carry the AIM-120 AMRAAM and eventually the AIM-260 JATM. Two compartments behind the weapons bays contain flares, chaff, and towed decoys.

An F-35A from the 4th Fighter Squadron, 388th Fighter Wing, Hill AFB, Utah, flies a strafing run at the Utah Test & Training Range in August 2018. This was the first operation use of the GAU-22/A of the F-35A aircraft.

The aircraft can use six external weapons stations for missions that do not require stealth; a configuration dubbed "beast mode" by Lockheed Martin. The wingtip pylons each can carry an AIM-9X or AIM-132 ASRAAM and are canted outwards to reduce their radar cross-section. Additionally, each wing has a 5,000 lb (2,300 kg) inboard station and a 2,500 lb (1,100 kg) middle station, or 1,500 lb (680 kg) for F-35B. The external wing stations can carry large air-to-surface weapons that would not fit inside the weapons bays such as the AGM-158 Joint Air to Surface Standoff Missile (JASSM) or AGM-158C LRASM cruise missile. An air-to-air missile load of eight AIM-120s and two AIM-9s is possible using internal and external weapons stations; a configuration of six 2,000 lb (910 kg) bombs, two AIM-120s and two AIM-9s can also be arranged. The F-35 is armed with a GAU-22/A rotary cannon, a lighter four-barrel variant of the 25 mm GAU-12/U Equalizer. On the F-35A, this is mounted internally near the left wing root with 182 rounds carried; the gun is more effective against ground targets than the 20 mm gun carried by other USAF fighters. In 2020, a USAF report noted "unacceptable" accuracy problems with the GAU-22/A on the F-35A. These were due to "misalignments" in the gun's mount, which was also susceptible to cracking. These problems were resolved by 2024. The F-35B and F-35C have no internal gun and instead can use a Terma A/S multi-mission pod (MMP) carrying the GAU-22/A and 220 rounds; the pod is mounted on the centerline of the aircraft and shaped to reduce its radar cross-section. In lieu of the gun, the pod can also be used for different equipment and purposes, such as electronic warfare, aerial reconnaissance, or rear-facing tactical radar. The pod was not susceptible to the accuracy issues that once plagued the gun on the F-35A variant, though it was apparently not problem-free.

Lockheed Martin is developing a weapon rack called Sidekick that would enable the internal outboard station to carry two AIM-120s, thus increasing the internal air-to-air payload to six missiles, currently offered for Block 4. Block 4 will also have a rearranged hydraulic line and bracket to allow the F-35B to carry four SDBs per internal outboard station; integration of the MBDA Meteor is also planned. The USAF and USN are planning to integrate the AGM-88G AARGM-ER internally in the F-35A and F-35C. Norway and Australia are funding an adaptation of the Naval Strike Missile (NSM) for the F-35; designated Joint Strike Missile (JSM), two missiles can be carried internally with an additional four externally. Both hypersonic missiles and directed-energy weapons such as solid-state lasers are currently being considered as future upgrades; in 2024, Lockheed Martin disclosed its proposed Mako hypersonic missile, which can be carried internally in the F-35A and C and externally on the B. (Note: In 2002, solid-state laser weapons were reportedly being developed for the F-35.) Additionally, Lockheed Martin is studying integrating a fiber laser that uses spectral beam combining multiple individual laser modules into a single high-power beam, which can be scaled to various levels.

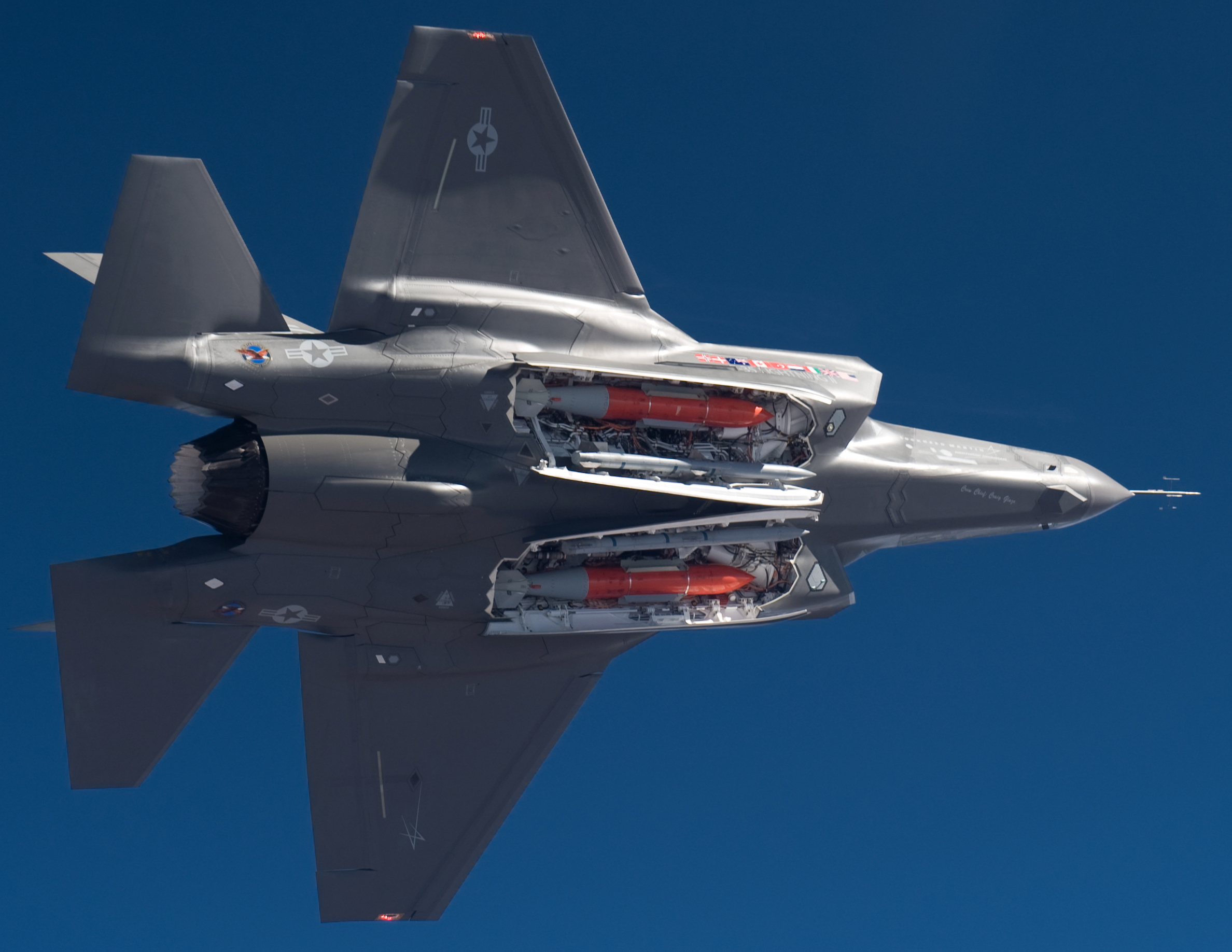
F-35A weapon bays with two GBU-31(V)3 bombs and 2 AIM-120 AMRAAM

The USAF plans for the F-35A to take up the close air support (CAS) mission in contested environments; amid criticism that it is not as well suited as a dedicated attack platform, USAF chief of staff Mark Welsh placed a focus on weapons for CAS sorties, including guided rockets, fragmentation rockets that shatter into individual projectiles before impact, and more compact ammunition for higher capacity gun pods. Fragmentary rocket warheads create greater effects than cannon shells as each rocket creates a "thousand-round burst", delivering more projectiles than a strafing run.

As of 2022, the most common armaments across air forces are the AIM-120 AMRAAM, used by all F-35 operators except the Czech Republic and Finland, and the GBU-31 family of 2,000-pound JDAM bombs, used by all operators except the Czech Republic and the United Kingdom.

=== Engine ===
The aircraft is powered by a single Pratt & Whitney F135 low-bypass augmented turbofan with a rated thrust of 28,000 lbf (125 kN) at military power and 43,000 lbf (191 kN) with afterburner. Derived from the Pratt & Whitney F119 used by the F-22, the F135 has a larger fan and higher bypass ratio to increase subsonic thrust and fuel efficiency, and unlike the F119, is not optimized for supercruise. The engine contributes to the F-35's stealth by having a low-observable augmenter, or afterburner, that incorporates fuel injectors into thick curved vanes; these vanes are covered by ceramic radar-absorbent materials and mask the turbine. The stealthy augmenter had problems with pressure pulsations, or "screech", at low altitude and high speed early in its development. The low-observable axisymmetric nozzle consists of 15 partially overlapping flaps that create a sawtooth pattern at the trailing edge, which reduces radar signature and creates shed vortices that reduce the infrared signature of the exhaust plume. The engine's large size forced the Navy to change its underway replenishment system to bring new engines aboard at sea. The F-35's Integrated Power Package (IPP) performs power and thermal management and integrates environmental control, auxiliary power unit, engine starting, and other functions into a single system.

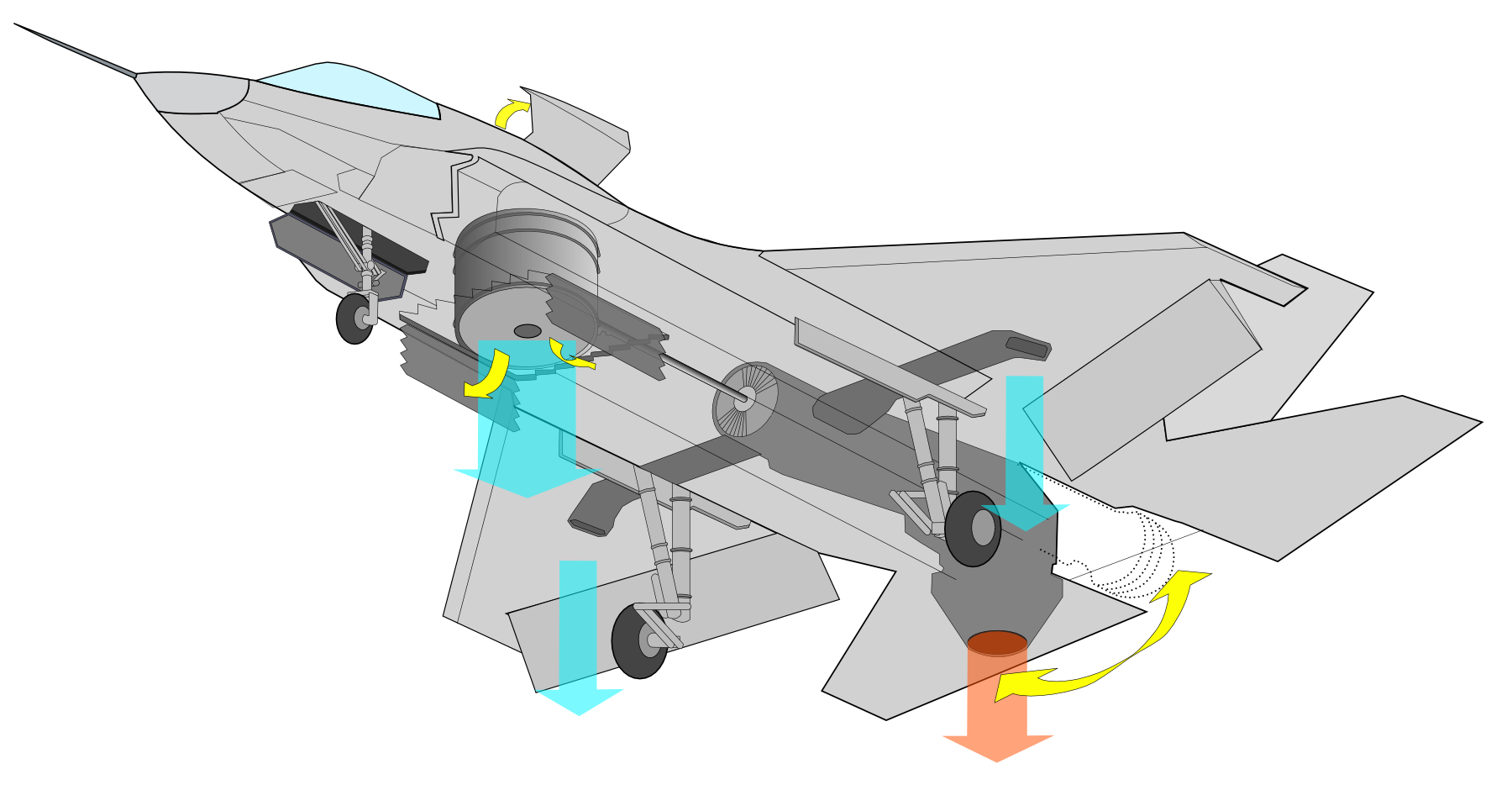
Illustration of the STOVL swivel nozzle, lift fan, and roll-control posts

The F135-PW-600 variant for the F-35B incorporates the Shaft-Driven Lift Fan (SDLF) to allow STOVL operations. Designed by Lockheed Martin and developed by Rolls-Royce, the SDLF, also known as the Rolls-Royce LiftSystem, consists of the lift fan, drive shaft, two roll posts, and a "three-bearing swivel module" (3BSM). The nozzle features three bearings resembling a short cylinder with nonparallel bases. As the toothed edges are rotated by motors, the nozzle swivels from being linear with the engine to being perpendicular. The thrust vectoring 3BSM nozzle allows the main engine exhaust to be deflected downward at the tail of the aircraft and is moved by a "fueldraulic" actuator that uses pressurized fuel as the working fluid. Unlike the Harrier's Pegasus engine that entirely uses direct engine thrust for lift, the F-35B's system augments the swivel nozzle's thrust with the lift fan; the fan is powered by the low-pressure turbine through a drive shaft when engaged with a clutch and placed near the front of the aircraft to provide a torque countering that of the 3BSM nozzle. Roll control during slow flight is achieved by diverting unheated engine bypass air through wing-mounted thrust nozzles called roll posts.

An alternative engine, the General Electric/Allison/Rolls-Royce F136, was being developed in the 1990s and 2000s; originally, F-35 engines from Lot 6 onward were competitively tendered. Using technology from the General Electric YF120, the F136 was claimed to have a greater temperature margin than the F135 due to the higher mass flow design making full use of the inlet. The F136 was canceled in December 2011 due to lack of funding.

The F-35 is expected to receive propulsion upgrades over its lifecycle to adapt to emerging threats and enable additional capabilities. In 2016, the Adaptive Engine Transition Program (AETP) was launched to develop and test adaptive cycle engines, with one major potential application being the re-engining of the F-35; in 2018, both GE and P&W were awarded contracts to develop 45,000 lbf (200 kN) thrust class demonstrators, with the designations XA100 and XA101 respectively. In addition to potential re-engining, P&W is also developing improvements to the baseline F135; the Engine Core Upgrade (ECU) is an update to the power module, originally called Growth Option 1.0 and then Engine Enhancement Package, that improves engine thrust and fuel burn by 5% and bleed air cooling capacity by 50% to support Block 4. The F135 ECU was selected over AETP engines in 2023 to provide additional power and cooling for the F-35. Although GE had expected that the more revolutionary XA100 could enter service with the F-35A and C by 2027 and could be adapted for the F-35B, the increased cost and risk caused the USAF to choose the F135 ECU instead.

=== Maintenance and logistics ===
The F-35 is designed to require less maintenance than earlier stealth aircraft. Some 95% of all field-replaceable parts are "one deep"—that is, nothing else needs to be removed to reach the desired part; for instance, the ejection seat can be replaced without removing the canopy. The F-35 has a fibermat radar-absorbent material (RAM) baked into the skin, which is more durable, easier to work with, and faster to cure than older RAM coatings; similar coatings are being considered for application on older stealth aircraft such as the F-22. Skin corrosion on the F-22 led to the F-35 using a less galvanic corrosion-inducing skin gap filler, fewer gaps in the airframe skin needing filler, and better drainage. The flight control system uses electro-hydrostatic actuators rather than traditional hydraulic systems; these controls can be powered by lithium-ion batteries in an emergency. Commonality between variants led to the USMC's first aircraft maintenance Field Training Detachment, which applied USAF lessons to their F-35 operations.

The F-35 was initially supported by a computerized maintenance management system named Autonomic Logistics Information System (ALIS). In concept, any F-35 can be serviced at any maintenance facility and all parts can be globally tracked and shared as needed. In September 2026, a shipment of F-35 components sent from Australia to the United States for repair was diverted to Hong Kong, prompting investigations by U.S. and Australian authorities amid concerns that the components could potentially expose sensitive F-35 technology. The Pentagon's F-35 Joint Program Office said it was working with U.S. authorities and industry partners to retrieve the components and investigate the incident. Australia said it was assisting the investigation, while its defence minister said the missing components were not believed to be sensitive. Due to numerous problems, such as unreliable diagnoses, excessive connectivity requirements, and security vulnerabilities, ALIS is being replaced by the cloud-based Operational Data Integrated Network (ODIN). From September 2020, ODIN base kits (OBKs) were running ALIS software, as well as ODIN software, first at Marine Corps Air Station (MCAS) Yuma, Arizona, then at Naval Air Station Lemoore, California, in support of Strike Fighter Squadron (VFA) 125 on 16 July 2021, and then Nellis Air Force Base, Nevada, in support of the 422nd Test and Evaluation Squadron (TES) on 6 August 2021. In 2022, over a dozen more OBK sites will replace the ALIS's Standard Operating Unit unclassified (SOU-U) servers. OBK performance is double that of ALIS.

== Operational history ==
=== Testing ===
The first F-35A, AA-1, conducted its engine run in September 2006 and first flew on 15 December 2006. Unlike subsequent aircraft, AA-1 did not have the weight optimization from SWAT, so it mainly tested subsystems common to subsequent aircraft, such as the propulsion, electrical system, and cockpit displays. This aircraft was retired from flight testing in December 2009 and was used for live-fire testing at NAS China Lake.

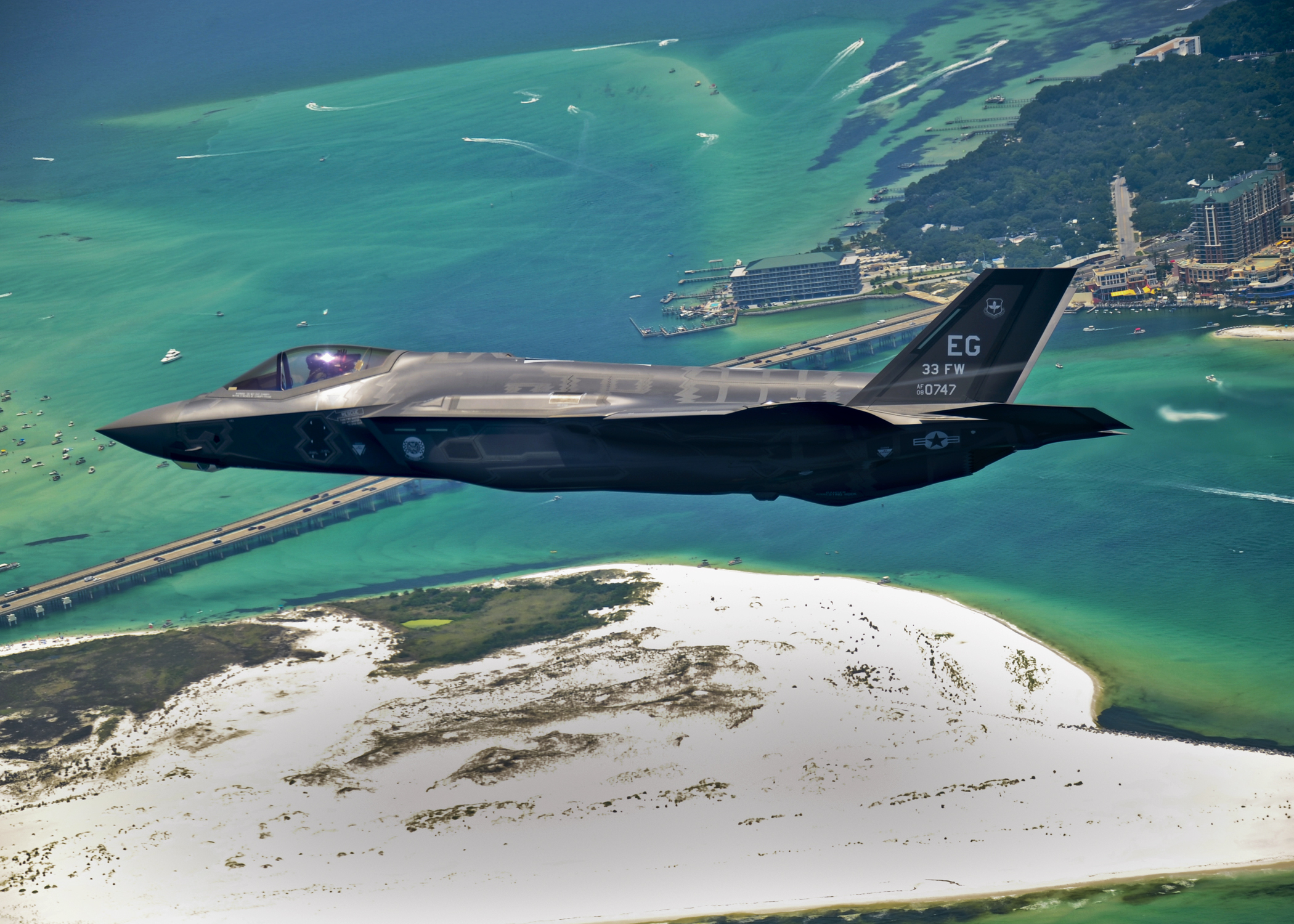
The first delivered USAF F-35A on its delivery flight to Eglin AFB, July 2011

The first F-35B, BF-1, first flew on 11 June 2008, first hovered on 17 March 2010, and first landed vertically the next day. The first weight-optimized F-35A, AF-1, flew on 14 November 2009, and the first such F-35C, CF-1, on 6 June 2010. The F-35 Integrated Test Force (ITF) consisted of 18 aircraft at Edwards Air Force Base and Naval Air Station Patuxent River. At Edwards, five F-35As, three F-35Bs, and one F-35 performed flight sciences testing such as F-35A envelope expansion, flight loads, stores separation, as well as mission systems testing. At Patuxent River, five F-35Bs and four F-35Cs handled their variants' envelope expansion and STOVL and CV suitability testing. Additional carrier suitability testing was conducted at Naval Air Warfare Center Aircraft Division at Lakehurst, New Jersey. Two non-flying aircraft of each variant were used to test static loads and fatigue. The Lockheed Martin CATBird, a modified Boeing 737-300 with a duplication of the cockpit, has been used to test avionics and mission systems. Field testing of the F-35's sensors was conducted during Exercise Northern Edge 2009 and 2011, serving as risk-reduction steps.

Flight tests revealed deficiencies that caused delays, costly redesigns, and several fleet-wide groundings. In 2011, the F-35C failed to catch the arresting wire in all eight landing tests; a redesigned tail hook was delivered two years later. By June 2009, many of the initial flight test targets had been accomplished, but the program was behind schedule. Software and mission systems were among the biggest sources of delays for the program, with sensor fusion proving especially challenging. In fatigue testing, the F-35B suffered several premature cracks, requiring a redesign of the structure. A third non-flying F-35B was planned to test the redesigned structure. Prolonged afterburner use was found to damage the horizontal tails of the F-35B and C. (Note: "Bubbling and blistering" of the horizontal tails and tail booms were observed once during flutter tests of the F-35B and C in late 2011; according to the program office, the problem has only occurred once despite numerous attempts to replicate it, and an improved spray-on coating has been implemented since as a mitigation measure. On 17 December 2019, the Pentagon program office closed the issue with no further actions planned, and instead is imposing a time limit on high-speed flight for the F-35B and C to reduce the risk of damaging the stealth coatings and antennas located on the back of the aircraft.) Early flight control laws had problems with "wing drop" (Note: Wing drop is an uncommanded roll that can occur during high-g transsonic maneuvering.) and also made the airplane sluggish, with high angles-of-attack tests in 2015 against an F-16 showing a lack of energy.

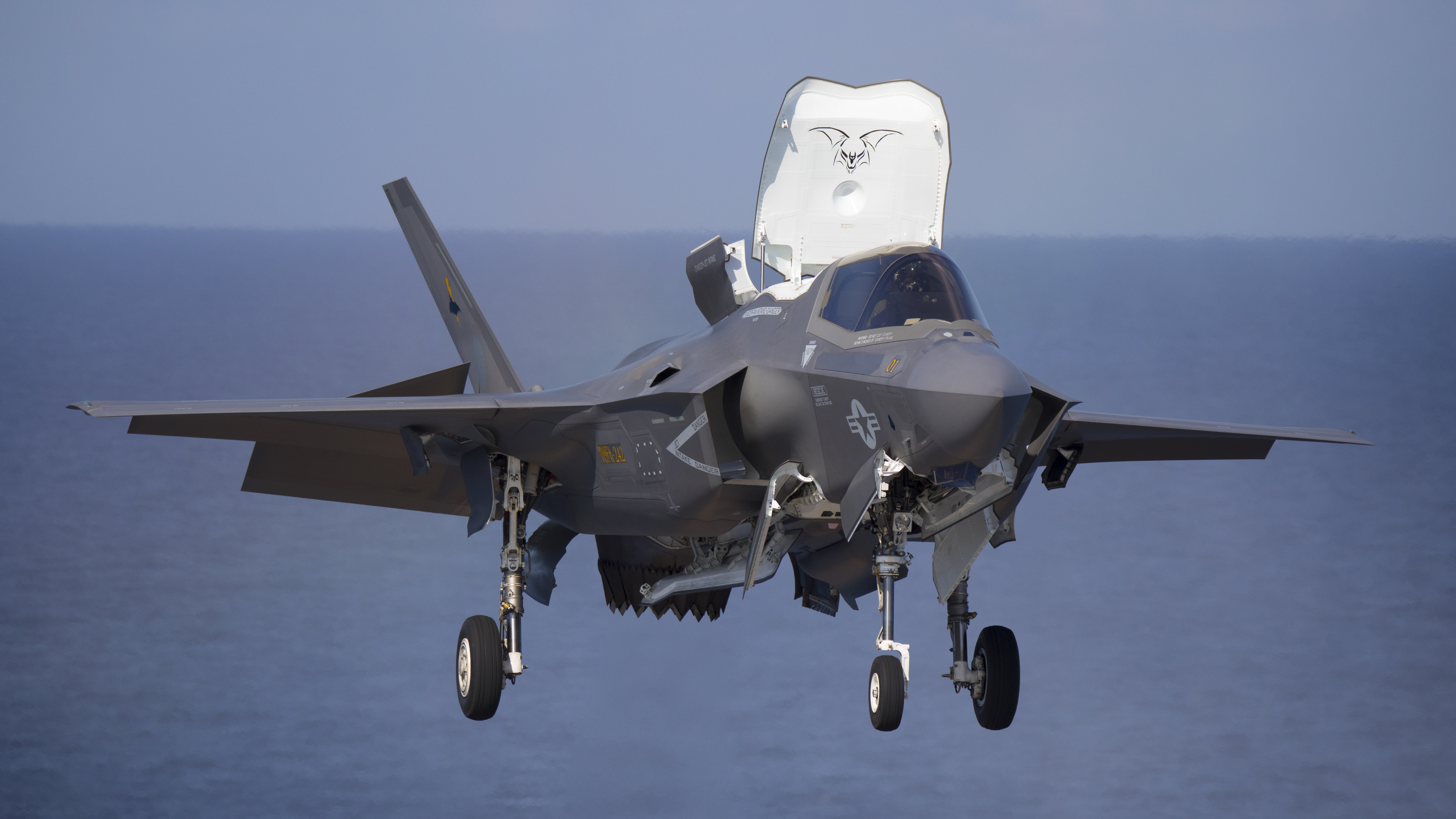
US Marine Corps F-35B lands on JS Izumo

At-sea testing of the F-35B was first conducted aboard USS Wasp. In October 2011, two F-35Bs conducted three weeks of initial sea trials, called Development Test I. The second F-35B sea trials, Development Test II, began in August 2013; two aircraft completed 19 nighttime vertical landings using DAS imagery. The first operational testing involving six F-35Bs was done on the Wasp in May 2015. The final Development Test III on USS America, with operations in high sea states, was completed in late 2016. A Royal Navy F-35 conducted the first "rolling" landing on board HMS Queen Elizabeth in October 2018.

USN F-35C makes the aircraft's first arrested landing aboard the carrier USS Nimitz off the coast of San Diego

After the redesigned tail hook arrived, the F-35C's carrier-based Development Test I began in November 2014 aboard USS Nimitz; it focused on basic day carrier operations and establishing launch and recovery handling procedures. Development Test II, which focused on night operations, weapons loading, and full power launches, took place in October 2015. The final Development Test III was completed in August 2016, and included tests of asymmetric loads and certifying systems for landing qualifications and interoperability. Operational test of the F-35C was conducted in 2018, and the first operational squadron achieved safe-for-flight milestone that December, paving the way for its introduction in 2019.

The F-35's reliability and availability have fallen short of requirements, especially in the early years of testing. The ALIS maintenance and logistics system was plagued by excessive connectivity requirements and faulty diagnoses. In late 2017, the GAO reported the time needed to repair an F-35 part averaged 172 days, which was "twice the program's objective", and that shortage of spare parts was degrading readiness. In 2019, while individual F-35 units have achieved mission-capable rates of over the target of 80% for short periods during deployed operations, fleet-wide rates remained below target. The fleet availability goal of 65% was also not met, although the trend shows improvement. Internal gun accuracy of the F-35A was unacceptable until misalignment issues were addressed by 2024. As of 2020, the number of the program's most serious issues has been decreased by half.

Operational test and evaluation (OT&E) with Block 3F, the final configuration for SDD, began in December 2018, but its completion was delayed particularly by technical problems in integration with the DoD's Joint Simulation Environment (JSE); the F-35 finally completed all JSE trials in September 2023.

=== United States ===
==== Training ====
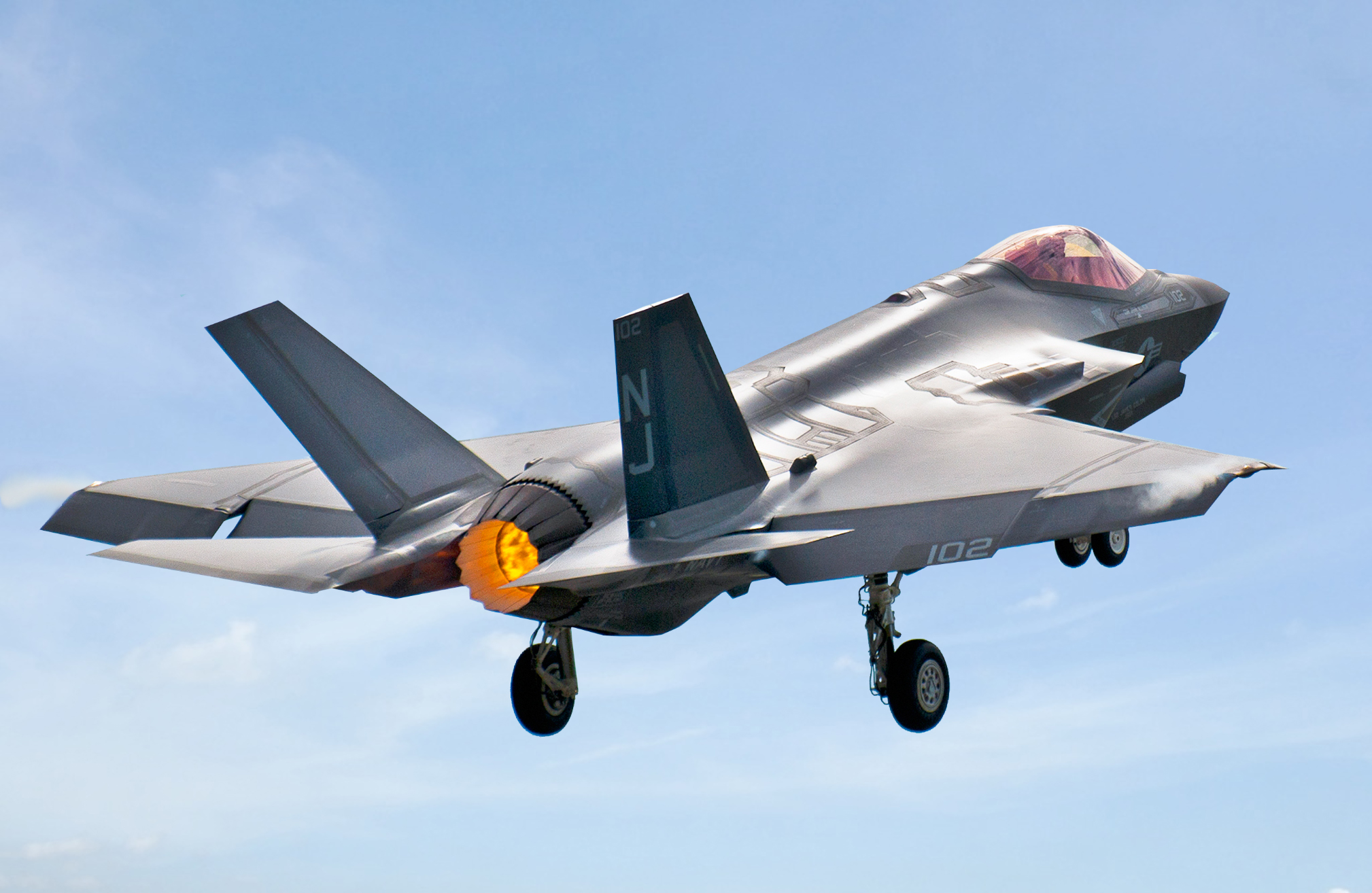
The first F-35C Lightning II sortie takes off from VFA-101 at Eglin Air Force Base

The F-35A and F-35B were cleared for basic flight training in early 2012, despite concerns that the system's immaturity could reduce safety and performance. During the Low Rate Initial Production (LRIP) phase, the three US military services jointly developed tactics and procedures using flight simulators, testing effectiveness, discovering problems, and refining design. On 10 September 2012, the USAF began an operational utility evaluation (OUE) of the F-35A, including logistical support, maintenance, personnel training, and pilot execution.

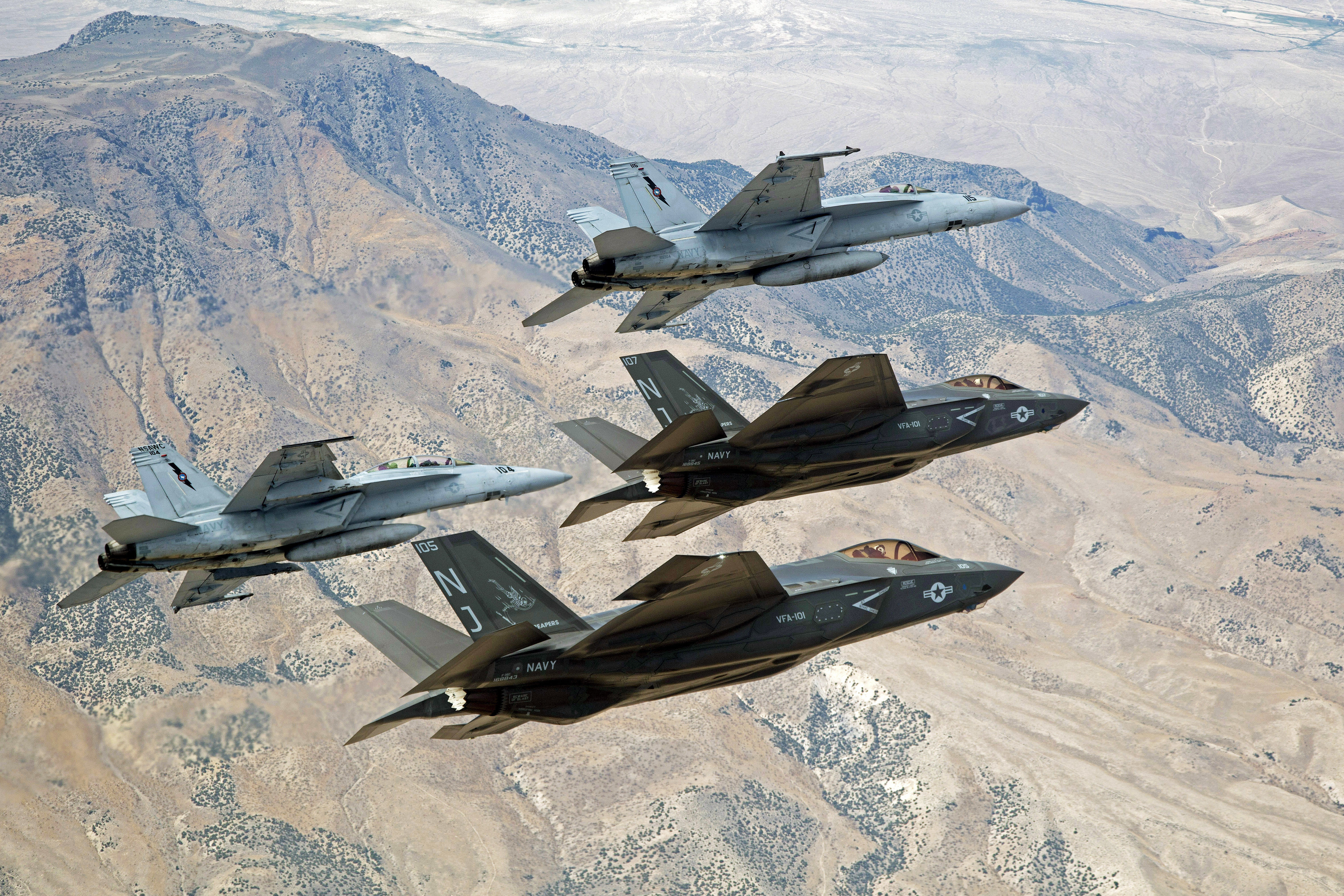
A pair of F-35Cs and F/A-18E/Fs fly over NAS Fallon, home of TOPGUN, in September 2015.

The USMC F-35B Fleet Replacement Squadron (FRS) was initially based at Eglin AFB in 2012 alongside USAF F-35A training units, before moving to MCAS Beaufort in 2014; another FRS was stood up at MCAS Miramar in 2020. The USAF holds its basic F-35A course at Eglin AFB and Luke AFB; in January 2013, training began at Eglin with capacity for 100 pilots and 2,100 maintainers at once. The 6th Weapons Squadron of the USAF Weapons School was activated at Nellis AFB in June 2017 for F-35A weapons instructor curriculum; the 65th Aggressor Squadron was reactivated with the F-35A in June 2022 to expand training against adversary stealth aircraft tactics. The USN stood up its F-35C FRS in 2012—VFA-101 at Eglin AFB—then in 2019 consolidated operations under VFA-125 at NAS Lemoore in 2019. The F-35C was introduced to the Strike Fighter Tactics Instructor course, or TOPGUN, in 2020, with the course syllabus revamped to accommodate the aircraft's additional capabilities.

==== US Marine Corps ====
On 16 November 2012, the USMC received the first F-35B of VMFA-121 at MCAS Yuma. The USMC declared Initial Operational Capability (IOC) for the F-35B in the Block 2B configuration on 31 July 2015 after operational trials, with some limitations in night operations, mission systems, and weapons carriage. USMC F-35Bs participated in their first Red Flag exercise in July 2016 with 67 sorties conducted. The first F-35B deployment occurred in 2017 at MCAS Iwakuni, Japan; combat employment began in July 2018 from the amphibious assault ship USS Essex, with the first combat strike on 27 September 2018 against a Taliban target in Afghanistan.

During a conflict, the USMC plans to disperse the aircraft among austere forward-deployed bases with shelter and concealment to improve survivability while remaining close to a battlespace. Known as distributed STOVL operations (DSO), F-35Bs would operate from temporary bases in allied territory within hostile missile engagement zones and displace inside the enemy's 24- to 48-hour targeting cycle; this strategy allows F-35Bs to rapidly respond to operational needs, with mobile forward arming and refueling points (M-FARPs) accommodating KC-130 and MV-22 Osprey aircraft to rearm and refuel the jets, as well as littoral areas for sea links of mobile distribution sites. For higher echelons of maintenance, F-35Bs would return from M-FARPs to rear-area friendly bases or ships. Helicopter-portable metal planking is needed to protect unprepared roads from the F-35B's exhaust; the USMC is studying lighter heat-resistant options. These operations have become part of the larger USMC Expeditionary Advanced Base Operations (EABO) concept.

The first USMC F-35C squadron, VMFA-314, achieved full operational capability in July 2021 and was first deployed on board USS Abraham Lincoln as a part of Carrier Air Wing 9 in January 2022.

In 2024, Lt. Gen. Sami Sadat of Afghanistan described an operation in which F-35Bs from USS Essex bombed a Taliban position through cloud cover. "The impact [the F-35] left on my soldiers was amazing. Like, whoa, you know, we have this technology", Sadat said. "But also the impact on the Taliban was quite crippling, because they have never seen Afghan forces move in the winter, and they have never seen planes that could bomb through the clouds."

On 9 November 2024, Marine F-35Cs struck targets associated with the Houthi movement in Yemen during the Red Sea crisis—possibly the first time the F-35C was used in combat.

==== US Air Force ====
USAF F-35As first achieved IOC in 2016: aircraft in the Block 3i configuration with the 34th Fighter Squadron at Hill Air Force Base, Utah, on 2 August. F-35As conducted their first Red Flag exercise the following year; system maturity had improved and the aircraft scored a kill ratio of 15:1 against an F-16 aggressor squadron in a high-threat environment. F-35As were first deployed on 15 April 2019 to Al Dhafra Air Base, UAE; 12 days later, they were first used in combat—in an airstrike on an Islamic State tunnel network in northern Iraq.

F-35As were first stationed in Europe in 2021, when two squadrons totaling 48 aircraft were added to the 48th Fighter Wing's F-15C and F-15E squadrons at RAF Lakenheath in the UK. The first aircraft of the 495th Fighter Squadron arrived on 15 December 2021.

The F-35's operating cost is higher than some older USAF tactical aircraft. In 2015, the cost per flight hour (CPFH) of the A-10 was $17,716; the F-15C, $41,921; and the F-16C, $22,514. In fiscal year 2018, the F-35A's CPFH was $44,000; this shrank to $35,000 in 2019, and Lockheed Martin said it hoped to reduce it to $25,000 by 2025 through performance-based logistics and other measures.

In 2025, US officials said F-35As and F-22s launched from land bases in the Persian Gulf region were used to attempt to draw surface-to-air missile fire ahead of B-2 bombing runs during the United States strikes on Iranian nuclear sites.

In January 2026, F-35s participated in the United States strikes in Venezuela, along with F-22s, B-1s, F/A-18s, EA-18s, and various intelligence, surveillance, and reconnaissance aircraft and drones. General Dan Caine claimed the aircraft were used to disable Venezuelan air defense systems to ensure the safe passage of the helicopters into the target area. The operation resulted in the capture of Venezuelan President Nicolás Maduro.

==== US Navy ====
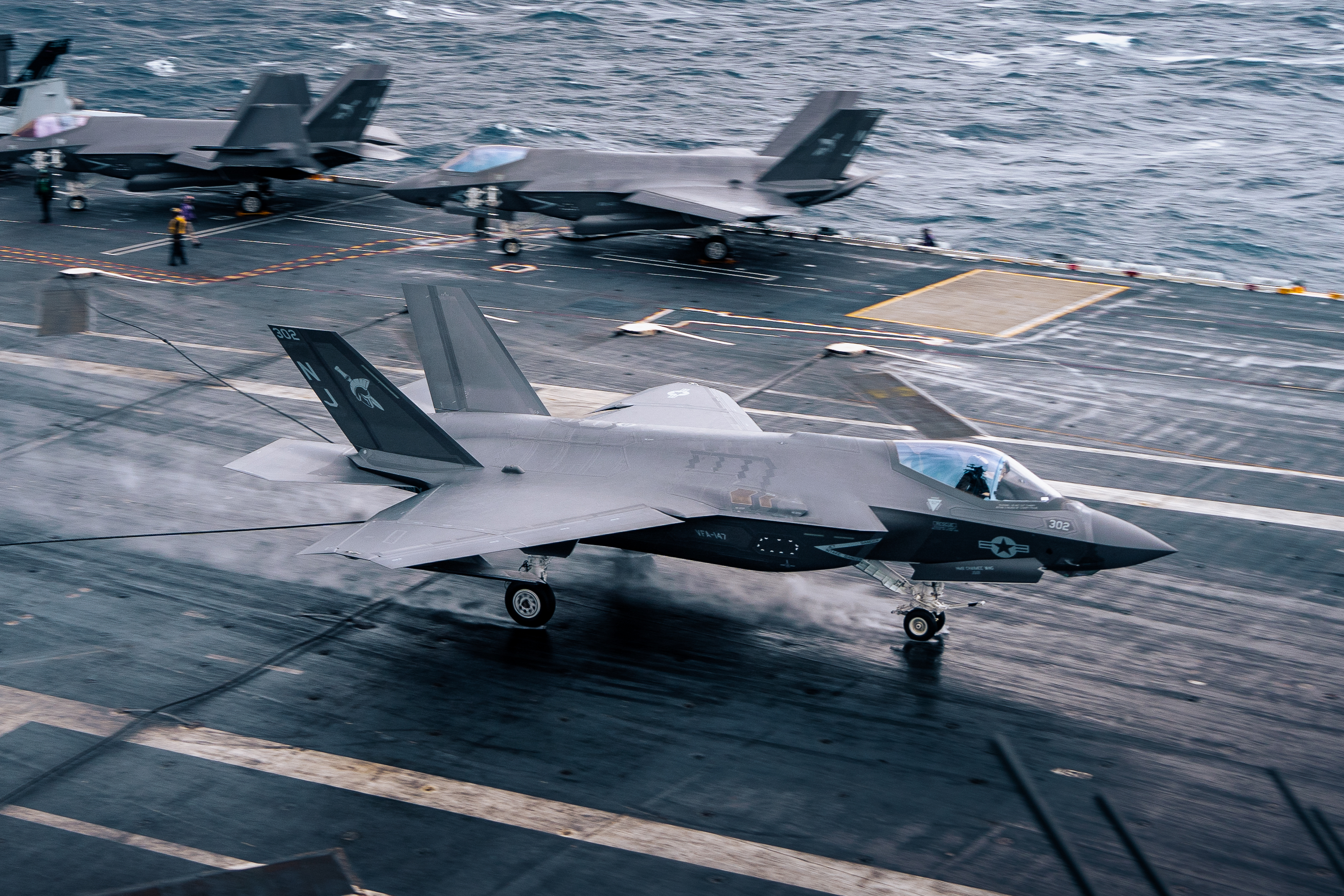
VFA-147 F-35C catches the wire on USS George Washington

The USN achieved operational status with the F-35C in Block 3F on 28 February 2019. On 2 August 2021, the F-35C of VFA-147, as well as the CMV-22 Osprey, embarked on their maiden deployments as part of Carrier Air Wing 2 on board USS Carl Vinson.

USN F-35Cs operating from the USS Carl Vinson took part in the training exercise Pacific Stellar 2025 in February, along with the French and Japanese navies.

In April 2025, F-35Cs from VFA-97 shot down multiple Houthi drones over the Red Sea, making it the first time the Navy has used the variant in combat.

=== United Kingdom ===
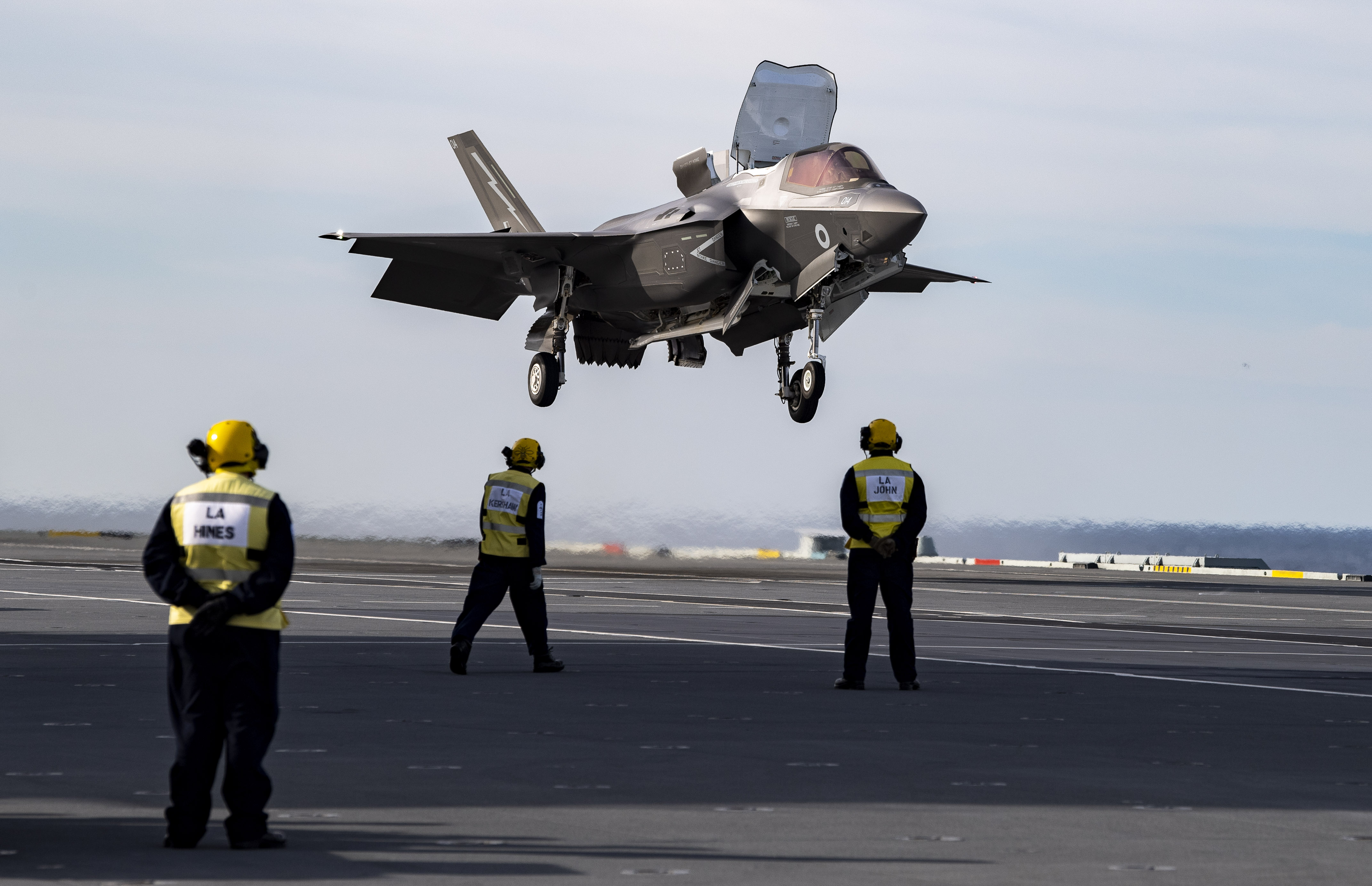
F-35B ZM148 of No. 617 Squadron landing on HMS Queen Elizabeth, 2019

The United Kingdom's Royal Air Force and Royal Navy operate the F-35B. Called Lightning in British service, it has replaced the Harrier GR9, retired in 2010, and Tornado GR4, retired in 2019. The F-35 is to be Britain's primary strike aircraft for the next three decades. One of the Royal Navy's requirements was a Shipborne Rolling and Vertical Landing (SRVL) mode to increase maximum landing weight by using wing lift during landing. Like the Italian Navy, British F-35Bs use ski-jumps to fly from their aircraft carriers, HMS Queen Elizabeth and HMS Prince of Wales. British F-35Bs are not intended to use the Brimstone 2 missile. In July 2013, Chief of the Air Staff Air Chief Marshal Sir Stephen Dalton announced that No. 617 Squadron would be the RAF's first operational F-35 squadron.

The first British F-35 squadron was No. 17 (Reserve) Test and Evaluation Squadron (TES), which stood up on 12 April 2013 as the aircraft's Operational Evaluation Unit. By June 2013, the RAF had received three F-35s of the 48 on order, initially based at Eglin Air Force Base. In June 2015, the F-35B undertook its first launch from a ski-jump at NAS Patuxent River. On 5 July 2017, it was announced that the second UK-based RAF squadron would be No. 207 Squadron, which reformed on 1 August 2019 as the Lightning Operational Conversion Unit (OCU). No. 617 Squadron reformed on 18 April 2018 during a ceremony in Washington, D.C., becoming the first RAF front-line squadron to operate the type; receiving its first four F-35Bs on 6 June, flying from MCAS Beaufort to RAF Marham. On 10 January 2019, No. 617 Squadron and its F-35s were declared combat-ready.

April 2019 saw the first overseas deployment of a UK F-35 squadron when No. 617 Squadron went to RAF Akrotiri, Cyprus. This reportedly led on 25 June 2019 to the first combat use of an RAF F-35B: an armed reconnaissance flight searching for Islamic State targets in Iraq and Syria. In October 2019, F-35s of 617 Squadron and No. 17 TES were embarked on HMS Queen Elizabeth for the first time. No. 617 Squadron departed RAF Marham on 22 January 2020 for their first Exercise Red Flag with the Lightning. As of November 2022, 26 F-35Bs were based in the United Kingdom (with 617 and 207 Squadrons) and a further three were permanently based in the United States (with 17 Squadron) for testing and evaluation purposes.

The UK's second operational squadron is the Fleet Air Arm's 809 Naval Air Squadron, which stood up in December 2023.

In June 2025, as part of its second phase of procurement, the UK announced plans to procure 12 F-35As, capable of delivering both conventional and nuclear weapons, including the B61-12 thermonuclear gravity bomb. The aircraft will form part of NATO's dual-capable aircraft program. The F-35As will be based in RAF Marham to be used in a training role on routine operations as part of the OCU. 15 F-35Bs are also planned in this phase.

In July 2025, United States B61 nuclear weapons were redeployed to the US-operated RAF Lakenheath for the first time since 2008. The base operates F-35As and F-15Es, both capable of delivering the B61.

On March 3, 2026, the Ministry of Defence confirmed that a British F-35B shot down a hostile drone over Jordan, marking the first time a British F-35 has destroyed a target in operations.

=== Australia ===
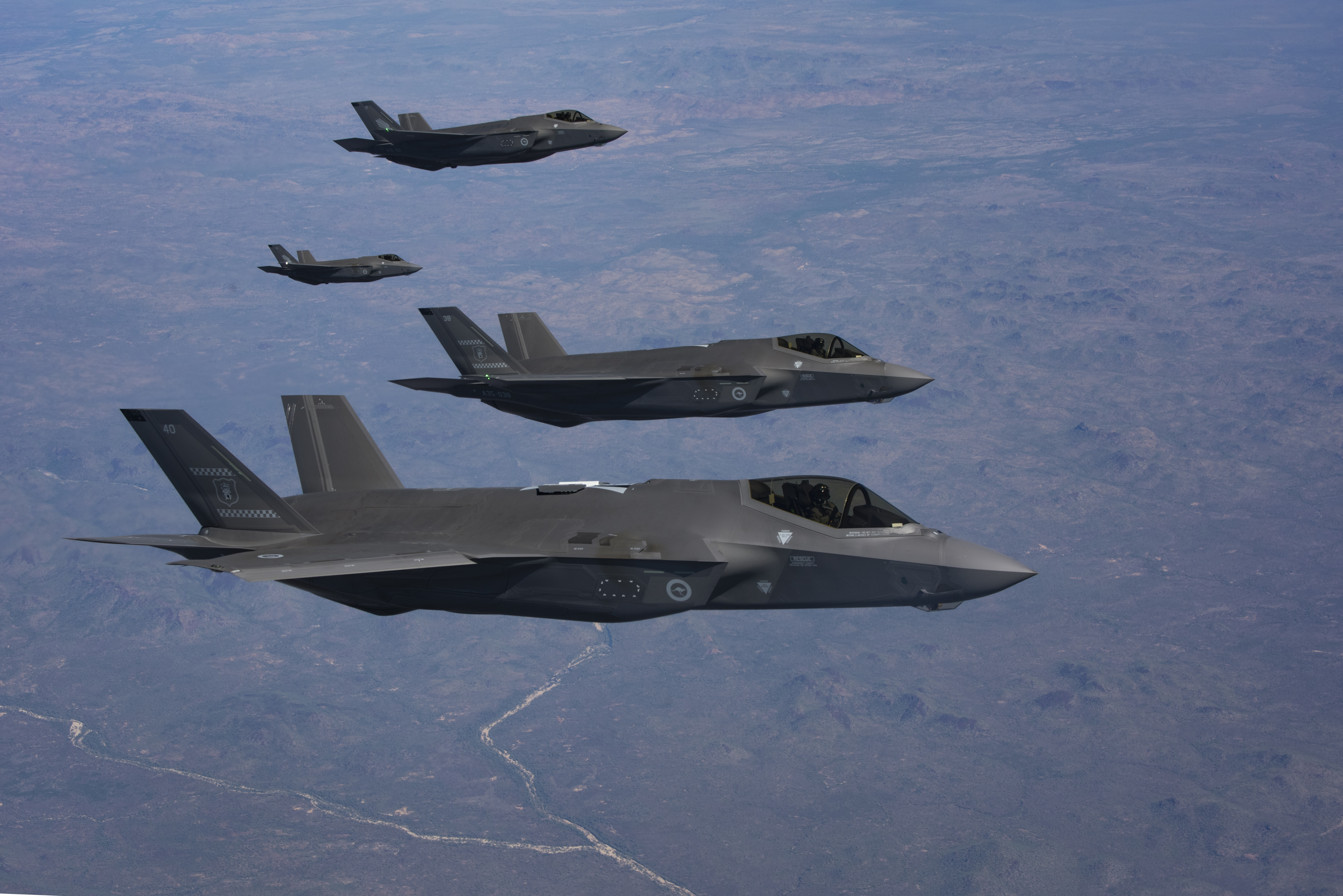
Four F-35As assigned to No. 3 Squadron RAAF in 2023

Australia's first F-35, designated A35-001, was manufactured in 2014, with flight training provided through the international Pilot Training Center (PTC) at Luke Air Force Base in Arizona. The first two F-35s were unveiled to the Australian public on 3 March 2017 at the Avalon Airshow. By 2021, the Royal Australian Air Force had accepted 26 F-35As, with nine in the US and 17 operating at No 3 Squadron and No 2 Operational Conversion Unit at RAAF Base Williamtown. With 41 trained RAAF pilots and 225 trained technicians for maintenance, the fleet was declared ready to deploy on operations. It was originally expected that Australia would receive all 72 F-35s by 2023. Its final nine aircraft, which were the TR-3 version, arrived in Australia in December 2024.

=== Israel ===
The Israeli Air Force (IAF) declared the F-35 operationally capable on 6 December 2017. According to Kuwaiti newspaper Al Jarida, in July 2018, a test mission of at least three IAF F-35s flew to Iran's capital Tehran and back to Tel Aviv. While publicly unconfirmed, regional leaders acted on the report; Iran's supreme leader Ali Khamenei reportedly fired the air force chief and commander of Iran's Revolutionary Guard Corps over the mission.

On 22 May 2018, IAF chief Amikam Norkin said that the service had employed its F-35Is in two attacks on two battle fronts. This was part of the May 2018 Israel-Iran clashes, where airstrikes were claimed to target Iranian positions surrounding Syria's capital of Damascus and the buffer UNDOF Zone of the occupied Golan Heights. This marks the first combat operation of an F-35 by any country. Norkin said it had been flown "all over the Middle East", and showed photos of an F-35I flying over Beirut in daylight. In July 2019, Israel expanded its strikes against Iranian missile shipments; IAF F-35Is allegedly struck Iranian targets in Iraq twice.

In November 2020, the IAF announced that a recent four-plane delivery included a unique F-35I testbed aircraft to be used to test and integrate Israeli-produced weapons and electronic systems on later F-35s. It is the only testbed F-35 delivered to a non-US customer.

On 11 May 2021, eight IAF F-35Is took part in an attack on 150 targets in Hamas' rocket array, including 50 to 70 launch pits in the northern Gaza Strip, as part of Operation Guardian of the Walls. On 6 March 2022, the IDF stated that on 15 March 2021, F-35Is shot down two Iranian drones carrying weapons to the Gaza Strip. This was the first operational interception and downing carried out by the F-35. They were also used in the Gaza war. On 2 November 2023, the IDF posted on social media that they used an F-35I to shoot down a Houthi cruise missile over the Red Sea that was fired from Yemen during the Gaza war.

F-35Is were used in airstrikes against Lebanon, including aerial refueling in the country's airspace, in August and September 2024, as part of the Israel–Hezbollah conflict (2023–present). F-35Is were used in the 29 September 2024 Israeli attacks on Yemen. F-35Is were also reportedly involved in the October 2024 Israeli strikes on Iran. The F-35 was also used during the Twelve-Day War, equipped with low-observable conformal fuel tanks to extend their range and allow operations over Iranian soil without mid-air refueling. Iranian state-run media claimed that Iran shot down several Israeli F-35 jets, though the IDF denied the claims.

From 28 February 2026, Israeli F-35s participated in US-Israeli strikes on Iran, beginning the 2026 Iran war. About 200 IAF jets, including F-35Is and F-15s, struck about 500 targets. The US had also sent more F-35s to the region during the prewar buildup. On 4 March, the IDF announced its F-35I shot down an Islamic Republic of Iran Air Force Yakovlev Yak-130 combat trainer over Tehran; the first claimed air-to-air kill of a crewed aircraft by any F-35, and the first IAF air-to-air kill of a crewed aircraft since November 1985, when an F-15 downed a pair of Syrian MiG-23s over Lebanon. According to the IAF, the engagement was conducted at beyond visual range using long-range missiles, and was described as a "rapid response" rather than a close-range dogfight. The Yak-130 was reportedly flying a counter-drone mission over the Iranian capital at the time. Unverified footage appeared to show the Yak-130 going down in a mountainous area north of Tehran, with two ejections visible.

The Israeli Air Force claimed F-35I wartime combat readiness rates of 90%, while a study by the United States Government Accountability Office showed a decline in combat readiness of American F-35s, dropping from 67% in 2021 to 44% in 2025. The IAF has used the F-35 frequently during recent conflicts, including the 2026 Iran war, and it has used multiple tiers of IAF staff who maintain the aircraft.

=== Italy ===
Italy's F-35As were declared to have reached initial operational capability (IOC) on 30 November 2018. At the time, Italy had taken delivery of 10 F-35As and one F-35B, with 2 F-35As and the one F-35B being stationed in the US for training; the remaining 8 F-35As were stationed in Amendola. Italian Navy F-35Bs have been operating from the Italian aircraft carrier ITS Cavour, where they have also conducted drills in the Philippine Sea with the US in 2024. Construction in 2023 showed that Ghedi Air Base is planning to host F-35As for Italian delivery of US B61 nuclear weapons under NATO nuclear sharing.

=== Japan ===
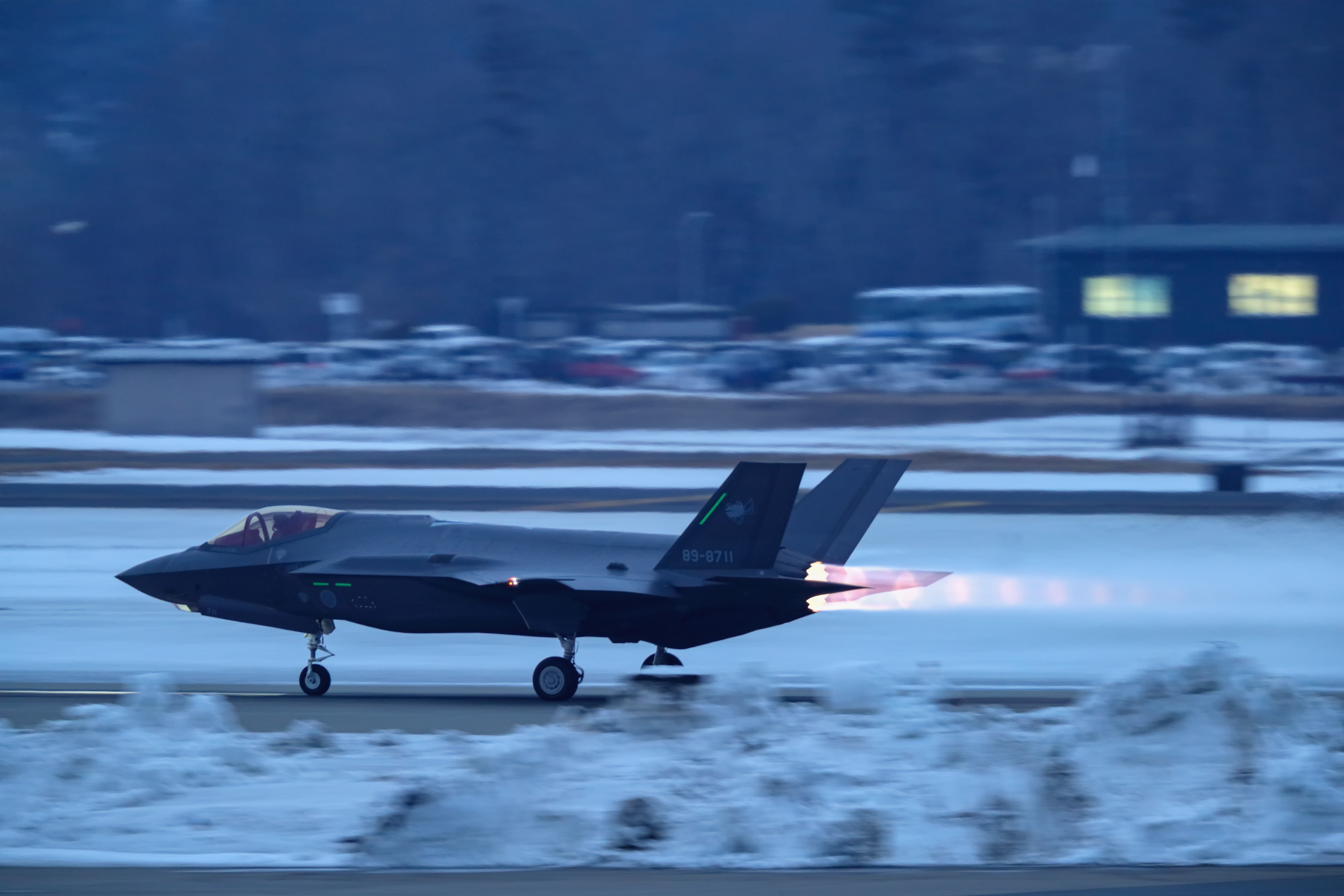
F-35A in afterburner at JASDF Misawa Air Base

Japan's F-35As were declared to have reached initial operational capability (IOC) on 29 March 2019. At the time Japan had taken delivery of 10 F-35As stationed in Misawa Air Base. Japan plans to eventually acquire a total of 147 F-35s, which will include 42 F-35Bs. It plans to use the latter variant to equip Japan's Izumo-class multi-purpose destroyers. On August 7, 2025, the first three Japanese F-35B's landed at Nyutabaru Air Base. Four more are to arrive by March 2026.

On 9 April 2019, a JASDF F-35A (tail number 79-8705) attached to Misawa Air Base crashed east of the Aomori Prefecture during a training mission over the Pacific Ocean at an estimated speed of Mach 0.9. Japan grounded its 12 F-35As during the investigation. The US Navy and Japan Maritime Self-Defense Force searched for the missing aircraft and pilot, finding debris soon afterward and recovered the pilot's remains in June. The aircraft flight recorder was too damaged for any data to be retrieved. Despite speculation that China or Russia might attempt to salvage the aircraft, the Japanese Defense Ministry reported no "reported activities" from either country. The pilot had radioed his intention to abort the drill and was apparently conscious and responsive until 15 seconds before crashing, but he sent no distress signal nor attempted any recovery maneuvers as he descended at a rapid rate. The accident report attributed the cause to the pilot's spatial disorientation. As of 2025, this is the only known fatal crash of any F-35 variant.

=== Norway ===
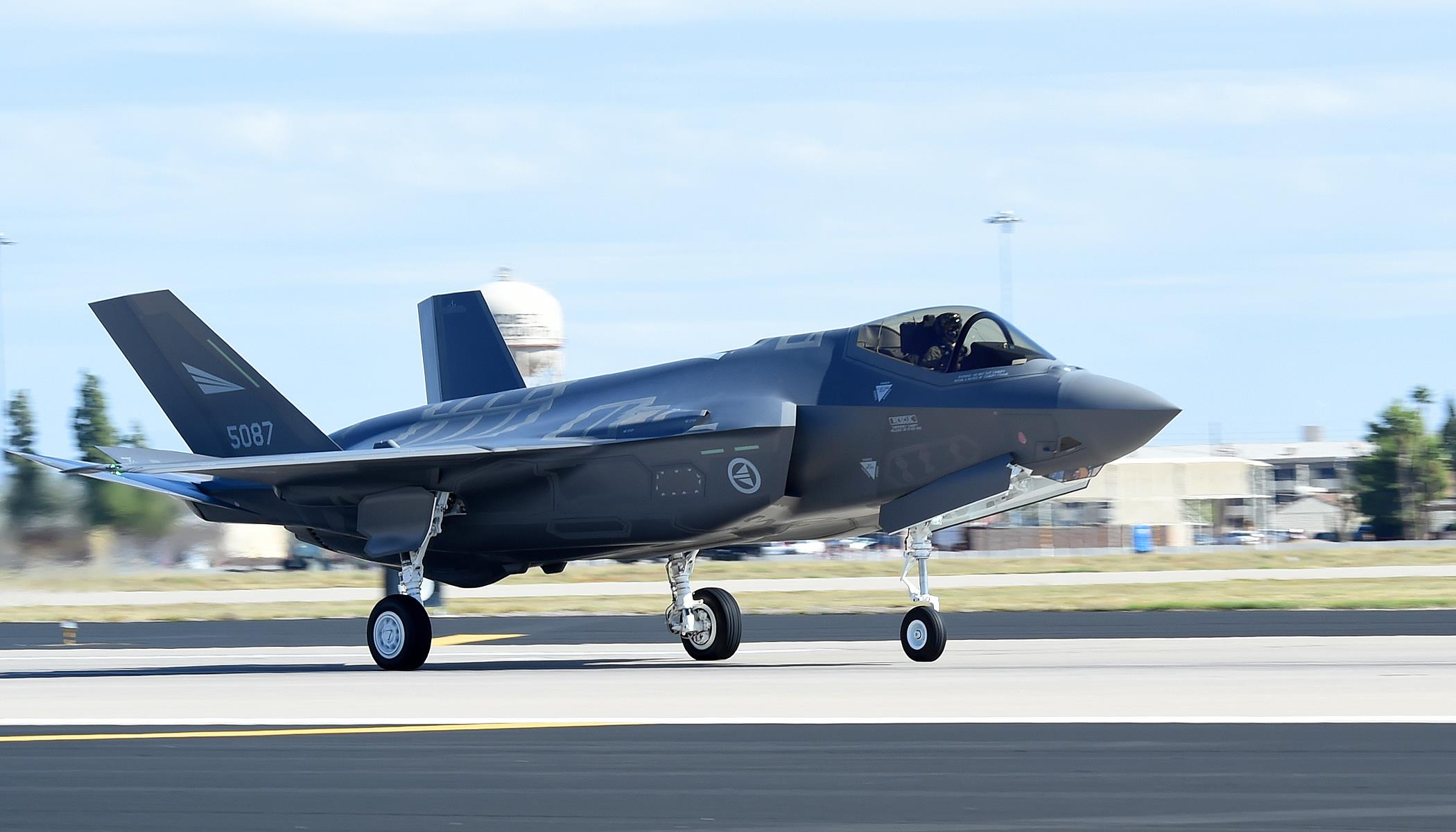
First Norwegian F-35A Lightning II at Luke Air Force Base, Arizona

On 6 November 2019, Norway declared initial operational capability (IOC) for its fleet of 15 F-35As out of a planned 52 F-35As. On 6 January 2022, Norway's F-35As replaced its older F-16A and B models for the NATO quick reaction alert mission in the high north. In April 2025, the total number of F-35s delivered totaled 49 out of 52.

On 22 September 2023, two F-35As from the Royal Norwegian Air Force landed on a motorway near Tervo, Finland, showing, for the first time, that F-35As can operate from paved roads. Unlike the F-35B, they cannot land vertically. The fighters were also refueled with their engines running. Major General Rolf Folland, Commander of the RNAF, said: "Fighter jets are vulnerable on the ground, so by being able to use small airfields – and now motorways – (this) increases our survivability in war".

=== Netherlands ===
On 27 December 2021, the Netherlands declared initial operational capability (IOC) for its fleet of 24 F-35As it has received to date from its order for 46 F-35As. In 2022, the Netherlands announced it will order an additional six F-35s, totaling 52 aircraft ordered. As of September 2024, 40 out of the 52 ordered have been delivered, and the Netherlands seeks to order another six jets to help completely phase out their F-16 fleet. As of 2026, under Dutch participation in NATO nuclear sharing, the F-35As at Volkel Air Base are assigned a nuclear mission, with US B61 Mod 12 nuclear bombs available to them, numbering 10 to 15 as of 2023.

== Variants ==
The F-35 was designed with three initial variants – the F-35A, a CTOL land-based version; the F-35B, a STOVL version capable of use either on land or on aircraft carriers; and the F-35C, a CATOBAR carrier-based version. Since then, there has been work on the design of nationally specific versions for Israel and Canada.

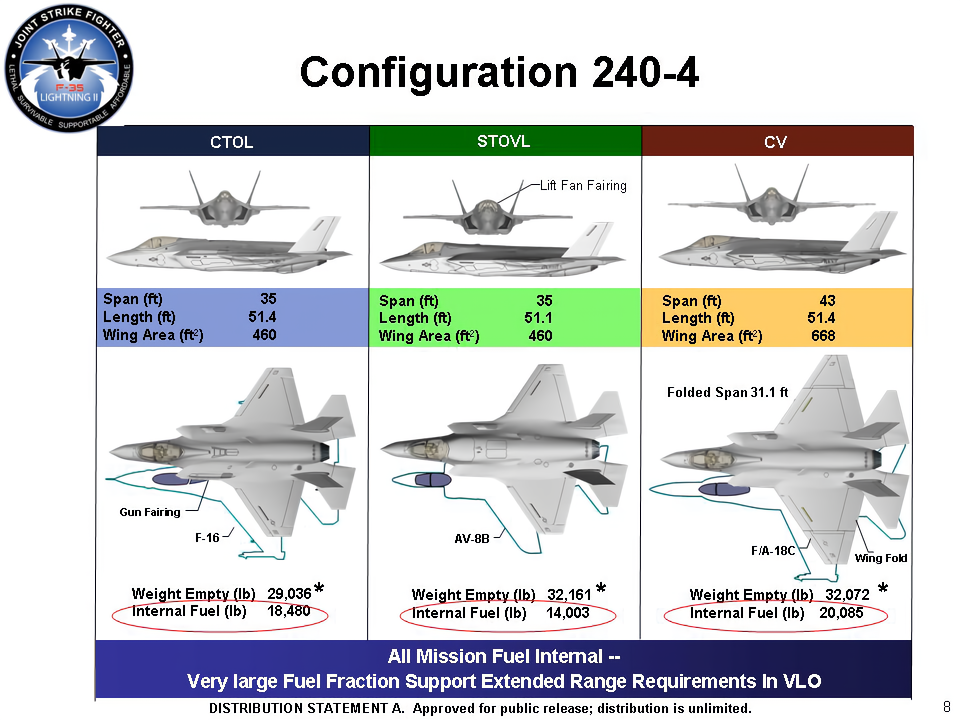
The three main variants: CTOL for conventional take-off and landing, STOVL for short take-off and vertical-landing, and CV for carrier variant

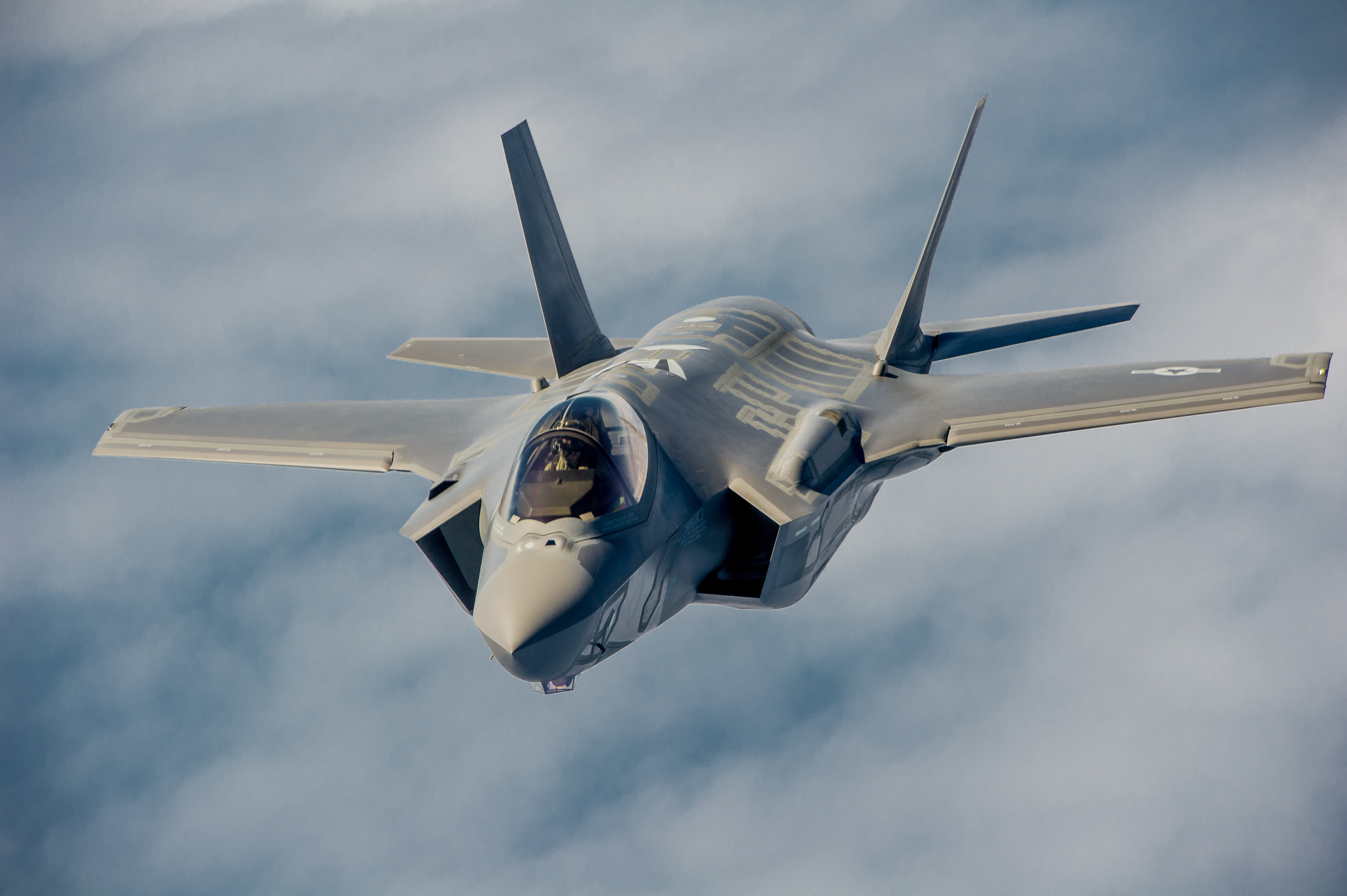
USAF F-35A in flight, 2013

Video of a USMC F-35B conducting the first vertical landing aboard USS Wasp on 3 October 2011

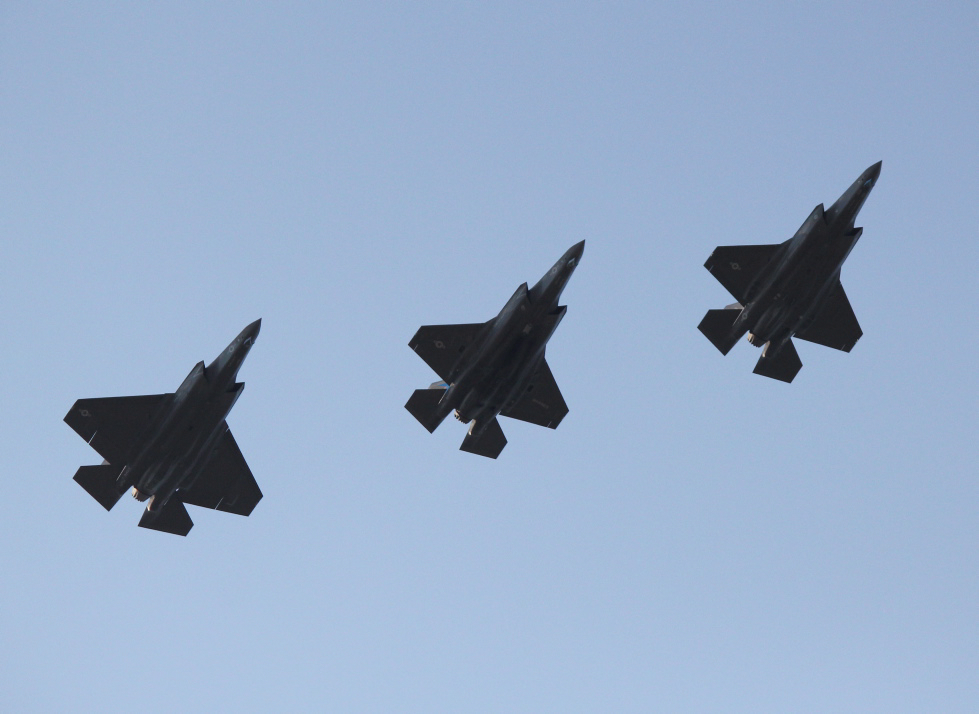
F-35 variants flying in formation. The F-35C (left) has a larger wing than other variants, while the F-35B (center) has a shorter nozzle and no tailhook.

=== F-35A ===
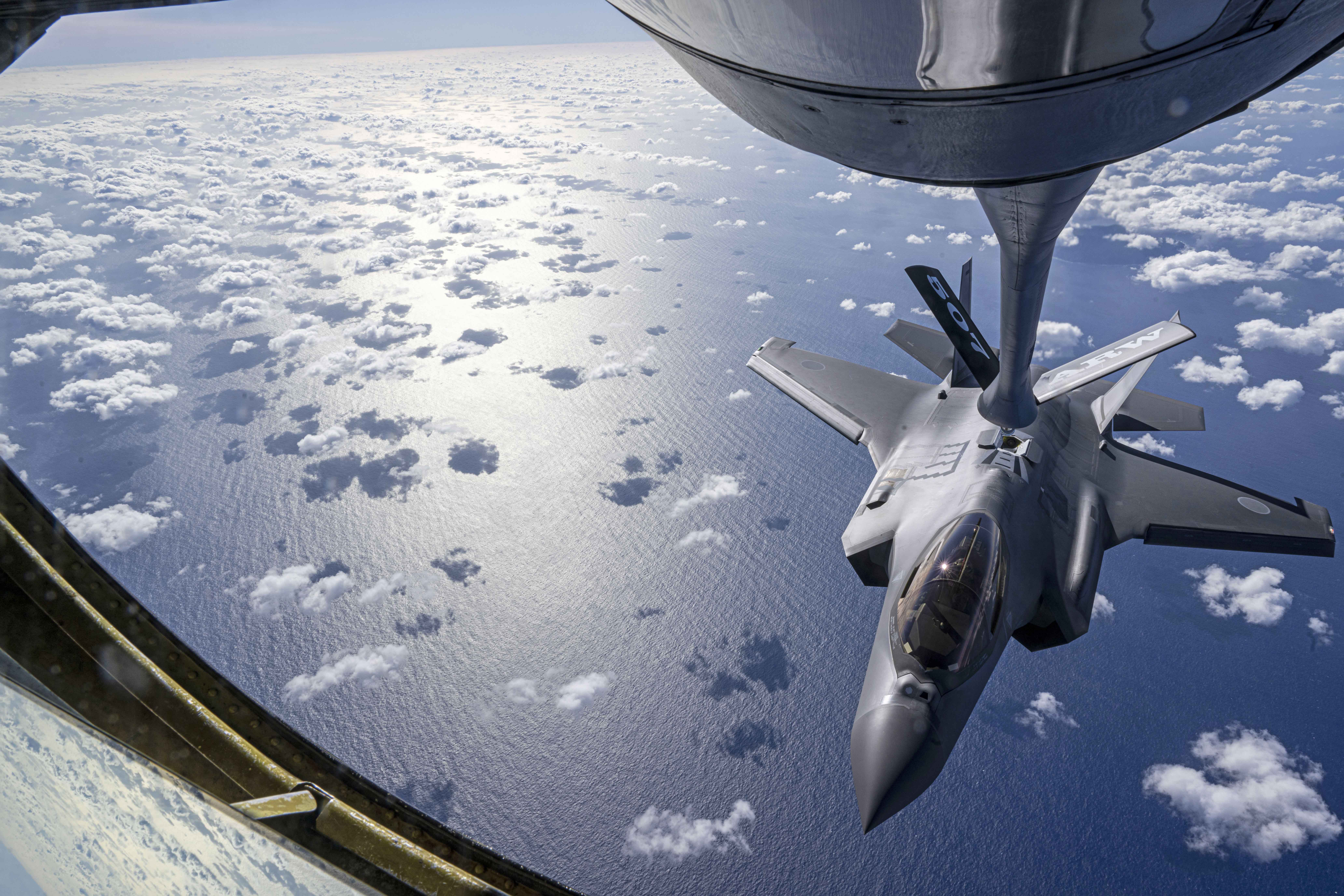
JASDF F-35A Lightning II prepares to receive fuel from a USAF KC-135 Stratotanker in February 2025.

The F-35A is the conventional take-off and landing (CTOL) variant intended for the USAF and other air forces. It is the smallest, lightest version and capable of 9 g, the highest of all variants.

Although the F-35A currently conducts aerial refueling via the boom and receptacle method, the aircraft can be modified for probe-and-drogue refueling if needed by the customer. A drag chute pod can be installed on the F-35A, with the Royal Norwegian Air Force being the first operator to adopt it. The F-35A has a tailhook designed to stop the aircraft during emergency situations. Unlike the more robust unit of the carrier-based F-35C, the F-35A's tailhook is a single-use device.

=== F-35B ===
The F-35B is the short take-off and vertical landing (STOVL) variant of the aircraft. Similar in size to the A variant, the B sacrifices about a third of the A variant's fuel volume to accommodate the shaft-driven lift fan (SDLF). This variant is limited to 7 g. Unlike other variants, the F-35B has no landing hook. The "STOVL/HOOK" control instead engages conversion between normal and vertical flight. The F-35B is capable of Mach 1.6 (1,960 km/h; 1,220 mph) and can perform vertical and/or short take-off and landing (V/STOL).

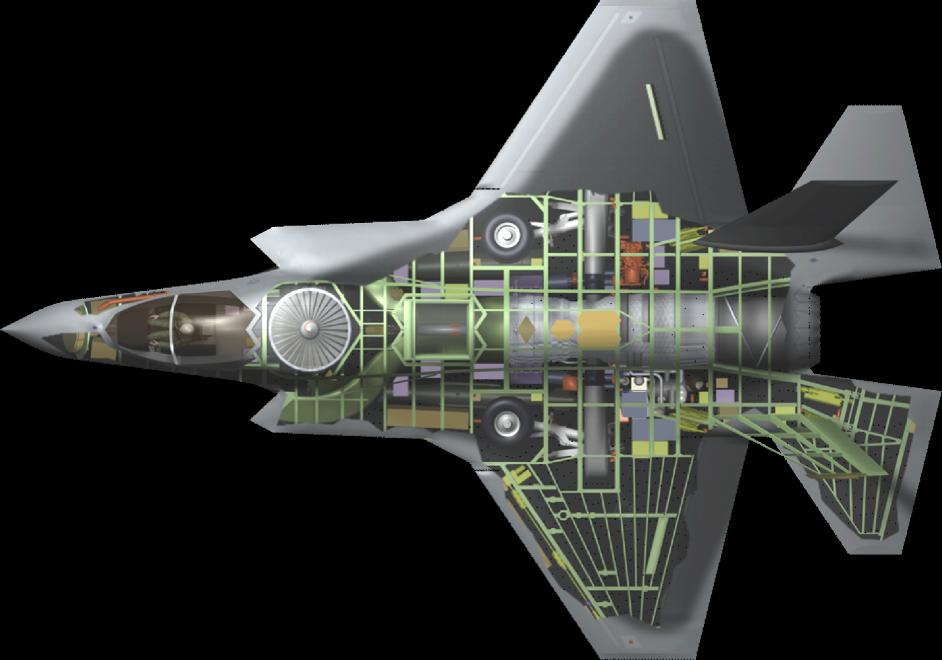
F-35B cutaway with lift fan

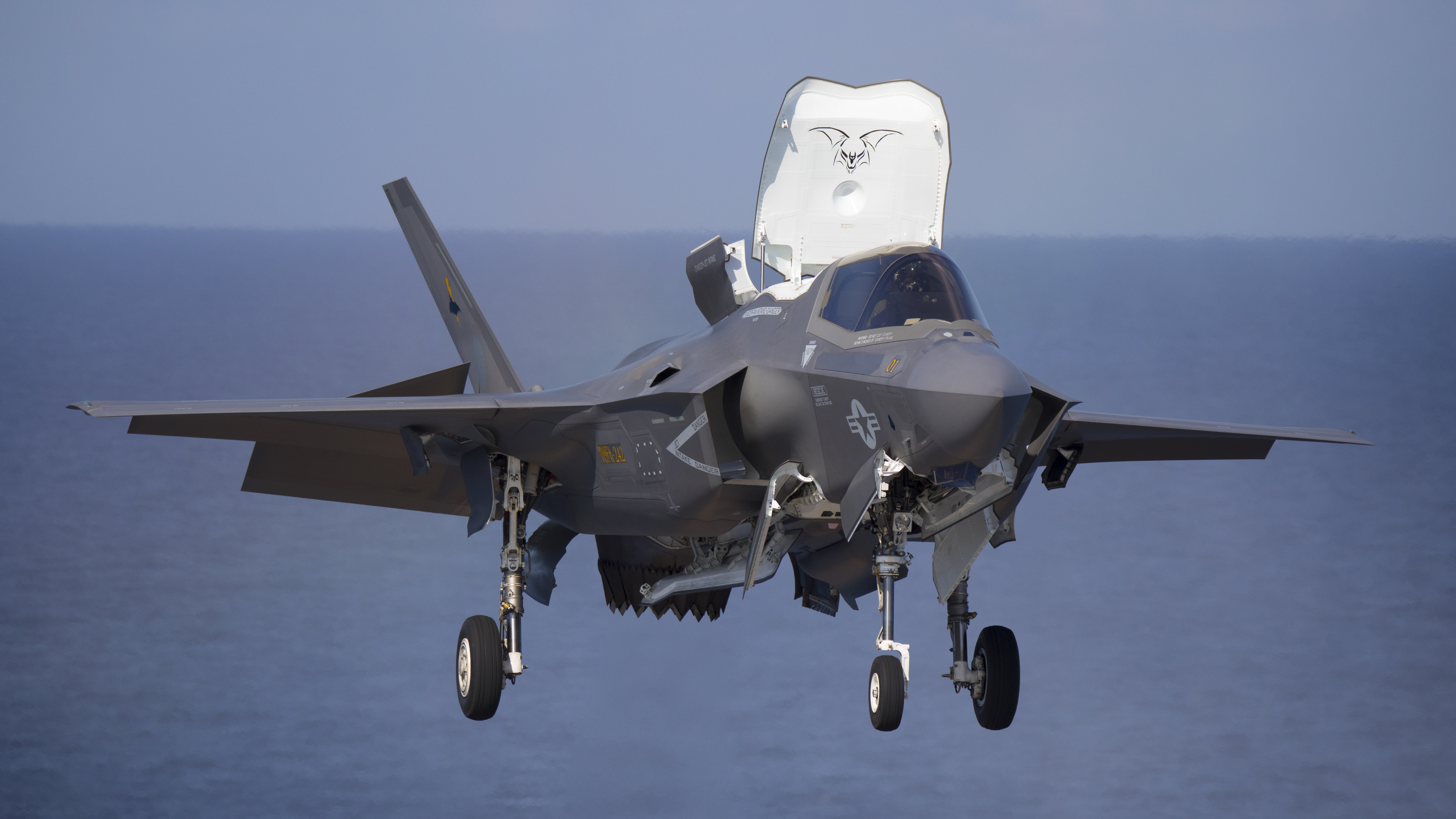
US Marine Corps F-35B conducting a vertical landing on JS Izumo (note the rotated nozzle and the lift fan vent duct)

=== F-35C ===
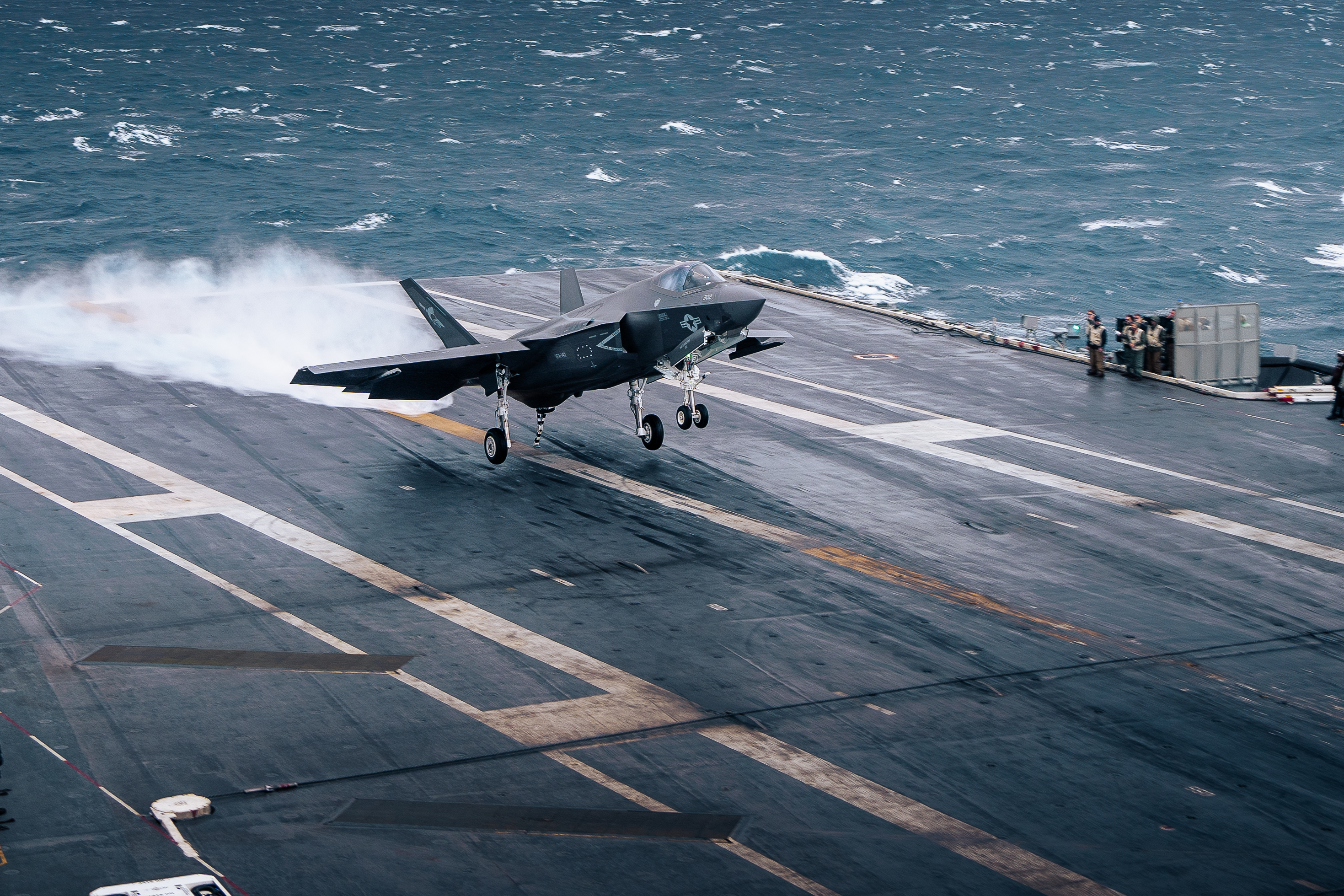
A US Navy F-35C conducting a landing on the USS George Washington.

The F-35C is the carrier-based variant of the aircraft, designed for catapult-assisted take-off and barrier-arrested recovery (CATOBAR) operations from aircraft carriers. Compared to the F-35A, the F-35C incorporates several modifications to meet the specific demands of carrier operations. These include larger wings with foldable wingtips to reduce the aircraft's footprint for storage, enlarged control surfaces for improved handling at low speeds, a more robust tailhook for repeated use with carrier arrestor cables, a twin-wheel nose gear, and reinforced landing gear to withstand the stresses of arrested landings. The increased wing area also allows for lower landing speeds and improves both range and payload capacity. The F-35C is limited to a maximum load factor of 7.5 g.

=== F-35I "Adir" ===
The F-35I Adir (Hebrew: אדיר, meaning "Awesome", or "Mighty One") is an F-35A with unique Israeli modifications. The US initially refused to allow such changes before permitting Israel to integrate its own electronic warfare systems, including sensors and countermeasures. The F-35I Adir is equipped with Israeli-made electronic warfare systems layered over the existing avionics and enhanced data gathering and processing capabilities. It comes with a specialized helmet designed for the aircraft's systems. While many of the details are classified, it is known that the helmet is equipped with a projector for each eye that feeds information directly to the pilots, eliminating the need to look down at cockpit instruments, and tracks the pilot's head movements to know where the pilot is looking as it relays data. The main computer has a plug-and-play function for add-on systems; proposals include an external jamming pod, and new Israeli air-to-air missiles and guided bombs in the internal weapon bays. Due to unique component requirements, the F-35I's wings are locally manufactured. A senior IAF official said that the F-35's stealth may be partly overcome within 10 years despite a 30 to 40-year service life, thus Israel's insistence on using its own electronic warfare systems. In 2010, Israel Aerospace Industries (IAI) considered a two-seat F-35 concept; an IAI executive noted that there was a "known demand for two seats not only from Israel but from other air forces." In 2008, IAI planned to produce conformal fuel tanks, as well as stealthy external fuel tanks; these were reportedly used during the June 2025 Israeli airstrikes against Iran.

It is widely speculated that the F-35I may have the capability to operate as a delivery vehicle for Israeli nuclear weapons, as it is a derivative of the nuclear-capable F-35A. In 2018, Israeli Channel 2 reported in 2014 that, following Lockheed Martin's nuclear-capable upgrades, allowing some F-35As' weapons systems and software to interface with US permissive action links, a senior US official had declined to comment on whether Israel had requested the same upgrade to its F-35Is.

=== Proposed variant ===
==== CF-35 ====
The Canadian CF-35 was a proposed variant that would differ from the F-35A through the addition of a drogue parachute and the potential inclusion of an F-35B/C-style refueling probe. In 2012, it was revealed that the CF-35 would employ the same boom refueling system as the F-35A. One alternative proposal would have been the adoption of the F-35C for its probe refueling and lower landing speed; however, the Parliamentary Budget Officer's report cited the F-35C's limited performance and payload as being too high a price to pay. Following the 2015 Federal Election, the Liberal Party, whose campaign had included a pledge to cancel the F-35 procurement, formed a new government and commenced an open competition to replace the existing CF-18 Hornet. The CF-35 variant was deemed too expensive to develop, and was never considered. The Canadian government decided not to pursue any other modifications in the Future Fighter Capability Project, and instead focused on the potential procurement of the existing F-35A variant.

On 28 March 2022, the Canadian Government began negotiations with Lockheed Martin for 88 F-35As to replace the aging fleet of CF-18 fighters starting in 2025. The aircraft are reported to cost up to CA$19bn total with a life-cycle cost estimated at CA$77bn over the course of the F-35 program. On 9 January 2023, Canada formally confirmed the purchase of 88 aircraft. The initial delivery to the Royal Canadian Air Force in 2026 will be 4 aircraft, followed by 6 aircraft each in 2027–2028, and the rest to be delivered by 2032. The additional characteristics confirmed for Canadian F-35As included the drag chute pod for landings at short/icy arctic runways, as well as the 'sidekick' system, which allows the CF-35 to carry up to 6 x AIM-120D missiles internally (instead of the typical internal capacity of 4 x AIM-120 missiles on other variants).

=== New export variant ===
In December 2021, it was reported that Lockheed Martin was developing a new variant for an unspecified foreign customer. The Department of Defense released US$49 million in funding for this work.

== Operators ==
Operates F-35A, F-35B and F-35C variants (United States) Operates F-35A and F-35B variants (Italy, Japan) Operates F-35A variant only (Australia, Belgium, Canada, Denmark, Finland, Germany, Netherlands, Norway, Poland, South Korea) Operates F-35B variant and awaiting F-35A delivery (United Kingdom) Operates F-35I variant only (Israel) Awaiting delivery (F-35A: Czech Republic, Greece, Romania, Switzerland; F-35A & F-35B: Singapore)

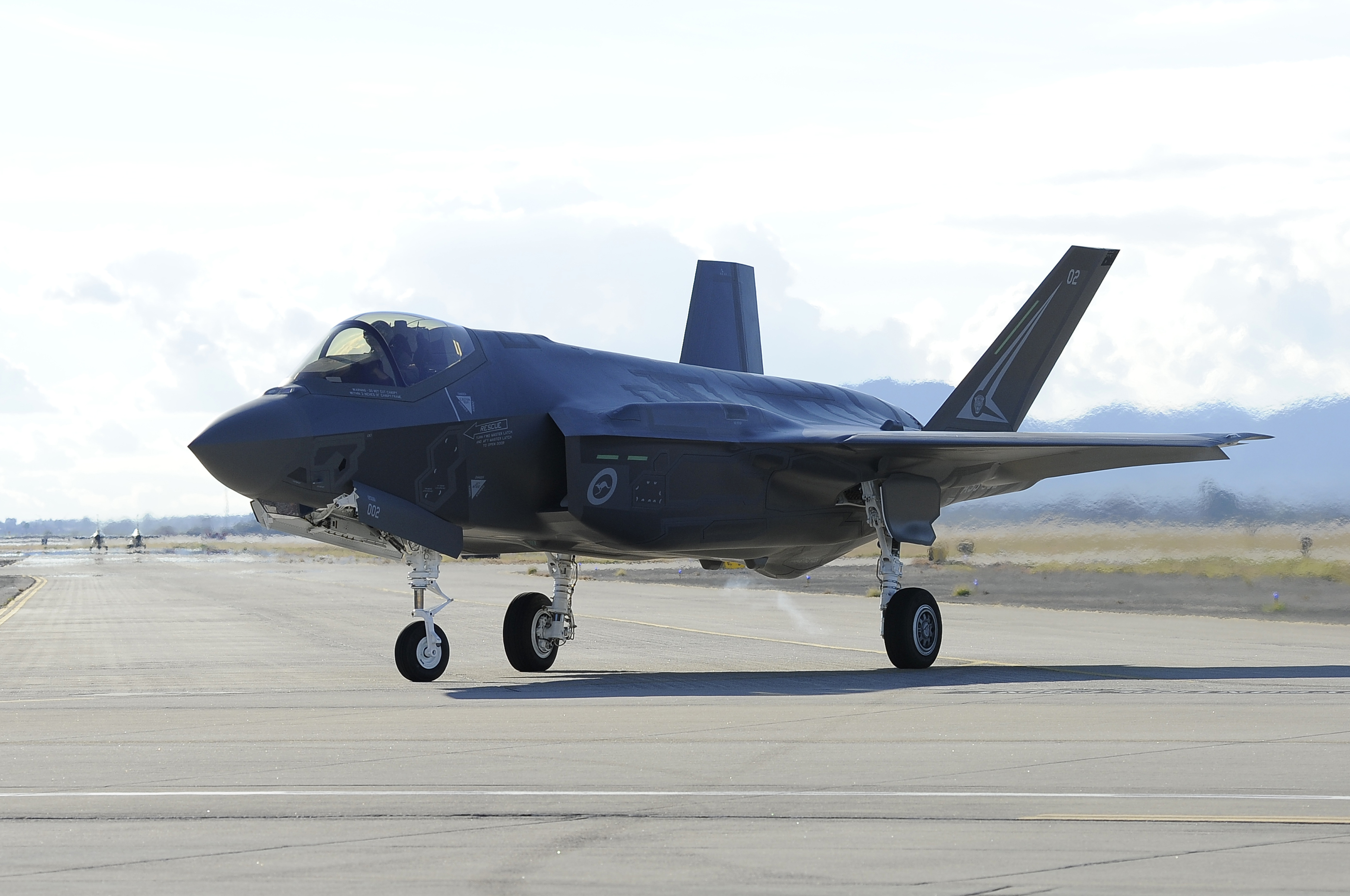
One of the RAAF's first two F-35As in December 2014

Australia

- Royal Australian Air Force – All 72 F-35As ordered were delivered as of December 2024.

Belgium

- Belgian Air Force – 12 delivered, of which 8 trainer aircraft are based at Luke Air Force Base in the United States. 34 F-35As planned in 2018 as of 2019, order for 11 additional F-35As pending.

Canada

- Royal Canadian Air Force – 88 F-35As (Block 4) ordered on 9 January 2023. Canada has paid for 30 aircraft to be delivered between 2026 and 2029. The plan was for the remainder to be delivered by 2032, but Canada decided in early 2025 to review the remaining 58 aircraft, possibly replacing them with Saab Gripen. A preliminary audit indicated that the program's cost had escalated to $27.7 billion from an initial $19 billion. The first eight aircraft will be based at Luke Air Force Base for pilot training. The aircraft are to replace CF-18s delivered in the 1980s. Canada's first two CF-35As were delivered in October 2026.

Denmark

- Royal Danish Air Force – 21 F-35As delivered (including 6 stationed at Luke Air Force Base for training) of the 43 planned for the RDAF as of October 2025.

Finland

- Finnish Air Force – In 2022, ordered 64 F-35A Block 4s via the HX Fighter Program to replace F/A-18 Hornets. During early 2026, eight F-35As were delivered to Ebbing Air National Guard Base (Arkansas, US) for initial pilot training program starting in January 2026. The next patch of eight F-35As are to be delivered to Finland by the end of September 2026. The first Finnish F-35As are delivered in TR-3 configuration.

Germany

- German Air Force – In 2022, ordered 35 F-35As for delivery starting in 2026. As of 2024, an order for an additional 10 was being considered. German F-35s will also replace the older Panavia Tornados in carrying the B61 nuclear bomb. Its first jet was delivered on 18 September 2026.

Israel

- Israeli Air Force – 48 F-35I "Adir"s delivered as of January 2026. Includes one F-35 testbed aircraft for indigenous Israeli weapons, electronics, and structural upgrades, designated AS-15. A total of 100 ordered.

Italy

- Italian Air Force – 24 F-35As and 8 F-35Bs delivered as of April 2025, of 75 F-35As and 20 F-35Bs ordered for the Italian Air Force.
- Italian Navy – 6 delivered as of September 2024, of 20 F-35Bs ordered for the Italian Navy.

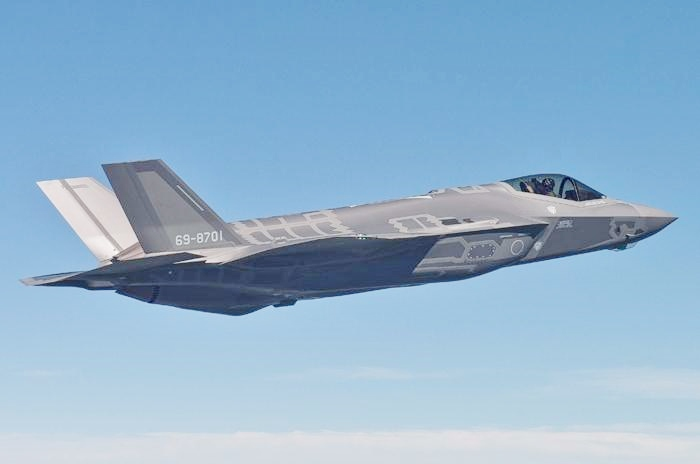
A Japan Air Self-Defense Force F-35A in flight

Japan

- Japan Air Self-Defense Force – 47 F-35As and F-35Bs delivered and operational as of December 2025 with a total order of 147, including 105 F-35As and 42 F-35Bs.

Netherlands

- Royal Netherlands Air and Space Force – 48 F-35As delivered and operational, of which 8 trainer aircraft are based at Luke Air Force Base in the US. 58 F-35As ordered in total. The RNLASF is the second air force with a 5th gen-only fighter fleet after the retirement of its F-16s.

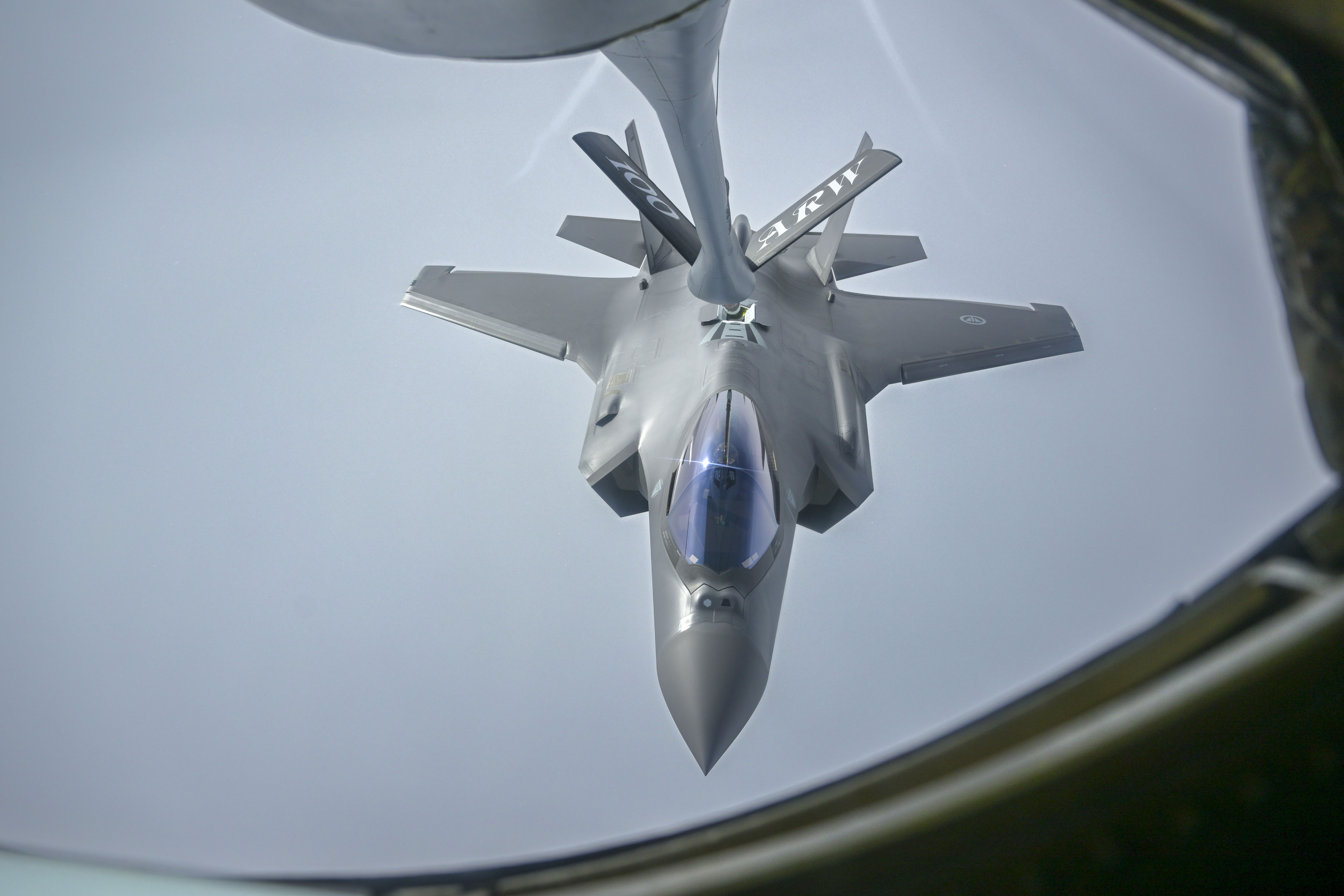
An F-35A Lightning II of the Royal Norwegian Air Force refueled by a KC-135 Stratotanker over the UK in September 2024

Norway

- Royal Norwegian Air Force – 52 F-35As delivered. They differ from other F-35As through the addition of a drogue parachute.

Poland

- Polish Air Force – 32 F-35A "Husarz" Block 4 jets with "Technology Refresh 3" software update and drogue parachutes ordered, with 8 delivered as of 2025. There are plans to order an additional 32 F-35s, which will comprise two squadrons. The first domestic flights of the F-35 by Polish pilots took place in February 2025, signaling the start of the country's use of the aircraft.

South Korea

- Republic of Korea Air Force – 40 F-35As ordered and delivered as of January 2022, with 25 more ordered in September 2023.

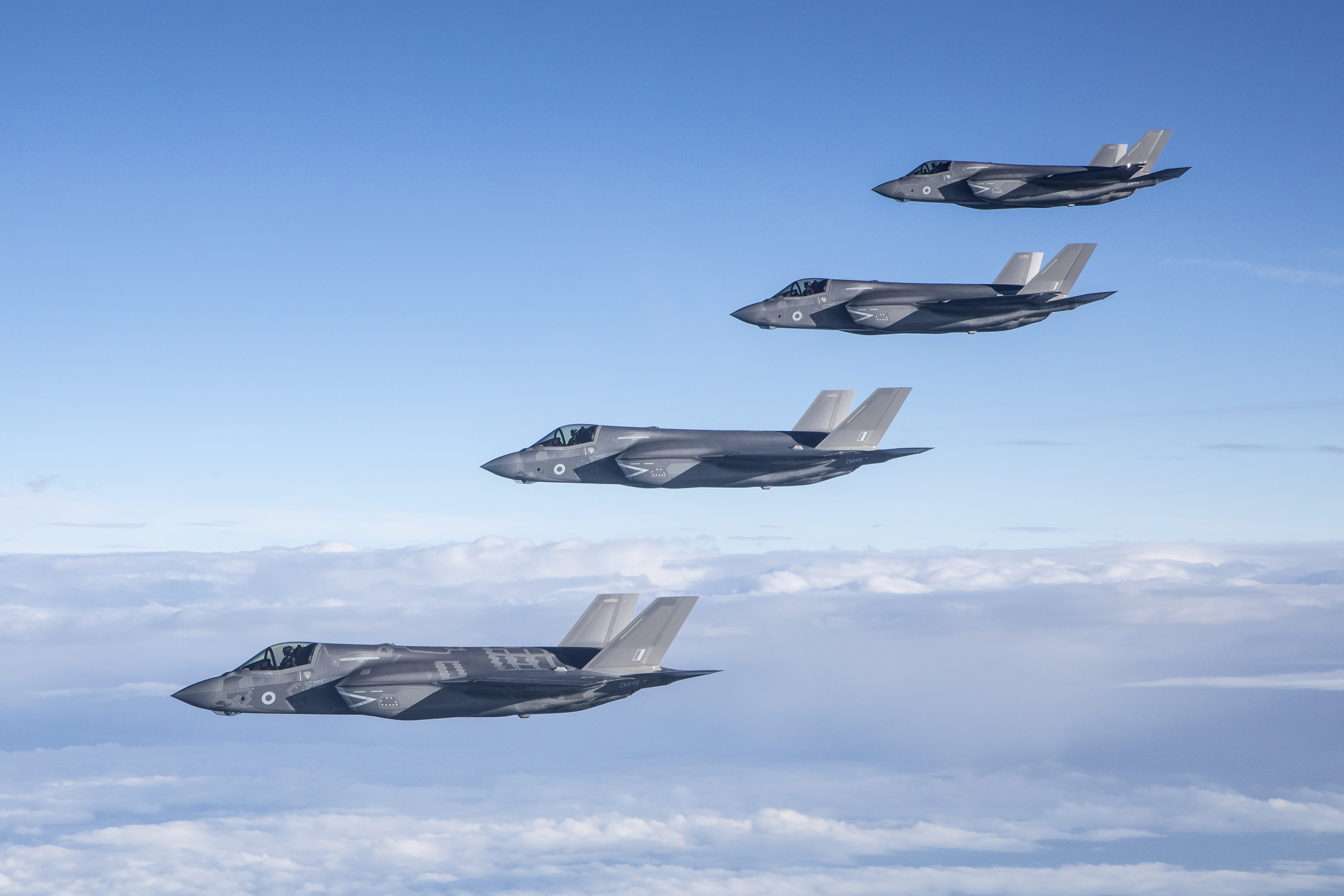
First four RAF F-35Bs on a delivery flight to RAF Marham, June 2018

United Kingdom

- Royal Air Force and Royal Navy (owned by the RAF but jointly operated) – 48 F-35Bs received, of which 47 are operational after the loss of one aircraft in November 2021. As of 2018, three of the UK's aircraft were in the US being used for testing and training. The first order of 48 was completed in 2026. A total of 138 are planned to be procured during the lifetime of the program. While the UK was originally expected to only order the F-35B, in June 2025 the UK announced plans to procure 12 F-35As, enabling the UK to join NATO's nuclear mission due to the F-35A's ability to carry B61 nuclear bombs internally, alongside 15 F-35Bs. With the completion of the initial order of 48 aircraft, a secondary order of 27 aircraft (12 F-35As and 15 F-35Bs) is expected to be procured by 2033.

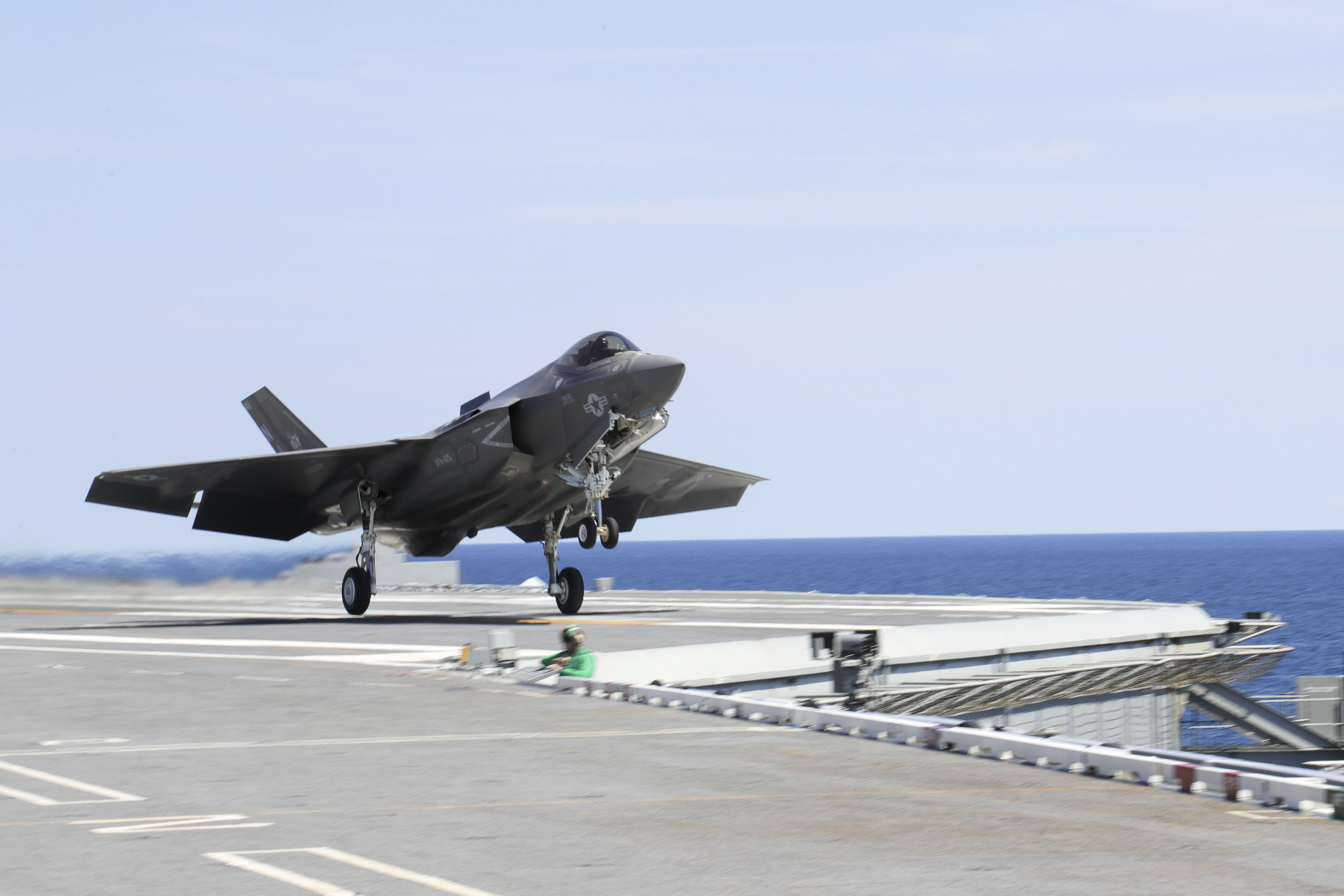
USN F-35C performs a touch-and-go landing aboard USS Abraham Lincoln.

United States

At least 850 were ordered in 2026 for the branches of the United States Armed Forces, to be delivered over the next 10 years.

- United States Air Force – 400+ delivered, with 1,763 F-35As planned.
- United States Marine Corps – 112 F-35B/Cs delivered, with 280 F-35Bs and 140 F-35Cs planned.
- United States Navy – 110+ delivered, with 273 F-35Cs planned.

=== Future operators ===
Czech Republic

- Czech Air Force – On 29 June 2023, the US State Department announced the approval of a possible sale to the Czech Republic of F-35 aircraft, munitions and related equipment worth up to $5.62 billion. On 29 January 2024, the Czech government signed a memorandum of understanding with the US to buy 24 F-35As. In September 2024, the Czech Republic signed a contract for F-35A logistics support.

Greece

- Hellenic Air Force – In 2024, Greece ordered 20 F-35As for delivery in late 2027 to early 2028, with an option to buy 20 more. The Greek F-35A production for 20 aircraft will "begin" with Lot 20, with full production starting in 2027, first delivery at the end of 2028, while the arrival of the first aircraft in Greece is expected for 2030, as per the VP for Strategy and Business Development and the VP for Customer Requirements of Lockheed Martin Aeronautics. The date has changed for November 2029 as United States Secretary of State Marco Rubio will meet up with Kyriakos Mitsotakis in the 7 September 2026 to discuss so speed up the processe for Greece to receive the F-35's.

Romania

- Romanian Air Force – Romania signed a contract for 32 F-35As worth $6.5 billion on 21 November 2024, planning to buy 48 F-35As in two phases – a first phase of 32 and a second phase of 16. The first eight aircraft are scheduled to arrive in Romania in 2032, with deliveries continuing through the 2030s.

Singapore

- Republic of Singapore Air Force – 8 F-35As and 12 F-35Bs on order as of February 2024. The first 4 F-35Bs are to be delivered in 2026, while the other 8 are to be delivered in 2028. The 8 F-35As are expected to arrive by 2030.

Switzerland

- Swiss Air Force – 36 F-35As ordered to replace the current F-5E/F Tiger II and F/A-18C/D Hornet. Deliveries will begin in 2027 and conclude in 2030. In September 2025, it was announced that Lockheed failed to meet the contract price of $7.55B, and that it would be increased by $1.63B. As a result, the Swiss decided to reduce the order to a lower number of planes in December 2025. In January 2026, it was reported that the support infrastructure was also behind schedule and over budget, according to Switzerland's federal auditors.

=== Potential operators ===
Morocco

- Royal Moroccan Air Force – As of October 2025, Morocco has entered into negotiations with the United States for the acquisition of the F-35 Lightning II stealth multirole fighter for its air force. These discussions have been ongoing for several months, with documents indicating that Israel has granted its approval in principle for the sale. This authorization is provided within the framework of the Qualitative Military Edge, a clause of the Arms Export Control Act requiring that no arms sale in the region compromise Israel's military superiority. If finalized, the agreement would make Morocco the first African and Arab nation to operate F-35s.

Portugal

- Portugal – The F-35 has been offered to Portugal to replace its ageing fleet of 28 F16 fighters. Other possible candidates include: Eurofighter Typhoon, Gripen E, and Dassault Rafale.

Saudi Arabia

- Royal Saudi Air Force – It was announced in November 2025 that Saudi Arabia would procure 48 F-35As. It is likely that the F-35As operated by the RSAF will lack some more advanced features found on Israel's fleet, to maintain the Qualitative Military Edge, with some American missiles not to be offered to Saudi Arabia. On 17 September 2026, the US Department of State announced that it had approved a potential F-35 sale to Saudi Arabia.

Chile

- Chilean Air Force – During an announcement ceremony, the Chilean Air Force commander stated that research had begun to integrate a fifth-generation fighter to replace its aging fleet of 11 Northrop F-5 aircraft — reported by Chilean media as referring to the US-built F-35 Lightning II, as no other fifth-generation fighter is realistically available to Chile given its Western defense alignment.

=== Cancelled operators ===
Republic of China

- Republic of China Air Force – Taiwan has repeatedly expressed interest in buying the F-35 to deter and fight off any Chinese attempt to seize the island by force. It is reportedly most interested in the F-35B STOVL variant, which could enable the Republic of China Air Force to continue operations if China bombed the island's runways. But the US has repeatedly rebuffed this interest – for example, in March 2009, September 2011, early 2017 and March 2018. The usual reason given is to prevent provoking Beijing. But in April 2018, another reason for US reluctance surfaced: concern that Chinese spies within the Taiwanese Armed Forces might gain classified data about the aircraft. In November 2018, it was reported that Taiwanese military leaders had abandoned efforts to buy the F-35 and would instead buy Rafale or a larger number of F-16V Viper aircraft. The decision was reportedly motivated by concerns about industry independence, cost, and espionage.

Egypt

- Egyptian Air Force – Despite US President Donald Trump's announcement to sell 20 F-35As to Egypt in 2018, strong objections from the US Department of Defense and Israel led to the deal's cancellation.

India

- Indian Air Force – In February 2025, Trump offered the F-35 to Prime Minister Narendra Modi of India, which as of March 2025, was also considering a competing offer from Russia's Sukhoi Su-57. However, in late July 2025, Bloomberg reported that India has already rejected its requirement of the aircraft. While the Indian Ministry of Defence has not confirmed any of this, the Indian Ministry of External Affairs maintained that India has not held any formal discussions about the aircraft's procurement with the US.

Spain

- Spanish Air and Space Force – The Spanish government explored the acquisition of the F-35 through requests for information and preliminary analysis, but in August 2025 the option was formally ruled out.

Thailand

- Royal Thai Air Force – 8 or 12 F-35s are planned to replace the F-16A/B Block 15 ADFs in service. On 12 January 2022, Thailand's cabinet approved a budget for the first four F-35As, estimated at 13.8 billion baht in FY2023. On 22 May 2023, the United States Department of Defense implied it will turn down Thailand's bid to buy F-35s, and instead offer F-16 Block 70/72 Viper and F-15EX Eagle II fighters, a Royal Thai Air Force source said.

Turkey

- On 11 July 2002, Turkey became a Level 3 partner of the F-35 Joint Strike Fighter (JSF) development program, and on 25 January 2007, Turkey officially joined the production phase of the JSF program, agreeing to purchase a total of 116 F-35 Lightning II aircraft (100 F-35A CTOLs for the Turkish Air Force and 16 F-35B STOVLs for the TCG Anadolu). Future purchases have been banned by the US following Turkey's decision to buy the S-400 missile system from Russia, with contracts canceled by early 2020. Six of Turkey's 30 ordered F-35As were completed as of 2019 (they are still kept in a hangar in the United States as of 2023 and so far haven't been transferred to the USAF, despite a modification in the 2020 fiscal year defense budget by the US Congress which gives authority to do so if necessary), and two more were at the assembly line in 2020. The first four F-35As were delivered to Luke Air Force Base in 2018 and 2019 for the training of Turkish pilots. On 20 July 2020, the US government had formally approved the seizure of eight F-35As originally bound for Turkey and their transfer to the USAF, together with a contract to modify them to USAF specifications. The US has not refunded the $1.4 billion payment made by Turkey for purchasing the F-35As as of January 2023. On 1 February 2024, the United States expressed willingness to readmit Turkey into the F-35 program if Turkey agrees to give up its S-400 system. After US President Trump and Turkish President Erdoğan's phone call in March 2025, news was reported in the press that Trump could approve the sale of F-35s to Turkey if Turkey resolves the S-400 issue. Following a meeting between Trump and Erdoğan at the White House on September 25, 2025, it was revealed that one of the proposed solutions, reported by the media in October 2025, stipulates the relocation of Turkey's S-400 missile systems to the Nakhchivan Autonomous Republic, an exclave of Azerbaijan which has a five-mile (8.0 km) border with Turkey, as a precondition for lifting the Countering America's Adversaries Through Sanctions Act (CAATSA) sanctions and approving the sale and transfer of F-35s and Patriot surface-to-air missile systems to Turkey. On 24 June 2026, during a joint press conference with NATO Secretary General Mark Rutte at the White House, Trump stated that he would "probably do something that will make Turkey very happy" regarding Turkey's request to rejoin the F-35 program, ahead of the NATO Summit in Ankara. The same day, Reuters reported that the US administration was expected to approve the export of General Electric F110 engines for Turkey's KAAN fighter program before the summit, despite opposition in US Congress. Turkey's Ministry of National Defense announced that diplomatic consultations with US counterparts on the country's potential return to the F-35 program and the removal of related restrictions were continuing. US officials, however, emphasized that any policy shift would depend on addressing concerns regarding Turkey's possession of the Russian S-400 air defense system.

United Arab Emirates

- United Arab Emirates Air Force – Up to 50 F-35As planned. On 27 January 2021, the Biden administration temporarily suspended the F-35 sales to the UAE. After pausing the bill to review the sale, the Biden administration confirmed it would move forward with the deal on 13 April 2021. In December 2021, the UAE withdrew from purchasing F-35s as they did not agree to the additional terms of the transaction from the US. On 14 September 2024, a senior UAE official said that the UAE does not expect to resume talks with the US about the F-35.

== Accidents and notable incidents ==
The F-35 is a statistically safe military aircraft, described as being twice as safe as the F-16. Still, since 2014, more than a dozen have crashed or otherwise been involved in incidents that have killed or severely injured people or destroyed the aircraft. Some were caused by operator error; others by mechanical problems, some of which set the entire program back.

As of August 2026, there were 12 crashes causing the loss of an F-35 airframe, primarily in the US.

The only known fatal crash of an F-35 occurred on 9 April 2019, when a Japan Air Self-Defense Force F-35A crashed in the Pacific Ocean east of Aomori Prefecture at an estimated speed of Mach 0.9. The accident report attributed the cause to the pilot's spatial disorientation. The pilot's remains and the flight recorder were salvaged, although no data could be retrieved, while the wreckage itself was not salvaged.

On 31 July 2026, a US Marine Corps F-35B crashed and was destroyed at Marine Corps Air Station Miramar in San Diego, California. The pilot ejected safely.

=== 2026 Iran war ===
On 19 March 2026, during the 2026 Iran war, a US F-35 flying a combat mission over Iran was forced to make an emergency landing at a regional air base. The Islamic Revolutionary Guard Corps said it had "seriously damaged" the F-35. It was the first time an F-35 sustained damage from enemy fire since it was deployed in combat in 2018. It was also the first Iranian interception of any US aircraft. The aircraft landed safely.

On 15 September 2026, the Congressional Budget Office published the report "Estimating the Cost of Combat Operations Against Iran", which listed an F-35A "battle loss" which it estimated could be repaired for $50 million or replaced for the original unit cost of $120 million.

== UK F-35 exports to Israel and legal challenge ==
The United Kingdom's participation in the F-35 program became the subject of political and legal controversy during the Gaza war. In September 2024, the British government suspended 29 arms export licenses after concluding that there was a clear risk that the items concerned might be used to commit or facilitate serious violations of international humanitarian law in Gaza. Licenses supplying components to the multinational F-35 program were exempted where the government could not identify Israel as the final end user. Ministers argued that suspending all UK supplies to the program would disrupt the global F-35 supply chain and have serious consequences for the defense of the United Kingdom, NATO allies and other international partners.

The Palestinian human rights organization Al-Haq challenged the F-35 exemption in judicial review proceedings. In June 2025, the UK High Court dismissed the challenge. The court noted that the structure of the multinational program meant that F-35 aircraft supplied to Israel would contain UK-manufactured components, but held that the central question involved the government's continued participation in a multilateral defense program regarded by ministers as vital to national and international security. It concluded that this "acutely sensitive and political issue" was for the executive, accountable to Parliament and the electorate, rather than the courts.

Al-Haq sought to appeal the ruling, arguing that the exemption was incompatible with the UK's international law obligations and its own arms-export controls. In November 2025, the Court of Appeal refused permission for a further appeal, leaving the F-35 exemption in place.

== Specifications (F-35A) ==
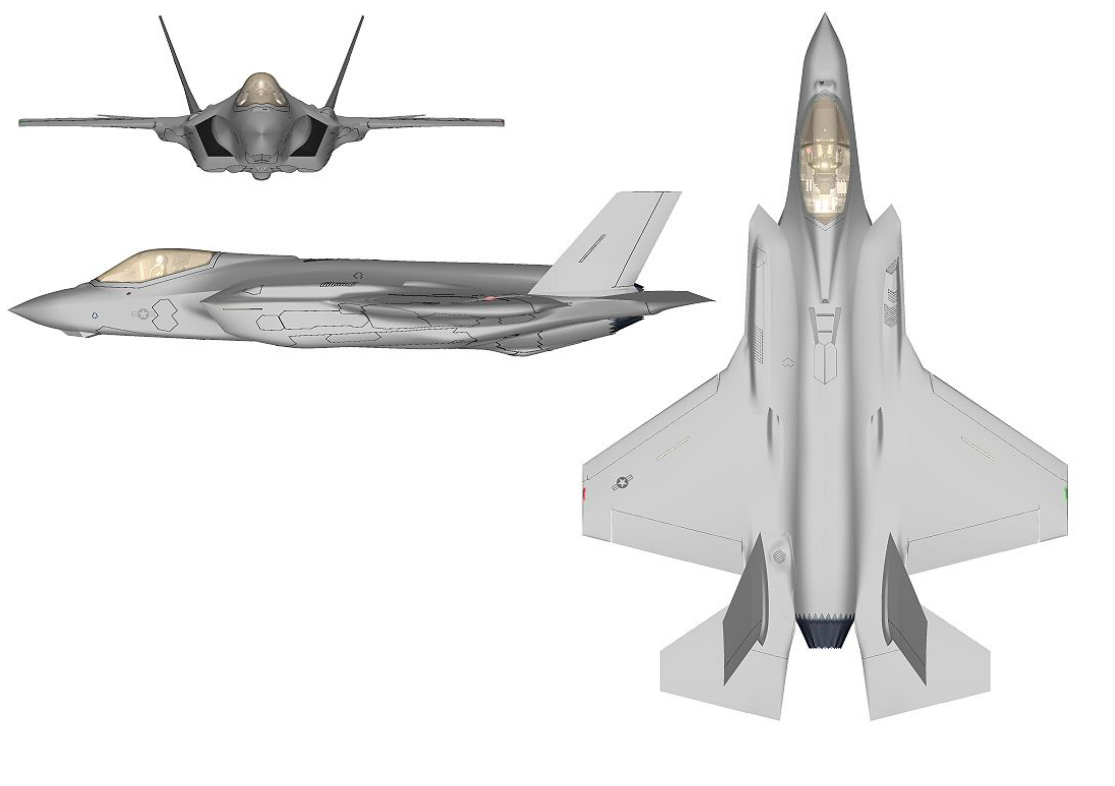
F-35A three-view drawing

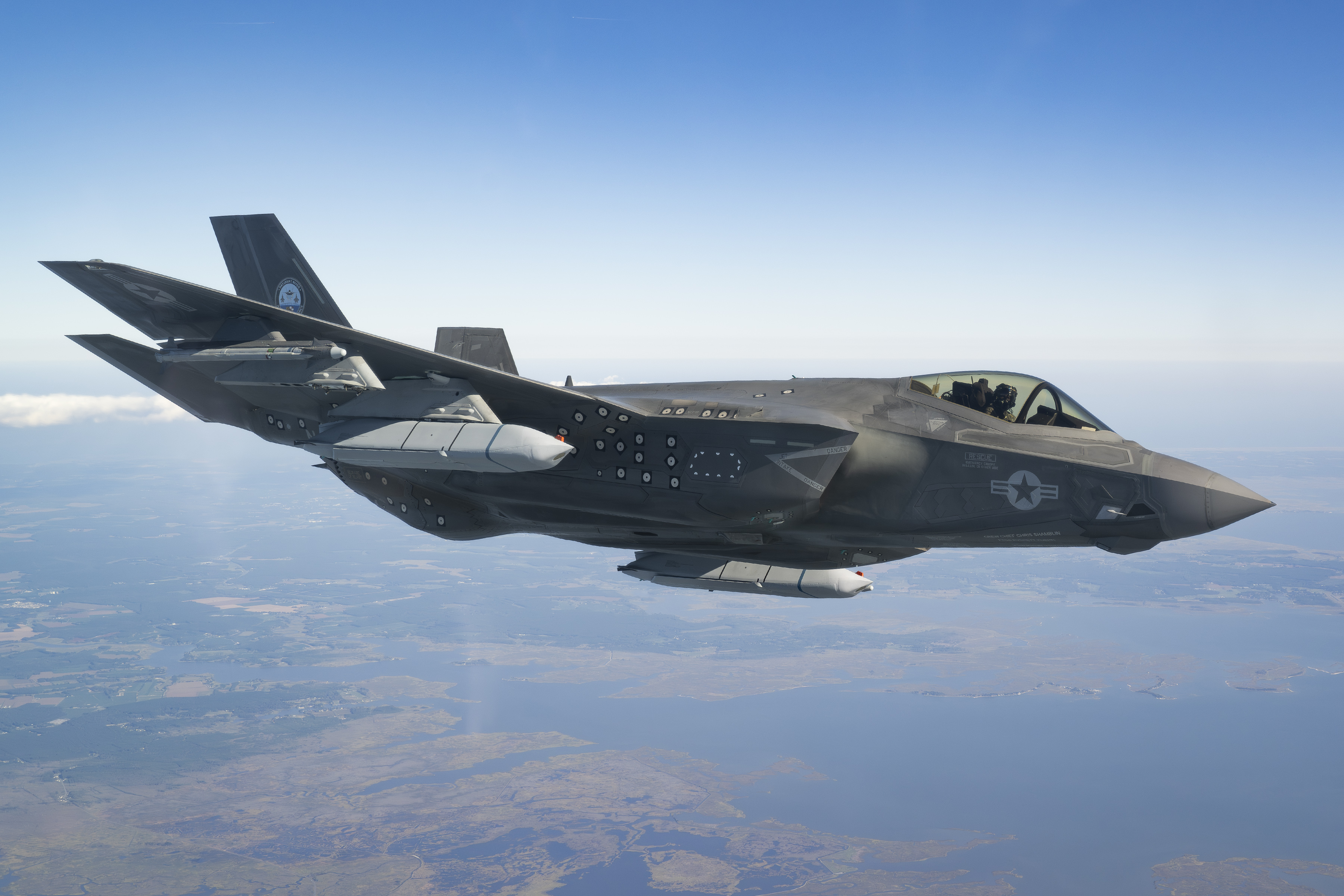
F-35C with external hardpoints

Data from Lockheed Martin: F-35 specifications, Lockheed Martin: F-35 weaponry, Lockheed Martin: F-35 Program Status, F-35 Program brief, FY2019 Select Acquisition Report (SAR), Director of Operational Test & Evaluation

General characteristics

- Crew: 1
- Length: 51.4 ft (15.7 m)
- Wingspan: 35 ft (11 m)
- Height: 14.4 ft (4.4 m)
- Wing area: 460 sq ft (43 m^{2})
- Aspect ratio: 2.66
- Empty weight: 29,300 lb (13,290 kg)
- Gross weight: 49,540 lb (22,471 kg)
- Max takeoff weight: 65,918 lb (29,900 kg)
- Fuel capacity: 18,250 lb (8,278 kg) internal
- Powerplant: 1 × Pratt & Whitney F135-PW-100 afterburning turbofan, 28,000 lbf (120 kN) thrust dry, 43,000 lbf (190 kN) with afterburner

Performance

- Maximum speed: Mach 1.6 at high altitude (1,228 mph / 1,976 km/h)
  - Mach 1.06, 700 knots (806 mph; 1,296 km/h) at sea level
- Range: 1,500 nmi (1,700 mi, 2,800 km)
- Combat range: 669 nmi (770 mi, 1,239 km) interdiction mission (air-to-surface) on internal fuel
  - 760 nmi (870 mi; 1,410 km), air-to-air configuration on internal fuel
- Service ceiling: 50,000 ft (15,000 m)
- g limits: +9.0
- Wing loading: 107.7 lb/sq ft (526 kg/m^{2}) at gross weight
- Thrust/weight: 0.87 at gross weight (1.07 at loaded weight with 50% internal fuel)

Armament

- Guns: 1 × 25 mm GAU-22/A 4-barrel rotary cannon, 180 rounds (Note: F-35B and F-35C have the cannon in an external pod with 220 rounds.)
- Hardpoints: 4 × internal stations, 6 × external stations on wings with a capacity of 5,700 pounds (2,600 kg) internal, 15,000 pounds (6,800 kg) external, 18,000 pounds (8,200 kg) total weapons payload, with provisions to carry combinations of:
  - Missiles:
    - Air-to-air missiles:
      - AIM-9X Sidewinder
      - AIM-120 AMRAAM
      - AIM-132 ASRAAM
      - AIM-260 JATM (being integrated)
      - AIM-424 LRAAM (For F-35C)
      - MBDA Meteor (Block 4, for F-35B, not before 2027)
    - Air-to-surface missiles:
      - AGM-88G AARGM-ER (Block 4)
      - AGM-158 JASSM
      - SPEAR 3 (Block 4, in development, integration contracted)
      - AGM-88J Stand-in Attack Weapon (SiAW)
    - Anti-ship missiles:
      - AGM-158C LRASM (being integrated)
      - Joint Strike Missile (being integrated)
      - Hypersonic Attack Cruise Missile (Australia; after 2027)
  - Bombs:
    - Joint Direct Attack Munition
    - Paveway
    - Precision-guided glide bomb:
      - AGM-154 JSOW
      - GBU-39 Small Diameter Bomb
      - GBU-53/B StormBreaker
    - B61 mod 12 nuclear bomb

Avionics

- AN/APG-81 or AN/APG-85 (Lot 17 onwards) AESA radar
- AN/AAQ-40 Electro-Optical Targeting System
- AN/AAQ-37 Electro-Optical Distributed Aperture System
- AN/ASQ-239 Barracuda electronic warfare/electronic countermeasures system
- AN/ASQ-242 CNI suite, which includes
  - Harris Corporation Multifunction Advanced Data Link (MADL) communication system
  - Link 16 data link
  - SINCGARS
  - An IFF interrogator and transponder
  - HAVE QUICK
  - AM, VHF, UHF AM, and UHF FM Radio
  - GUARD survival radio
  - A radar altimeter
  - An instrument landing system
  - A TACAN system
  - Instrument carrier landing system
  - A JPALS
  - TADIL-J JVMF/VMF

=== Differences among variants ===
	F-35A CTOL	F-35B STOVL	F-35C CV CATOBAR
Length	51.4 ft (15.7 m)	51.2 ft (15.6 m)	51.5 ft (15.7 m)
Wingspan	35 ft (10.7 m)	35 ft (10.7 m)	43 ft (13.1 m)
Height	14.4 ft (4.39 m)	14.3 ft (4.36 m)	14.7 ft (4.48 m)
Wing Area	460 sq ft (42.74 m^{2})	460 sq ft (42.74 m^{2})	668 sq ft (62.06 m^{2})
Empty weight	29,300 lb (13,300 kg)	32,472 lb (14,729 kg)	34,581 lb (15,686 kg)
Internal fuel	18,250 lb (8,278 kg)	13,500 lb (6,123 kg)	19,750 lb (8,958 kg)
Weapons payload	18,000 lb (8,160 kg)	15,000 lb (6,800 kg)	18,000 lb (8,160 kg)
Max takeoff weight	70,000 lb (31,800 kg) class	60,000 lb (27,200 kg) class	70,000 lb (31,800 kg) class
Range	>1,200 nmi (2,200 km)	>900 nmi (1,700 km)	>1,200 nmi (2,200 km)
Combat radius on internal fuel	669 nmi (1,239 km)	505 nmi (935 km)	670 nmi (1,241 km)
Thrust/weight • full fuel: • 50% fuel:	0.87; 1.07	0.90; 1.04	0.75; 0.91
g limit	+9.0	+7.0	+7.5

== See also ==
Related development

- Lockheed Martin X-35 – Concept demonstrator aircraft for Joint Strike Fighter program

Aircraft of comparable role, configuration, and era

- Chengdu J-20 – Chinese fifth-generation fighter aircraft
- Shenyang J-35 – Chinese fifth-generation fighter aircraft
- Sukhoi Su-57 – Russian fifth-generation fighter aircraft
- TAI TF Kaan – Turkish fifth-generation fighter under development by Turkish Aerospace Industries
- KAI KF-21 Boramae – Advanced multirole fighter aircraft under development by South Korea and Indonesia

Related lists

- List of fighter aircraft
- List of active United States military aircraft
- List of megaprojects, Aerospace
- List of military electronics of the United States
