= General Dynamics F-16 Fighting Falcon variants =

Specific model of the F-16 fighter aircraft family

F-16 Fighting Falcon
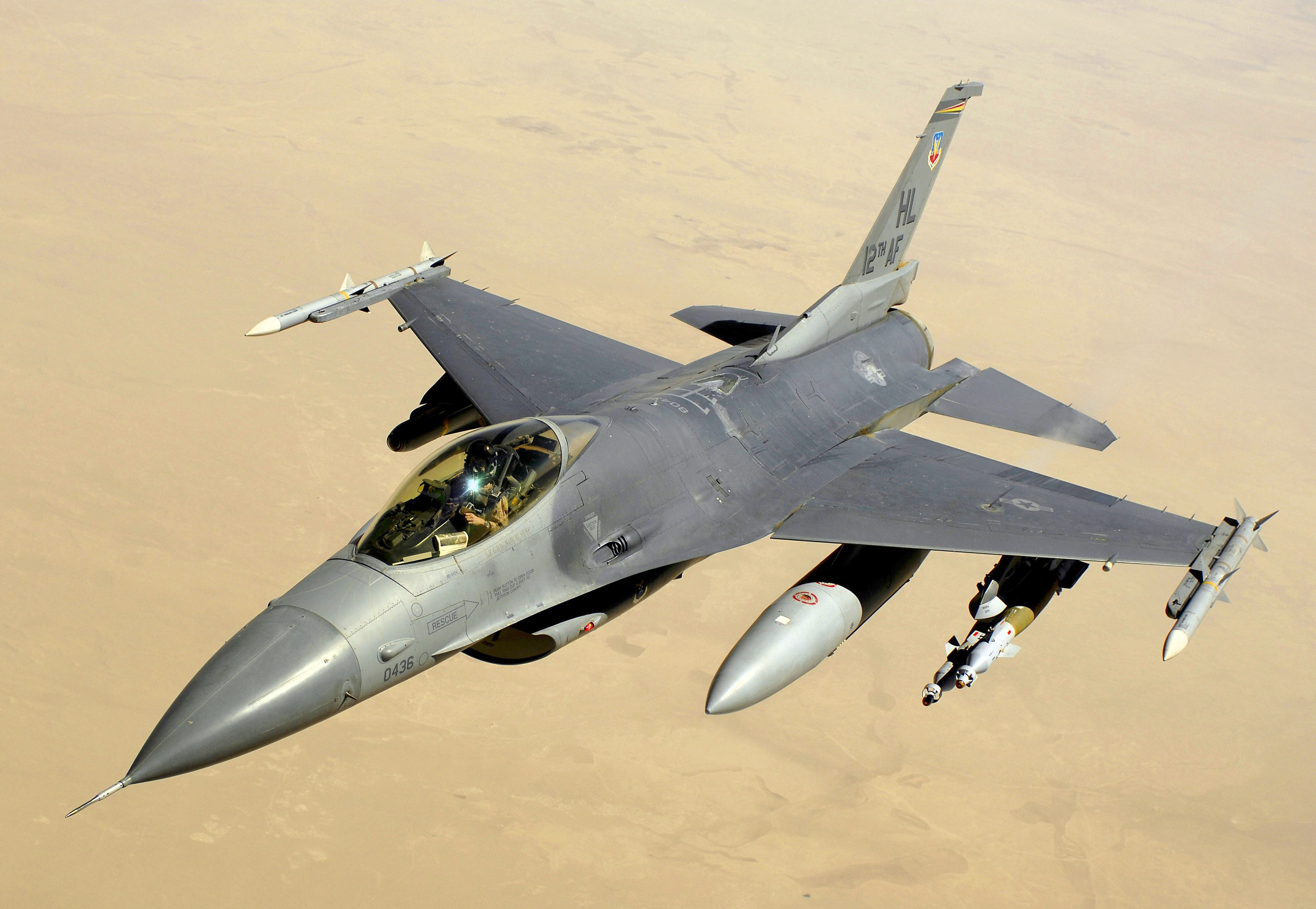
- A USAF F-16C in the skies over Iraq, 2008

General information
- Type: Multirole fighter aircraft
- National origin: United States
- Manufacturer: General Dynamics; Lockheed Martin
- Status: In service, in production
- Primary users: United States Air Force 25 other users (see operators page)
- Number built: 4,500+

History
- Introduction date: 17 August 1978
- First flight: 21 January 1974
- Variant: General Dynamics X-62 VISTA
- Developed into: Vought Model 1600; General Dynamics F-16XL; Mitsubishi F-2

The F-16 Fighting Falcon (commonly called "Viper") was manufactured by General Dynamics from 1974 to 1993, Lockheed Corporation from 1993 to 1995, and since 1995, it has been manufactured by Lockheed Martin. The F-16 variants, along with major modification programs and derivative designs significantly influenced by the F-16, are detailed below.

== Pre-production variants ==
=== YF-16 ===
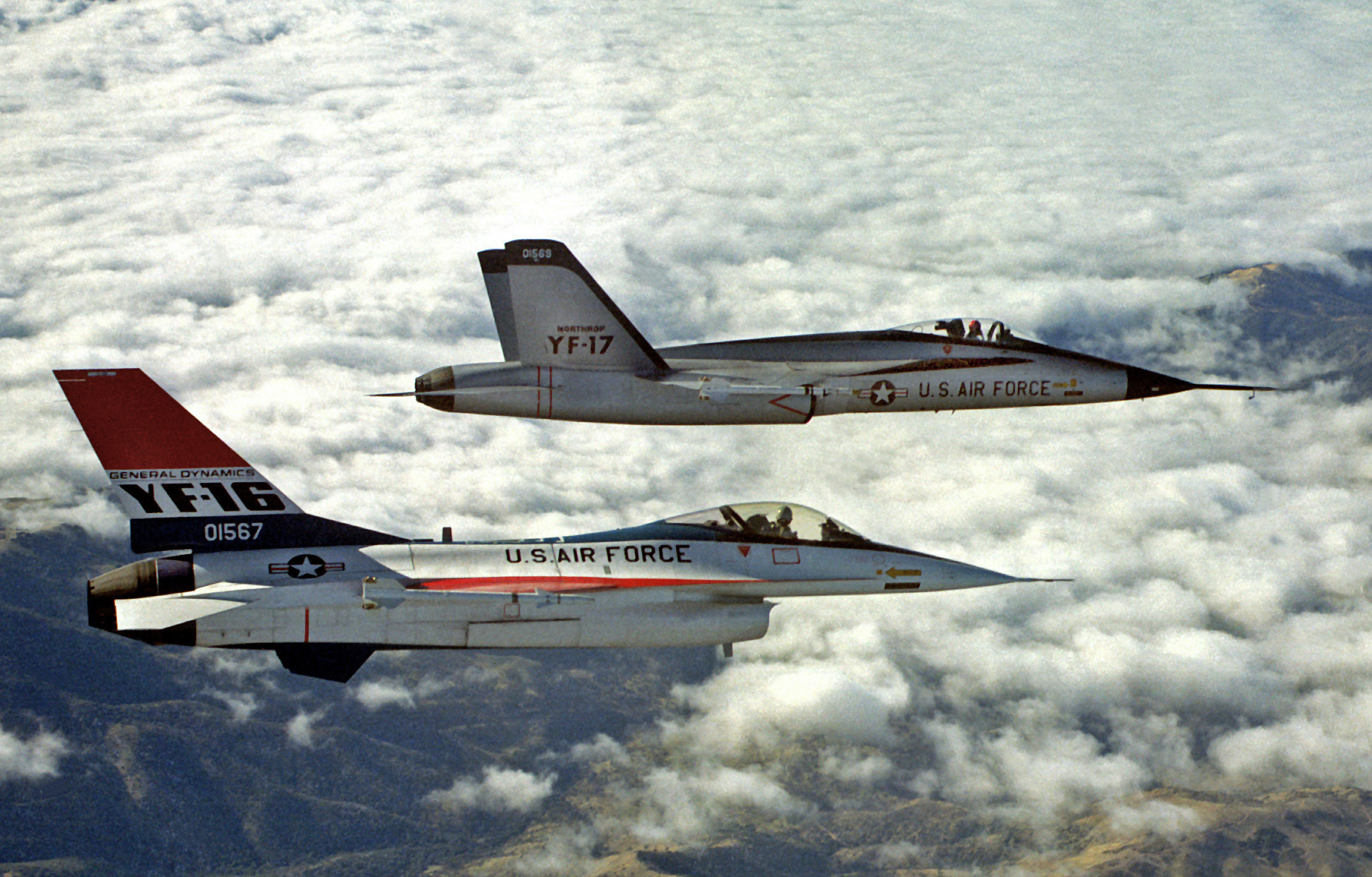
U.S. Air Force YF-16 and YF-17, 1982

Two single-seat YF-16 prototypes were built for the Light Weight Fighter (LWF) competition. The first YF-16 was rolled out at Fort Worth on 13 December 1973 and accidentally accomplished its first flight on 21 January 1974, followed by its scheduled "first flight" on 2 February 1974. The second prototype first flew on 9 March 1974. Both YF-16 prototypes participated in the flyoff against the Northrop YF-17 prototypes, with the F-16 winning the Air Combat Fighter (ACF) competition, as the LWF program had been renamed.

- 72-1567 - on display at the Virginia Air and Space Science Center in Hampton, Virginia.
- 72-1568 - under restoration for display at the Fort Worth Aviation Museum in Fort Worth, Texas.

=== F-16 FSD ===
In January 1975, the Air Force ordered eight full-scale development (FSD) F-16s – six single-seat F-16A and a pair of two-seat F-16B – for test and evaluation. The first FSD F-16A flew on 8 December 1976 and the first FSD F-16B on 8 August 1977. Over the years, these aircraft have been used as test demonstrators for a variety of research, development and modification study programs.

F-16A (FSD)

- 75-745 - modified as F-16/101 with GE F101 engine. Used as a travelling exhibit for USAF recruiting service.<
- 75-746 - Gate guard at McEntire ANGB, South Carolina.
- 75-747 - modified as F-16XL/B with cranked-arrow. On display at the Air Force Flight Test Museum at Edwards Air Force Base near Rosamond, California.
- 75-748 - on display at the Air Force Academy in Colorado Springs, Colorado.
- 75-749 - modified as F-16XL/A with cranked-arrow wing. In storage at the Air Force Flight Test Museum at Edwards Air Force Base near Rosamond, California.
- 75-750 - modified as AFTI test bed. In storage at the National Museum of the United States Air Force.

F-16B (FSD)

- 75-751 - in storage at the Air Force Flight Test Museum at Edwards Air Force Base near Rosamond, California.
- 75-752 - modified as Wild Weasel test bed, later modified as F-16/79 with GE J79. On display at the Frontiers of Flight Museum in Dallas, Texas.

== Main production variants ==
Blocks	Models	Engine
1–15	F-16A/B	PW F100-PW-200
15OCU, 20	F-16A/B	PW F100-PW-220
25,32,42	F-16C/D	PW F100-PW-220E
30,40	F-16C/D	GE F110-GE-100
50,70	F-16C/D/V	GE F110-GE-129
52,72	F-16C/D/V	PW F100-PW-229
60	F-16E/F	GE F110-GE-132

=== F-16A/B ===
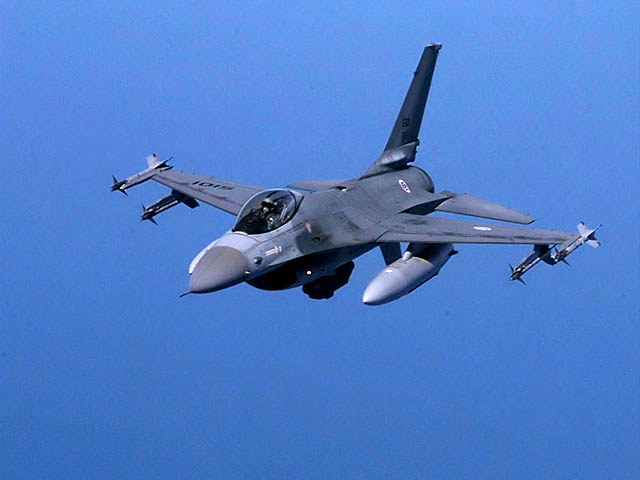
A Portuguese Air Force F-16A outfitted with AIM-9 Sidewinder missiles, AN/ALQ-131 ECM pod, and external fuel tanks.

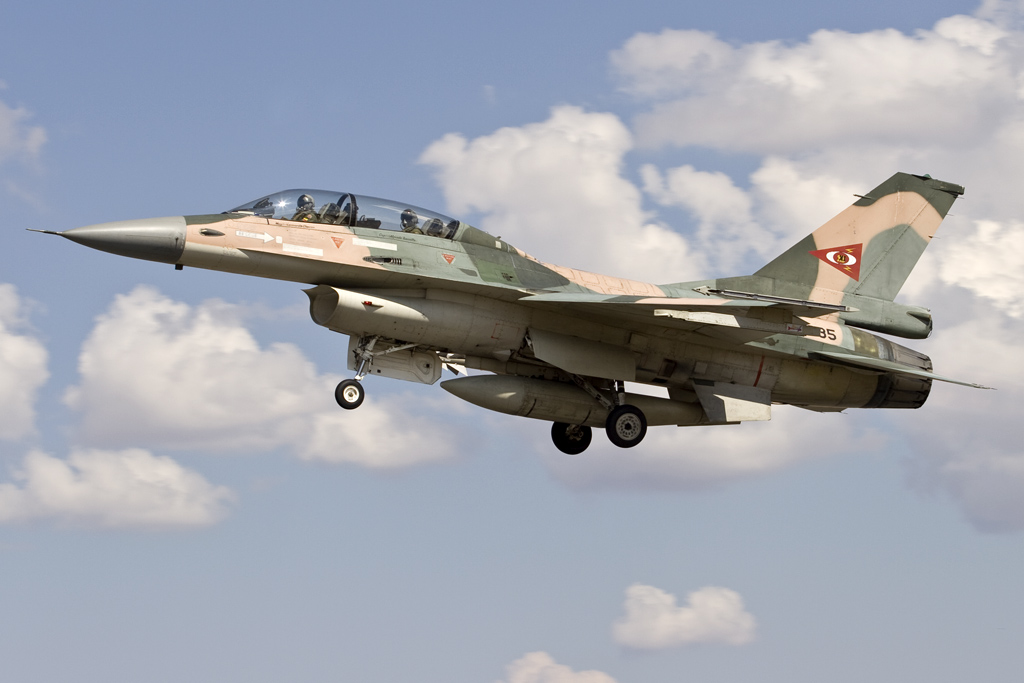
A Venezuelan Air Force F-16B

The F-16A (single seat) and F-16B (two seat) were initially equipped with the Westinghouse AN/APG-66 pulse-doppler radar, Pratt & Whitney F100-PW-200 turbofan, rated at 14,670 lbf (64.9 kN) and 23,830 lbf (106.0 kN) with afterburner. The USAF bought 375 F-16As and 125 F-16Bs, with delivery completed in March 1985.

==== F-16A/B Block 1/5/10 ====
Early blocks (Block 1/5/10) featured relatively minor differences between each. Most were later upgraded to the Block 10 configuration in the early 1980s. There were 94 Block 1, 197 Block 5, and 312 Block 10 aircraft produced. Block 1 is the early production model with the radome painted black.

It was discovered that the Block 1 aircraft's black radome became an obvious visual identification cue at long range, so the color of the radome was changed to the low-visibility grey for Block 5 aircraft. During the operation of F-16 Block 1, it was discovered that rainwater could accumulate in certain spots within the fuselage, so drainage holes were drilled in the forward fuselage and tail fin area for Block 5 aircraft.

The Soviet Union significantly reduced the export of titanium during the late 1970s, so the manufacturers of the F-16 used aluminum instead wherever practical. New methods were also used: the corrugated aluminum is bolted to the epoxy surface for Block 10 aircraft, replacing the old method of aluminum honeycomb being glued to the epoxy surface used in earlier aircraft.

The breakdown is as follows: 90 F-16A Block 1, 4 F-16B Block 1, 100 F-16A Block 5, 97 F-16B Block 5, 300 F-16A Block 10, and 12 F-16B Block 10. It is unclear how many of each type were produced, but these figures are generally reasonable. As mentioned above, 375 A-types and 125 B-types were delivered to the U.S. Air Force, and the remaining aircraft were exported.

==== F-16A/B Block 15 ====
The first major change in the F-16, the Block 15 aircraft featured larger horizontal stabilators, the addition of two hardpoints to the inlet chin, an improved AN/APG-66(V)2 radar, an extra aerial refueling light located on the vertical stabilizer, and increased capacity for the underwing hardpoints. The Block 15 also gained the Have Quick II secure UHF radio. To counter the additional weight of the new hardpoints, the horizontal stabilizers were enlarged by 30%. Furthermore, the lower UHF/IFF antenna, the lower threat warning antenna, the total air temperature probe and two ambient air sense ports, originally located on the inlet chin, were relocated due to the placement of the new hardpoints.

The Block 15 is the most numerous variant of the F-16, with 983 produced. Nine hundred F-16A Block 15s and eighty-three F-16B Block 15s were produced and rolled out, the last of which was delivered to the Royal Thai Air Force in 1996.

==== F-16A/B Block 20 ====
According to some sources, the F-16A/B variants for the Republic of China Air Force are designated F-16AM Block 20 and F-16BM Block 20. Other sources refer to them simply as F-16A/B Block 20 without reference to the "M" designation for Mid-Life Update. Block 20 added some F-16C/D block 50/52 capabilities: improved AN/APG-66(V)3 radar with added CW mode to guide two types of BVR missiles – AIM-7M Sparrow missiles and AIM-120 AMRAAM, carriage of AGM-84 Harpoon missiles, as well as the LANTIRN navigation and targeting pod. The Block 20 computers are significantly improved in comparison to that of the earlier versions that later integrated into post 1997 Block 50/52, and also getting color MFD. The Republic of China (Taiwan) received 150 F-16A/B Block 20 aircraft. Some sources refer to the F-16 Mid-Life Update as Block 20, but the Block 20 designation was specifically used for new-production jets with upgraded jets being referred to as MLU or Block 15 MLU. The breakdown is 100 F-16A Block 20 and 50 F-16B Block 20, but 10 A-models have been lost during missions. At one point, 14 aircraft were sent to the US mainland for training.

=== F-16C/D ===
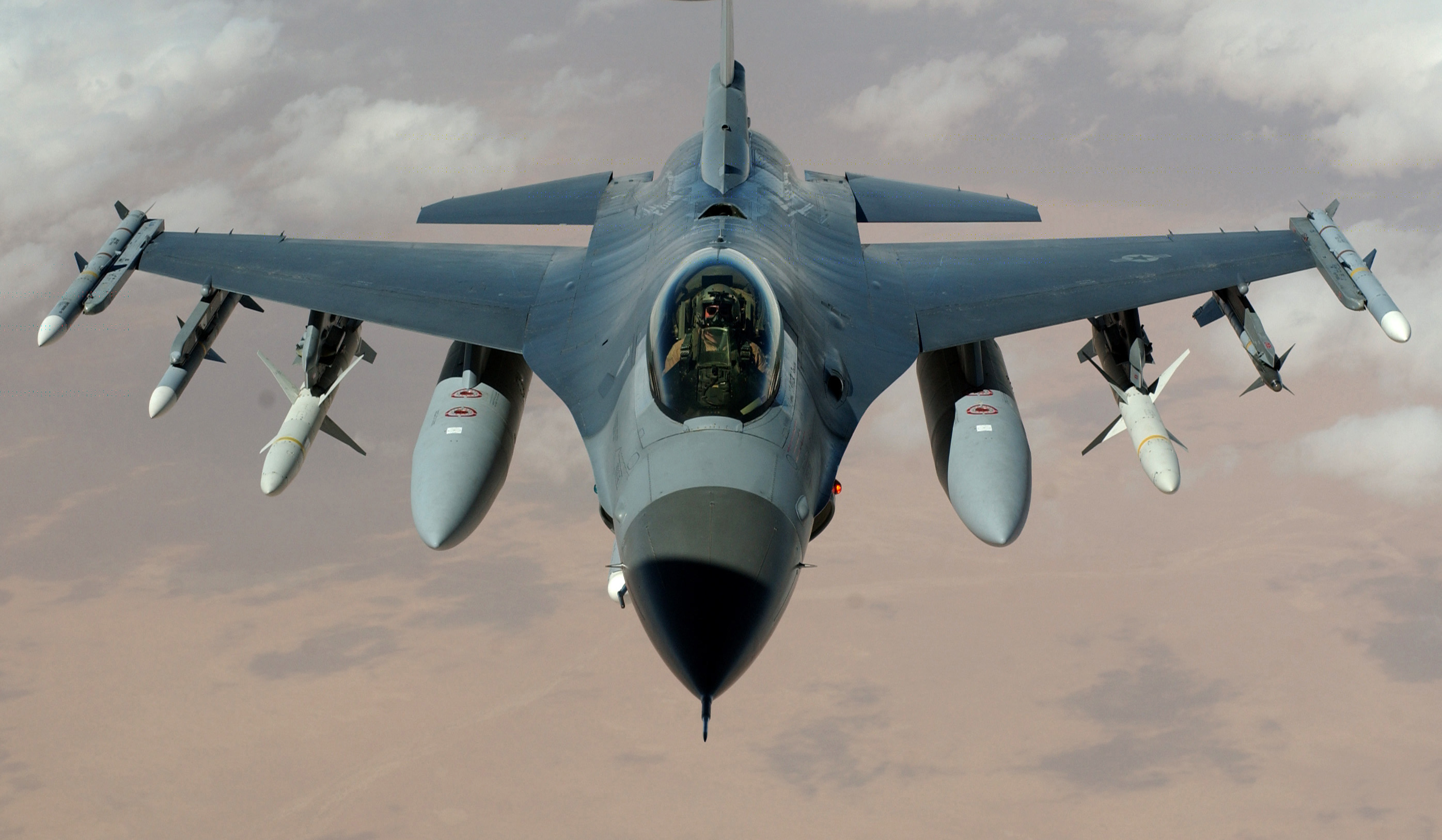
USAF F-16C

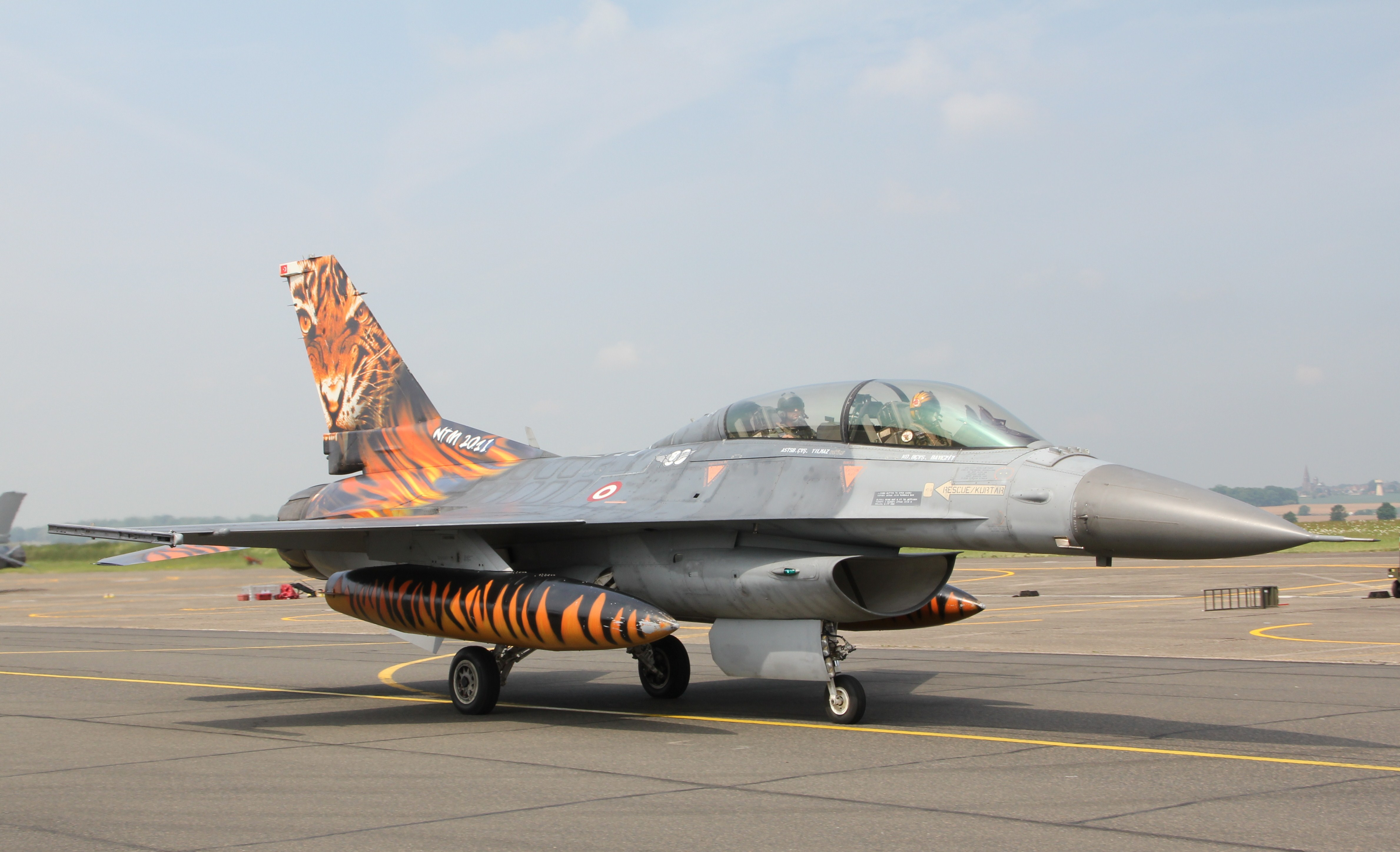
Turkish Air Force F-16D

F-16C (single seat) and F-16D (two seat). The final number of aircraft built and used by the US Air Force were 209 F-16C Block 25, 200 F-16C Block 30, 100 F-16C Block 32, 200 F-16C Block 40, 115 F-16C Block 42, 35 F-16D Block 25, 200 F-16D Block 30, 133 F-16D Block 32, 200 F-16D Block 40, and 100 F-16D Block 42. At this stage, the A/B models were retired and either exported, scrapped for parts, or mothballed and sent to storage facilities. Currently, with the introduction of the F-22 stealth fighter and the mass production of the F-35, the C/D models are being rapidly retired, and the current (2024) fleet remaining in the U.S. Air Force and National Guard consists of 123 F-16C Block 25, 200 F-16C Block 30, 100 F-16C Block 32, 200 F-16C Block 40, 115 F-16C Block 42, 37 F-16D Block 40, and 100 F-16D Block 42.

==== F-16C/D Block 25 ====
The Block 25 F-16C first flew in June 1984 and entered USAF service in September. The aircraft version is fitted with the Westinghouse AN/APG-68 radar and has improved precision night-attack capability. Block 25 introduced a very substantial improvement in cockpit avionics, including improved fire-control and stores management computers, an Up-Front Controls (UFC) integrated data control panel, data-transfer equipment, multifunction displays, radar altimeter, and many other changes. Block 25s were first delivered with the Pratt & Whitney F100-PW-200 engine and later upgraded to the Pratt & Whitney F100-PW-220E. With 209 Block 25 C-models and 35 D-models delivered, today the USAF's Air National Guard and Air Education and Training Command are the only remaining users of this variant. One F-16C, nicknamed the "Lethal Lady", had flown over 7,000 hours by April 2008.

==== F-16C/D Block 30/32 ====
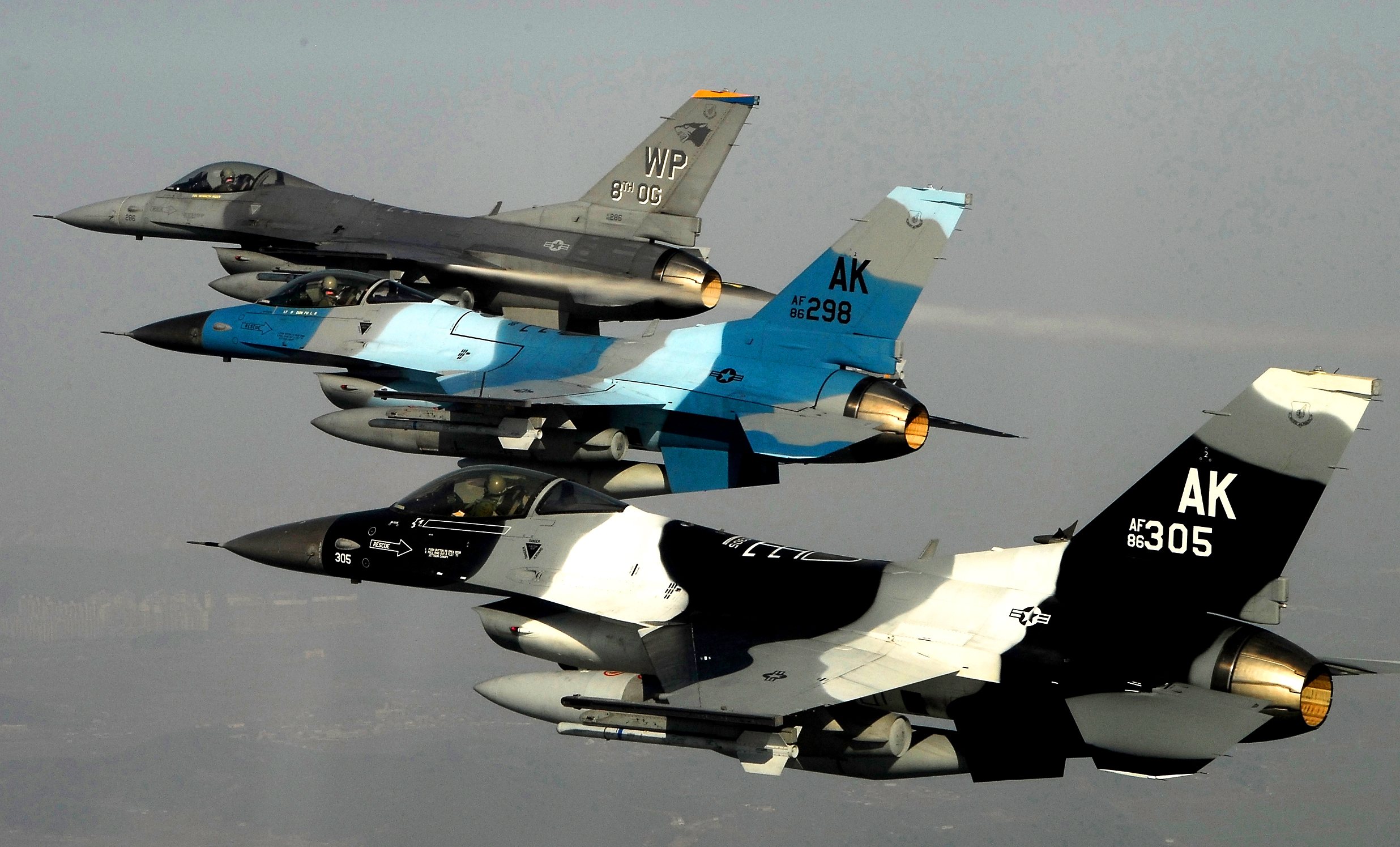
Three U.S. Air Force F-16 Block 30 aircraft fly in formation over South Korea, 2008

This was the first block of F-16s affected by the Alternative Fighter Engine project under which aircraft were fitted with the traditional Pratt & Whitney engines or, for the first time, the General Electric F110-GE-100. From this point on, blocks ending in "0" (e.g., Block 30) are powered by GE, and blocks ending in "2" (e.g., Block 32) are fitted with Pratt & Whitney engines. The first Block 30 F-16 entered service in 1987. Major differences include the carriage of the AGM-45 Shrike, AGM-88 HARM, and the AIM-120 missiles, which entered service in September 1991. From Block 30D, aircraft were fitted with larger engine air intakes (called a Modular Common Inlet Duct) for the increased-thrust GE engine. Since the Block 32 retained the Pratt and Whitney F100 engine, the smaller (normal shock inlet) was retained for those aircraft. 200 F-16C Block 30, 200 F-16D Block 30, 100 F-16C Block 32, and 133 F-16D Block 32 were built. Of these, only the early Block 30s were exported to six countries. The Block 32H/J aircraft assigned to the USAF Thunderbird flight demonstration squadron were built in 1986 and 1987 and are some of the oldest operational F-16s in the Air Force.

The Air National Guard procured many upgrades for their fleet of aging block 32s including the addition of improved inertial guidance systems, improved electronic warfare suite (AN/ALQ-213), and upgrades to carry the Northrop Grumman LITENING targeting pod. The standard Inertial Navigation Unit (INU) was first changed to a ring laser gyro, and later upgraded again to an Embedded GPS/INS (EGI) system which combines a Global Positioning System (GPS) receiver with an Inertial navigation system (INS). The EGI provided the capability to use Joint Direct Attack Munition (JDAM) and other GPS-aided munitions (see Block 50 list below). This capability, in combination with the LITENING targeting pod, greatly enhanced the capabilities of this aircraft. The sum of these modifications to the baseline Block 30 is commonly known as the F-16C++ (pronounced "plus plus") version.

==== F-16C/D Block 40/42 ====
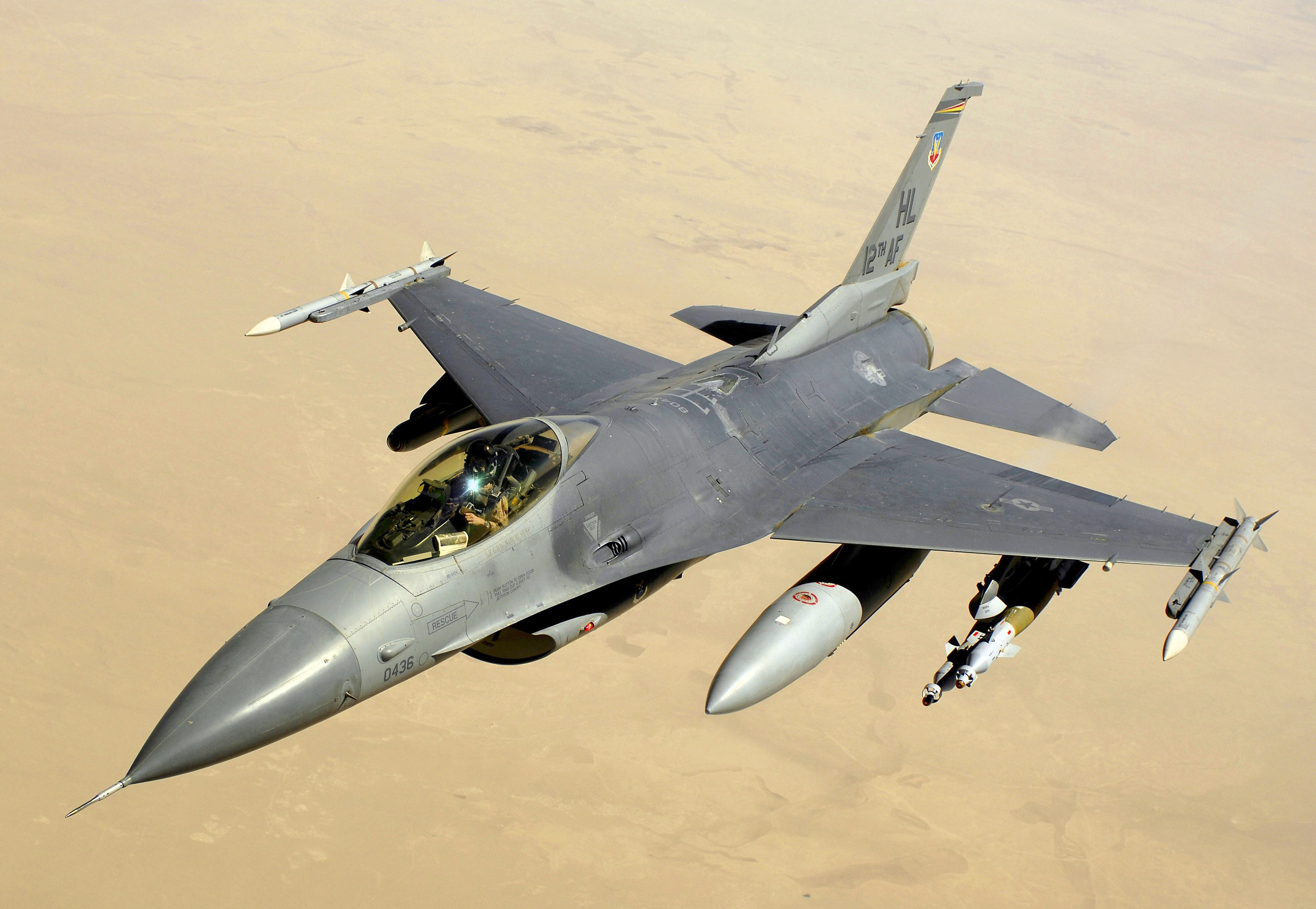
U.S. Air Force F-16C Block 40 over Iraq, 2008

Entering service in 1988, the Block 40/42 is the improved all-day/all-weather strike variant equipped with LANTIRN pod; also unofficially designated the F-16CG/DG, the night capability gave rise to the name "Night Falcons". This block features strengthened undercarriage for LANTIRN pods, an improved radar, and a GPS receiver. From 2002, the Block 40/42 increased the weapon range available to the aircraft including JDAM, AGM-154 Joint Standoff Weapon (JSOW), Wind-Corrected Munitions Dispenser (WCMD) and the (Enhanced) EGBU-27 Paveway "bunker-buster". Also incorporated in this block was the addition of cockpit lighting systems compatible with Aviator's Night Vision Imaging System (ANVIS) equipment. The USAF's Time Compliance Technical Order (TCTO) that added the night vision (NVIS)-compatible systems was completed in 2004. 200 F-16C Block 40, 200 F-16D Block 40, 115 F-16C Block 42, and 100 F-16D Block 42 were built. All served with the United States Air Force, but were later exported after being replaced by their successors.

==== F-16C/D Block 50/52 ====
Originally deployed with the United States Air Force, they were upgraded and sent to Iraq as they became obsolete. The first Block 50 F-16 was delivered in late 1991; the aircraft is equipped with improved GPS/INS, and can carry an additional selection of advanced missiles on its 9 hardpoints: the AGM-88 HARM missile, JDAM, JSOW and WCMD. Block 50 aircraft are powered by the F110-GE-129 while the Block 52 jets use the F100-PW-229. Iraq was supplied 36 Block 50/52 jets, 24 single-seat and 12 twin-seat, that are also known by the designation F-16IQ.

==== F-16C/D Block 50/52 Plus ====
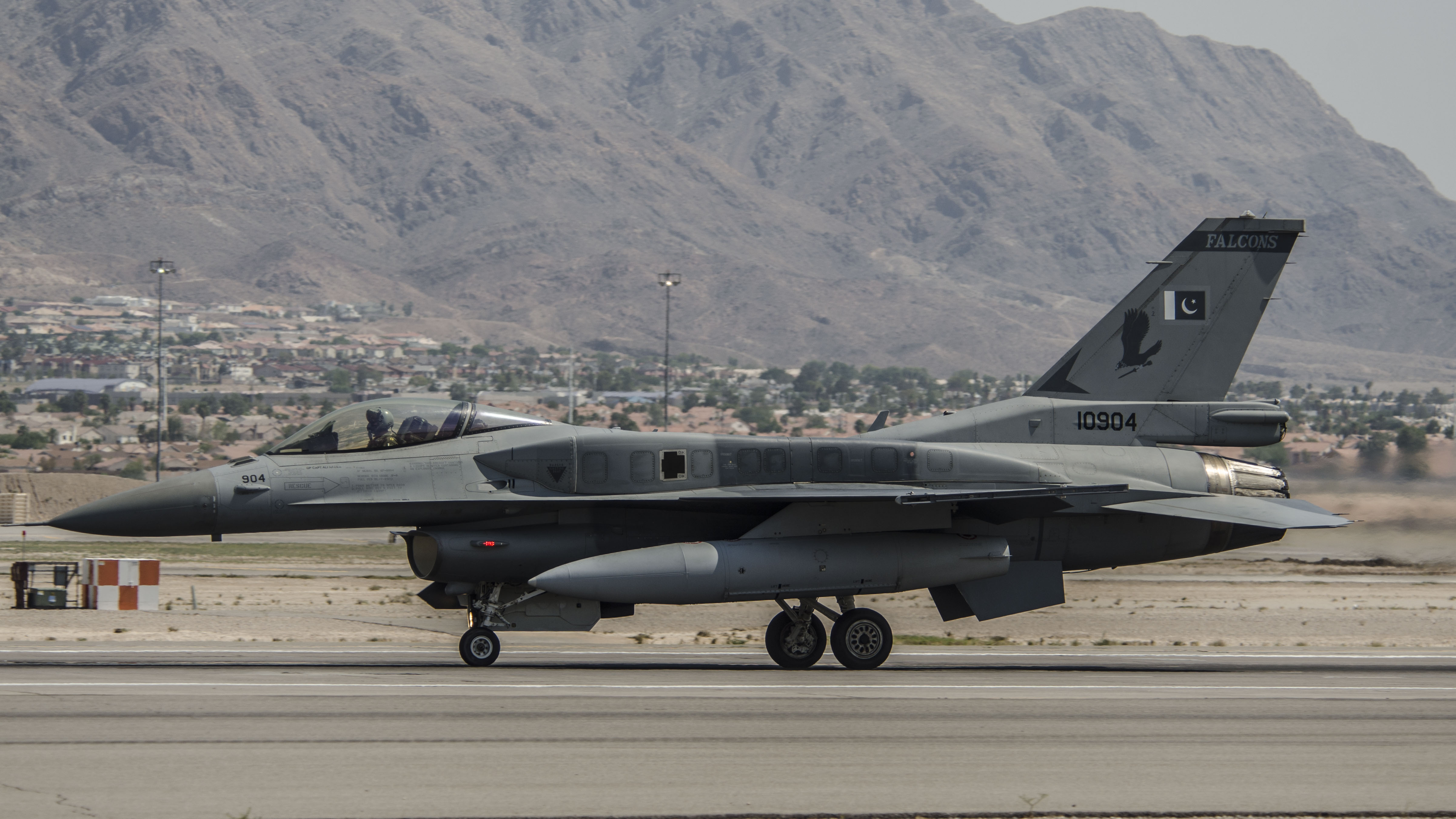
Pakistan Air Force F-16C Block 52+ of the No. 5 Squadron with Conformal fuel tanks.

This was an export model and never entered service with the US Air Force; all aircraft were shipped to various countries for delivery upon completion. This variant's main differences are the addition of support for conformal fuel tanks (CFTs), a dorsal spine compartment, the APG-68(V9) radar, an On-Board Oxygen Generation System (OBOGS), and a JHMCS helmet. Also, the engine difference is the same as the 50/52. Block 50 using F110-GE-129, while Block 52 uses F100-PW-229.

The CFTs are mounted above the wing, on both sides of the fuselage and are easily removable. They provide 440 US gallons (1,665 L) or approximately 3,000 pounds (1,400 kg) of additional fuel, allowing increased range or time on station and free up hardpoints for weapons instead of underwing fuel tanks. All two-seat "Plus" aircraft have the enlarged avionics dorsal spine compartment which is located behind the cockpit and extends to the tail. It adds 30 cu ft (850 L) to the airframe for more avionics with only small increases in weight and drag.

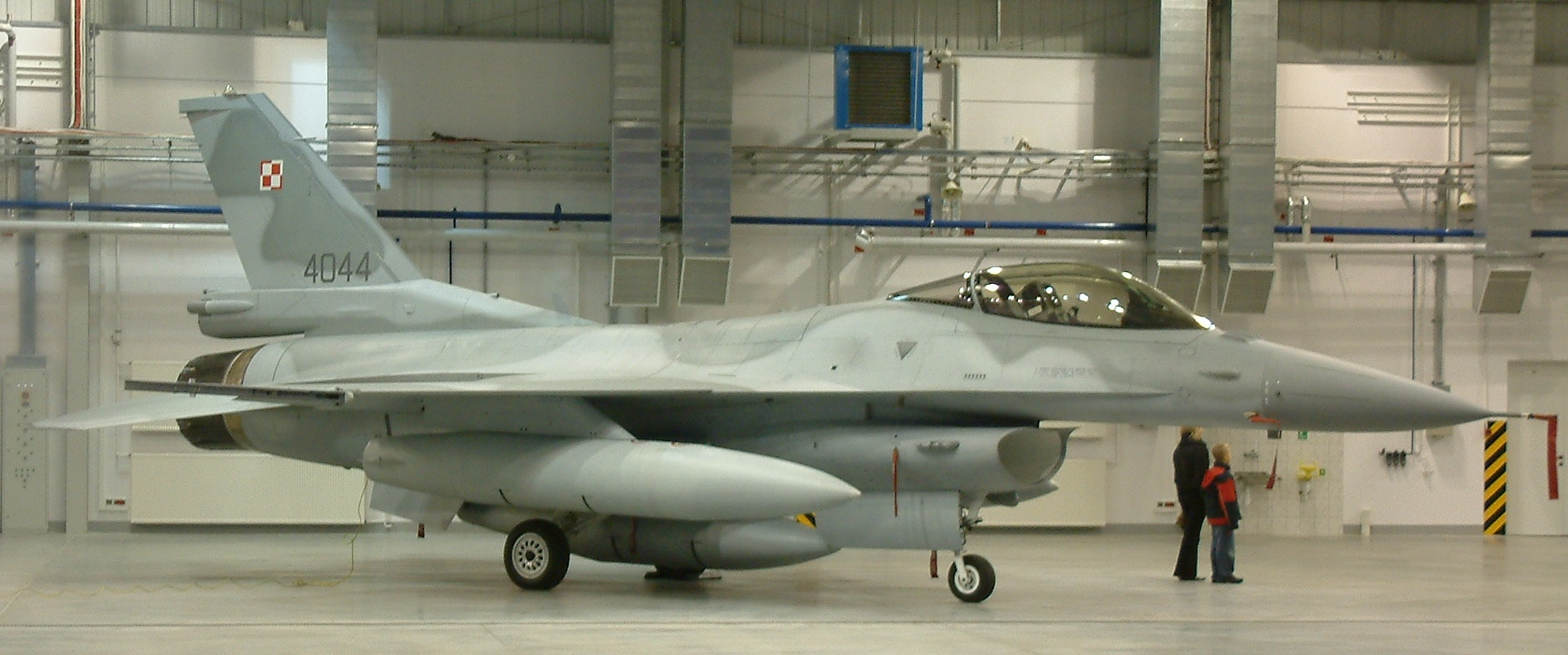
Polish Air Force F-16C Block 52+, 2006

Poland took delivery of its first F-16C Block 52+ aircraft on 15 September 2006. The "Poland Peace Sky program" includes 36 F-16Cs and 12 F-16Ds. All 48 aircraft were delivered in 2008. The Hellenic Air Force took delivery of its first F-16C Block 52+ aircraft on 2 May 2003. The Hellenic Air Force is the first Air Force in the world to operate this F-16 type. The total Greek order was 60 F-16C/D. The Israeli F-16I and its Singapore equivalent variant are based on the block 52+ aircraft. In March 2010, it was announced that the Egyptian Air Force would purchase 20 Block 52 aircraft (16 F-16Cs and 4 F-16Ds), the first of which arrived for testing in April 2012.

Under the PEACE ONYX III CCIP program, 165 of Turkish Air Force's F-16s have been upgraded to Block 50+ standards by Turkish Aerospace Industries.

The Pakistan Air Force bought 12 F-16C and 6 F-16D Block 52+ fighters.

=== F-16E/F ===
F-16E (single seat) and F-16F (two seat). Originally, the single-seat version of the General Dynamics F-16XL was to have been designated F-16E, with the twin-seat variant designated F-16F. This was sidelined by the Air Force's selection of the competing F-15E Strike Eagle in the Enhanced Tactical Fighter fly-off in 1984. The 'Block 60' designation had also previously been set aside in 1989 for the A-16, but this model was dropped. The F-16E/F designation now belongs to a version developed especially for the United Arab Emirates Air Force, and is sometimes unofficially called the "Desert Falcon".

==== F-16E/F Block 60 ====
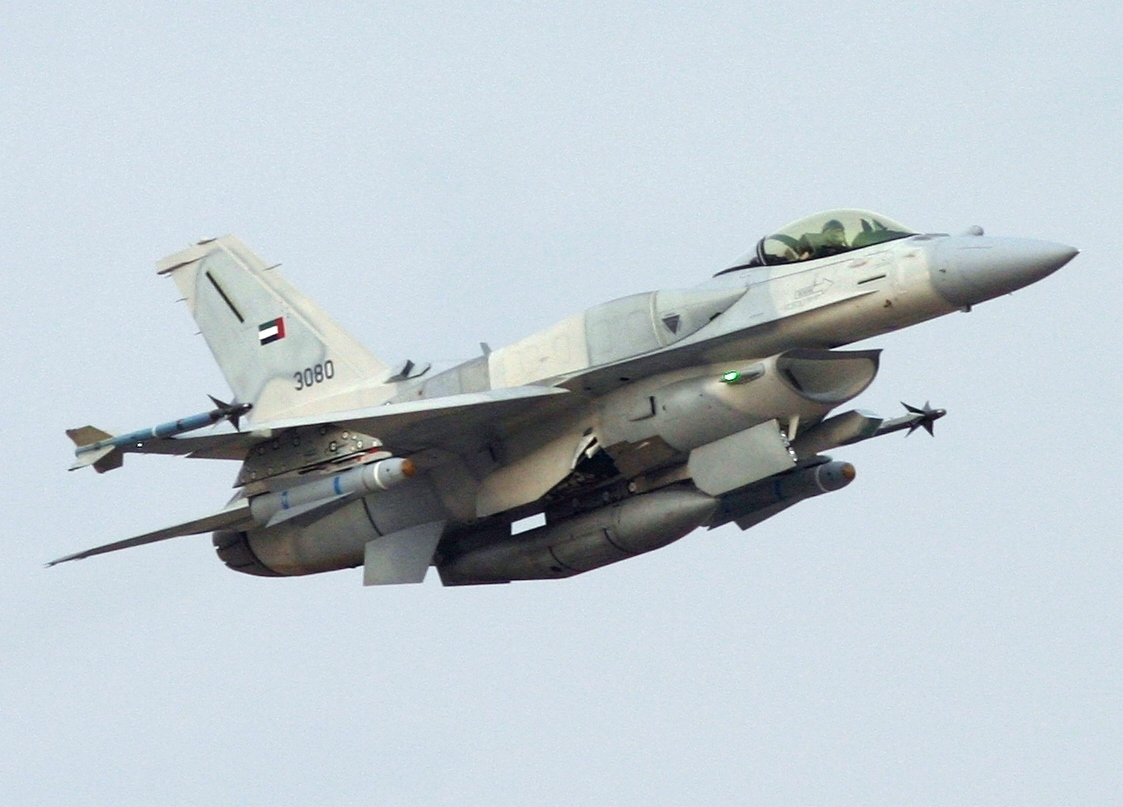
United Arab Emirates Air Force F-16 Block 60 taking off from the Lockheed Martin plant in Fort Worth, TX (NAS Fort Worth JRB).

The Block 60 was designed for the United Arab Emirates Air Force (UAEAF). Based on the F-16C/D Block 50/52+, it features improved radar, avionics and conformal fuel tanks. At one time, this version was incorrectly thought to have been designated "F-16U". A major difference from previous blocks is the Northrop Grumman AN/APG-80 Active electronically scanned array (AESA) radar, which gives the airplane the capability to simultaneously track and destroy ground and air threats. The Block 60's General Electric F110-GE-132 engine is a development of the −129 model and is rated at 32,500 lbf (144 kN). The Electronic Warfare system is supposed to be quite advanced and includes the Northrop Grumman Falcon Edge Integrated Electronic Warfare Suite RWR together with the AN/ALQ-165 Self-Protection Jammer. Falcon Edge, which was developed by Northrop Grumman specifically for the Block 60, is capable of showing not only the bearing of any threat but also the range.

The Block 60 allows the carriage of all Block 50/52-compatible weaponry as well as AIM-132 Advanced Short Range Air-to-Air Missile (ASRAAM) and the AGM-84E Standoff Land Attack Missile (SLAM). The conformal fuel tanks provide an additional 450 US gallon (2,045 L) of fuel, allowing increased range or time on station. This has the added benefit of freeing up hardpoints for weapons that otherwise would have been occupied by underwing fuel tanks. The Block 60 retains a MIL-STD-1553 data bus to support certain legacy systems, but also features a MIL-STD-1773 fiber-optic data bus which offers a 1,000 times increase in data-handling capability. UAE funded the entire $3 billion Block 60 development costs, and in exchange will receive royalties if any of the Block 60 aircraft are sold to other nations. According to press reports quoted by Flight International, this is "the first time the US has sold a better aircraft [F-16] overseas than its own forces fly". Like the F-35, the Block 60 F-16 has a built in FLIR/IRST/laser targeting system rather than using a dedicated pod that would occupy a hardpoint, increase drag and RCS.

In 2014 the UAE requested an upgrade to Block 61, along with the purchase of 30 more aircraft at that level. However, the UAE cancelled the order of buying and upgrading the F-16E/F Block 61.

=== F-16V Viper ===
On 15 February 2012, Lockheed Martin unveiled a new version of their F-16 at the 2012 Singapore Airshow. The F-16V will feature enhancements including an AN/APG-83 active electronically scanned array (AESA) radar, an upgraded mission computer and architecture, and improvements to the cockpit – all capabilities identified by the U.S. Air Force and several international customers for future improvements. The new variant is dubbed the "Viper", which is intended to better operate with fifth-generation fighters, and should not be confused with Lockheed's F-16IN Block 70/72 "Super Viper", which was offered to India for the Medium Multi-Role Combat Aircraft competition and showcased at the 2009 Aero India Air Show. "The new F-16V will become the new F-16 baseline," said George Standridge, Lockheed Martin Aeronautics' vice president of business development. On 16 October 2015, the F-16V flew for the first time with an APG-83 Scalable Agile Beam Radar AESA, a new Center Pedestal Display, a modernized mission computer, Automatic Ground Collision Avoidance System, and many other upgrades. This can be fitted on new production F-16s or retrofitted on existing ones. The first of these were for Republic of China Air Force (Taiwan) F-16A/B Block 20s. The upgrade of its 144 aircraft fleet started in January 2017 and was completed in February of 2024. In 2019, Taiwan and the United States signed an $8 billion deal that would deliver 66 new-build Block 70 aircraft.

==== F-16 Block 70/72 ====
Royal Bahraini Air Force

In September 2017, the U.S. Department of State approved a Foreign Military Sale to Bahrain for 19 new-build F-16V and upgrade its 20 existing F-16C/D Block 40 to F-16V standard.

In June 2018, Bahrain finalized its order for 16 new-build F-16V.

Hellenic Air Force

In October 2017, the U.S. approved the sale of 123 upgrade kits to Greece to bring their existing F-16C and D fighters up to the new F-16 Block 72 standard. On 28 April 2018, Greece decided to upgrade 84 aircraft.

Republic of Korea Air Force

South Korea also plans to upgrade 134 of its F-16C/D fleet to F-16V standard by November 2025.

Slovak Air Force

In April 2018, the U.s. Department of State approved a Foreign Military Sale to Slovakia for 14 new F-16Vs, pending approval from U.S. Congress. The Defence Ministry of Slovakia announced on 11 July 2018 that it intends to purchase 14 F-16 Block 70 aircraft from Lockheed Martin to replace its aging fleet of Mikoyan MiG-29s. The package, which includes armament and training, is worth €1.58 billion ($1.8 billion), and is Slovakia's largest military purchase in modern history. Defence Minister Peter Gajdoš signed the contract with Lockheed Martin representative Ana Wugofski in a press conference at the capital Bratislava on 12 December 2018. after the government approved the purchase.

The first completed jet was unveiled by the manufacturer on 7 September 2023, and first two aircraft were delivered to Slovakia on 22 July 2024.

Bulgarian Air Force

In December 2018, Bulgaria chose sixteen F-16 C/D Block 70/72 as replacements for MiG-29s. On 10 July 2019, Bulgaria approved the purchase of eight F-16 C/D Block 70/72 for $1.25 billion (~$1.51 billion in 2024). On 4 November 2022, the Bulgarian parliament approved the purchase of 8 more F-16 C/D Block 70/72 for $1.3 billion.

Republic of China Air Force (Taiwan)

On 27 February 2019, Taiwan requested to buy 66 new F-16 Block 70/72 airframes for an approximate $13 billion (~$15.7 billion in 2024) as replacement for their aging Mirage 2000 and F-5 fighters.

On 16 August 2019, the U.S. Department of State submitted the package to Congress, total package worth $8 billion (~$9.65 billion in 2024) for 66 F-16 Block 70 and other spare parts. On 13 December 2019, the US and Taiwan finalized the F-16V order. On 14 August 2020, Taiwan formally signed an agreement to buy 66 F-16V jets built by Lockheed Martin.

Royal Moroccan Air Force

On 25 March 2019, the U.S. Department of Defense announced approvals for two sets of foreign military sales of F-16V hardware to Morocco; one for upgrading its existing 23 F-16s to the F-16V configuration, valued at $985.2 million; and the second for a batch of 25 new Block 72 airframes, 29 new engines, a package of precision-guided munitions, and training valued at $3.787 billion.

Royal Jordanian Air Force

On 3 March 2020, It was announced that instead of upgrading, Royal Jordanian Air Force is now looking to buy the latest F-16 Block 70/72 model to replace its current fleet of older F-16s. As early as September 2017, the Royal Jordanian Air Force was working with the U.S. Air Force Air Force Life Cycle Management Center (AFLCMC), based at Wright Patterson Air Force Base, Ohio, to begin the Viper Block-70 operational upgrade program. This study is still under way, but it is unclear whether, and when, it will apply where necessary congressional approvals are needed to sell these possibilities to Jordan.

Turkish Air Force

On 30 September 2021, Turkey sent a formal request to the United States to purchase 40 new F-16 Block 70/72 aircraft and nearly 80 kits to modernize its F-16C/D fighters to F-16 Block 70/72 variant. Turkey later cancelled the upgrade kits from the deal and decided to modernize F-16s locally.

Other

In May 2021, the U.S. Air Force had awarded a $14 billion (~$15.9 billion in 2024) contract to Lockheed Martin to build new 128 Block 70/72 F-16 Fighting Falcon fighter jets on behalf of Bahrain, Slovakia, Bulgaria, Taiwan, Morocco and Jordan through 2026.

== Major modification variants ==
=== F-16A/B Block 15 ADF ===
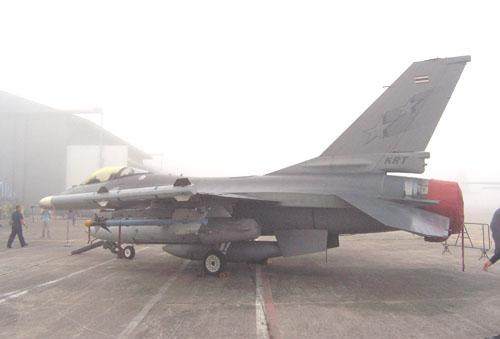
Royal Thai Air Force F-16ADF with AIM-120 AMRAAM

The F-16 Air Defense Fighter (ADF) was a special variant of the Block 15 optimized for the United States Air National Guard's fighter interception mission. Begun in 1989, 270 airframes were modified. Avionics were upgraded (including the addition of an Identification friend or foe (IFF) interrogator with "bird-slicing" IFF antennas), and a spotlight fitted forward and below the cockpit, for night-time identification. This was the only US version equipped with the AIM-7 Sparrow air-to-air missile. Beginning in 1994, these aircraft began to be replaced by newer F-16C variants. By 2005, only the 119th Fighter Group "Happy Hooligans", North Dakota Air National Guard, was flying this variant, with these last examples retired from the US service by 2007. (Note: 119th Wing)

=== F-16A/B Block 15 OCU ===
Beginning in January 1988, all Block 15 F-16A/B were delivered with an Operational Capability Upgrade (OCU). The Block 15 OCU aircraft incorporate the wide-angle HUD that was first introduced on the F-16C/D Block 25, more reliable F100-PW-220 turbofans, updated defensive systems, the ability to fire the AGM-65 Maverick air-to-ground missile, and the AGM-119 Penguin Mk.3 anti-shipping missile developed by the Norwegian company Kongsberg, and provisions for the AIM-120 AMRAAM. Many foreign customers, including Thailand, upgraded their aircraft to the F-16A/B Block 15OCU standard.

=== F-16AM/BM MLU ===
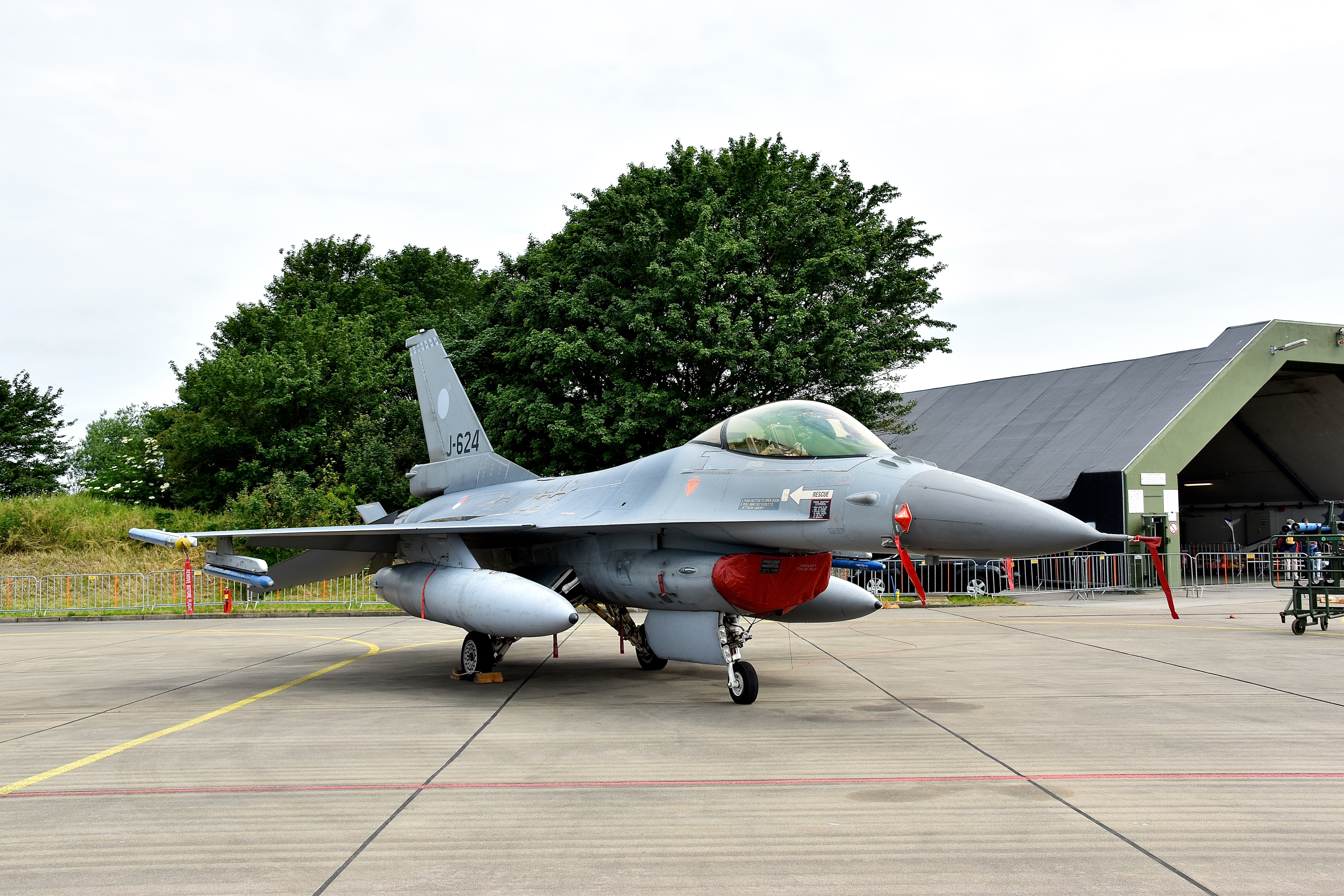
Dutch F-16AM with four MLU IFF antennas visible in front of the canopy

In 1989 a two-year study began regarding possible mid-life upgrades for the USAF's and European Partner Air Forces' (EPAF's) F-16A/Bs. The resulting F-16 Mid-Life Update (MLU) package was designed to upgrade the cockpit and avionics to the equivalent of that on the F-16C/D Block 50/52; add the ability to employ radar-guided air-to-air missiles; and to generally enhance the operational performance and improve the reliability, supportability and maintainability of the aircraft. Key upgrades include a modular mission computer with faster data processing, an advanced IFF system that allows "BVR weapons delivery in excess of radar limits," and an improved radar—the APG-66(V)2A—with increased range and the ability to track and engage more targets. Aircraft that received this set of upgrades were designated F-16AM or F-16BM (single-seat or dual-seat respectively). Some sources refer to the F-16 MLU as Block 20, but the Block 20 designation was specifically used for new-production jets with upgraded jets being referred to as MLU or, for example, Block 10 MLU.

Development began in May 1991 and continued until 1997; however, the USAF withdrew from the MLU program in 1992, although it did procure the modular mission computer for its Block 50/52 aircraft.

The first of five prototype conversions flew on 28 April 1995, and the first production kits were delivered in November 1996. The original plans called for the production of 553 kits (110 for Belgium, 63 for Denmark, 172 for the Netherlands, 57 for Norway, and 130 for the USAF). Final orders amounted to 325 kits (72 for Belgium, 61 for Denmark, 136 for the Netherlands, and 56 for Norway). The EPAFs re-designated the F-16A/B aircraft receiving the MLU as F-16AM/BM, respectively. Portugal later joined the program and the first of 20 aircraft was redelivered on 26 June 2003, with another 20 scheduled to go through the update in-country. In recent years, Chile, Jordan, and Pakistan have purchased surplus Dutch and Belgian F-16AM/BM for their air forces.

The development of new software and hardware modifications continues under the MLU program. The M3 software tape was installed in parallel with the Falcon STAR structural upgrade to bring the F-16AM/BM up to the standards of the USAF's Common Configuration Implementation Program (CCIP). A total of 296 M3 kits (72 for Belgium, 59 for Denmark, 57 for Norway, and 108 for the Netherlands) were ordered for delivery from 2002 to 2007; installation is anticipated to be completed in 2010. An M4 tape has also been developed that adds the ability to use additional weapons and the Pantera targeting pod; Norway began conducting flying combat operations in Afghanistan with these upgraded aircraft in 2008. An M5 tape enabled employment of a wider array of the latest smart weapons, and was first installed in 2009. In 2015 tape M7 was implemented.

Pakistan finished upgrading 41 F-16 Block 15s to Block 15 MLU in 2014 with help of Turkish Aerospace Industries, after signing a contract in 2009.

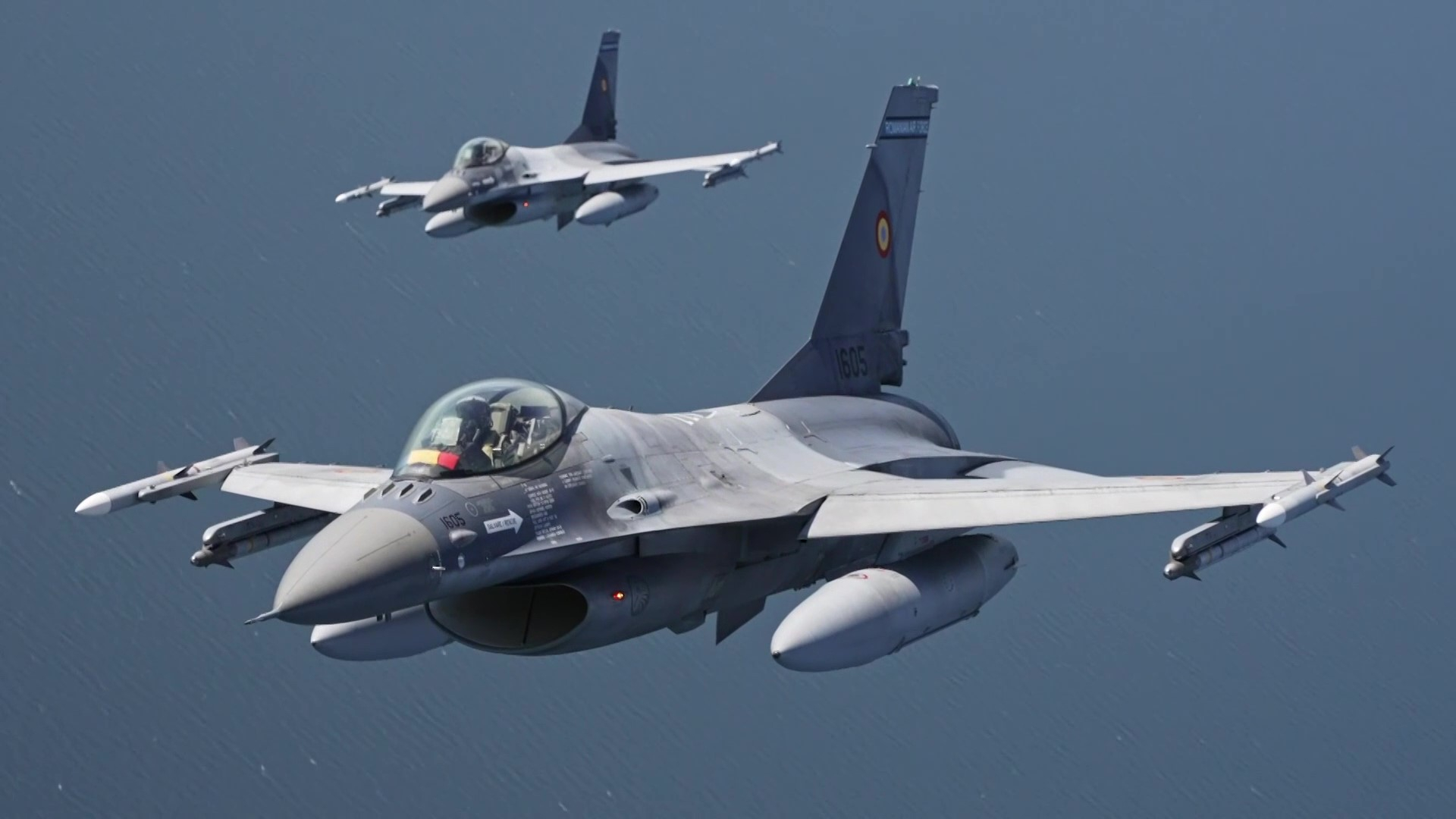
Romanian F-16AMs carrying the AIM-9X and AIM-120 missiles

Within the Peace Carpathian program, the F-16 aircraft purchased by the Romanian Air Force from Portugal were modernized to the MLU 5.2R standard starting c. 2016. This version includes many features that offer capabilities similar to the Block 50/52 variants. Among the key elements of the upgrade process are: the PW F100-PW-220E engine; standard F-16 C/D Block 50/52 cockpit, compatible with night vision systems; two multifunction displays; modular mission computer; modernized fire control radar; hybrid navigation system; advanced IFF system; electronic warfare management system and Link 16 data transmission system. In addition, the package also included the integration of other devices such as the Sniper Advanced Targeting Pod as well as the JHMCS helmet for the use with the AIM-120C-7 AMRAAM, AIM-9M and AIM-9X Sidewinder missiles.

Plans to further upgrade Romanian F-16s to the M.6.5.2 configuration were approved by the US in 2020.

=== F-16C/D Block 30 F-16N/TF-16N ===
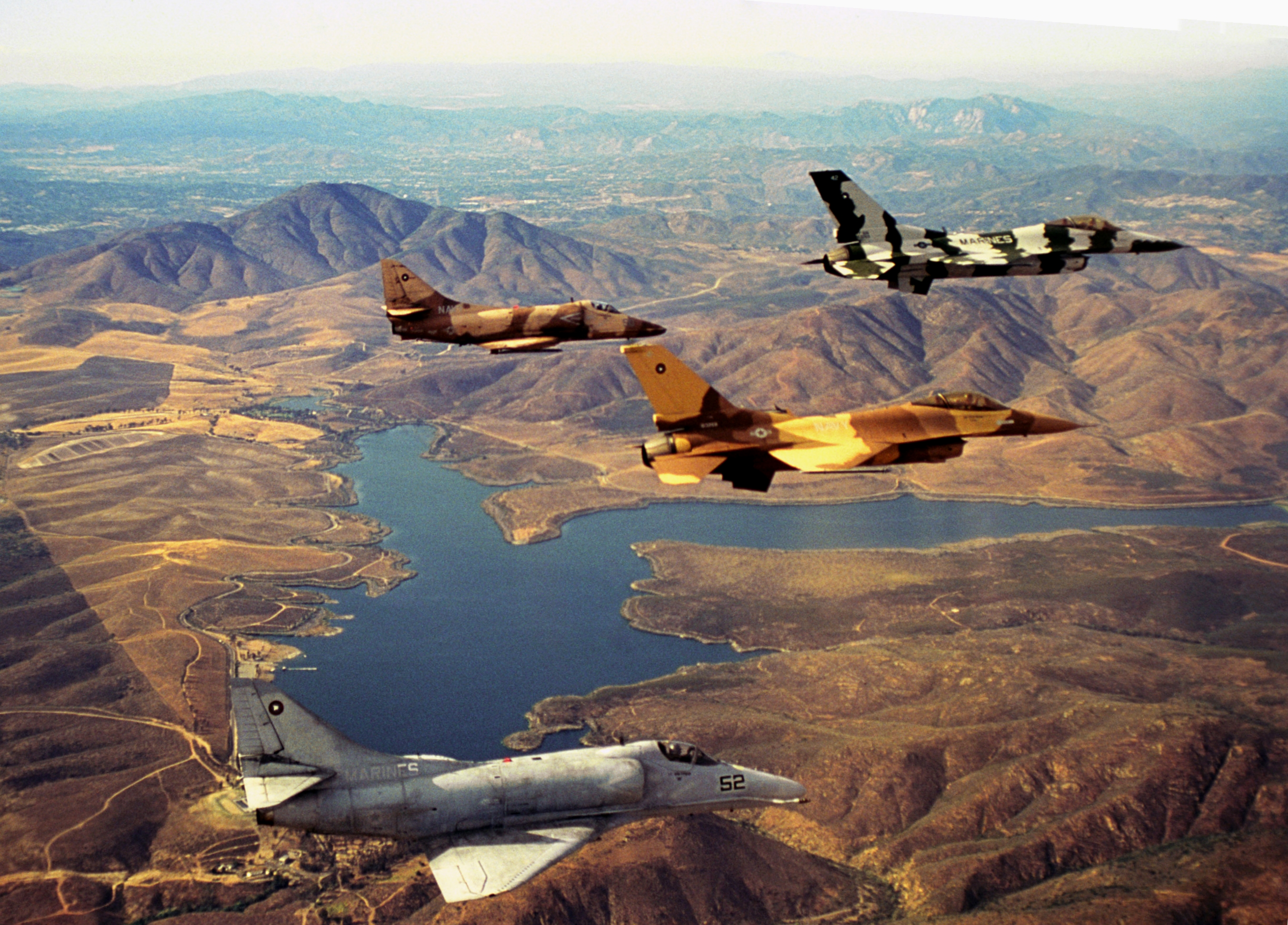
Top Gun F-16N and A-4F aircraft in formation

The U.S. Navy acquired 22 modified Block 30 F-16Cs for use as adversary assets for dissimilar air combat training (DACT); four of these were TF-16N two-seaters. These aircraft were delivered in 1987–1988. Fighter Squadron 126 (VF-126) and the Navy Fighter Weapons School (NFWS) (or "Top Gun") operated them at NAS Miramar, California, on the West Coast; East Coast adversary training squadrons were Fighter Squadron 43 (VF-43) at NAS Oceana, Virginia, and Fighter Squadron 45 (VF-45) at NAS Key West, Florida. Each squadron had five F-16N and one TF-16N, with the exception of Top Gun which had six and one, respectively. Due to the high stress of constant combat training, the wings of these aircraft began to crack and the Navy announced their retirement in 1994. By 1995, all but one of these aircraft had been sent to the 309th Aerospace Maintenance and Regeneration Group (AMARG) for preservation and storage; one F-16N was sent to the National Museum of Naval Aviation at NAS Pensacola, Florida, as a museum article. As adversary aircraft, the Navy's F-16Ns were notable for their colorful appearance. Most Navy F-16N aircraft were painted in a three-tone blue-gray "ghost" scheme. Top Gun had some of the more colorful ones: a three-color desert scheme, a light blue one and a green splinter camouflage version with Marine Corps markings. VF-126 also had a unique blue example.

In 2002, the Navy began to receive 14 F-16A and B models from the Aerospace Maintenance and Regeneration Center (AMARC) that were originally intended for Pakistan before being embargoed. These aircraft (which are not designated F-16N/TF-16N) are operated by the Naval Strike and Air Warfare Center (NSAWC) / Top Gun for adversary training and like their F-16N predecessors are painted in exotic schemes.

=== F-16CJ/DJ Block 50/52 ===
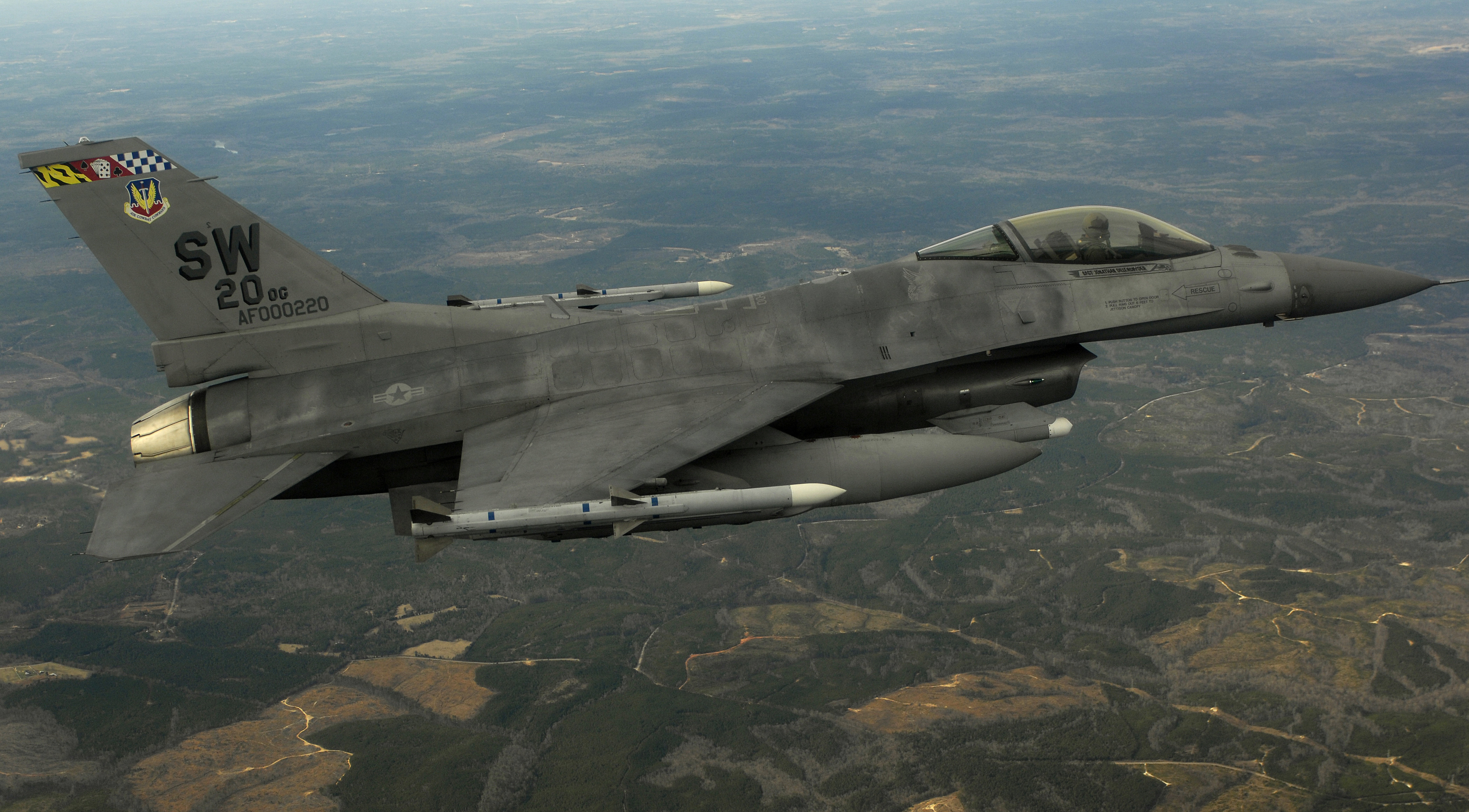
An F-16CJ of the 20th Fighter Wing

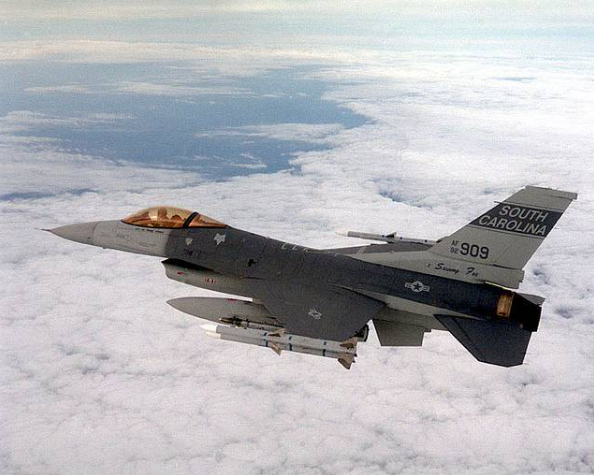
An F-16CJ of the 157th Fighter Squadron in Flight

An unknown number of Block 50/52 aircraft have been delivered to the USAF modified to perform the Suppression of Enemy Air Defenses (SEAD) mission, replacing the F-4G 'Wild Weasel' aircraft; these were unofficially designated F-16CJ/DJ. The first F-16CJ (serial number 91-0360) was delivered on 7 May 1993, with the first Block 52 F-16 ever in the entire Airforce being delivered to the 157th FS in February 1994 due to their new found reputation that was earned after their win in the 1989 Gunsmoke gunnery competition at Nellis AFB (which also earned them the first F-16s ever in service with the U.S. Air National Guard for the same reason). Capable of launching both the AGM-88 High-speed Anti-Radiation Missile (HARM) and AGM-45 Shrike anti-radiation missiles, the F-16CJ/DJ are equipped with a Lockheed Martin AN/AAS-35V Pave Penny laser spot tracker and the Texas Instruments AN/ASQ-213 HARM Targeting System (HTS), with the HTS pod mounted on the port intake hardpoint in place of the LANTIRN navigation pod. The first combat usage of these pods as well as the Litening II for the F-16 happened with the Block 52 F-16CJs of the 157th FS / South Carolina Air National Guard Squadron aka the "Swamp Foxes" during Operation Iraqi Freedom. They are one of the few Air National Guard squadrons to operate the HARM Targeting system equipped F-16CJs and employed these pods against Iraqi IADS (Integrated Air Defense Systems) hard killing the SAMs opposed to just suppressing them. They were the "first in" providing SEAD for the first strikes of the war including the famous F-117 Strike on Saddam Hussein. Another first for the F-16 came when the M3.1B software equipped F-16CJs of the 157th FS were the only F-16s in the theater which could independently fulfill the entire Air-to-Air ID matrix to satisfy the rules of engagement to shoot down enemy aircraft. The F-16CJ was also used to conduct air support by the same squadron during Operation Anaconda.

=== F-16C/D Block 52M ===
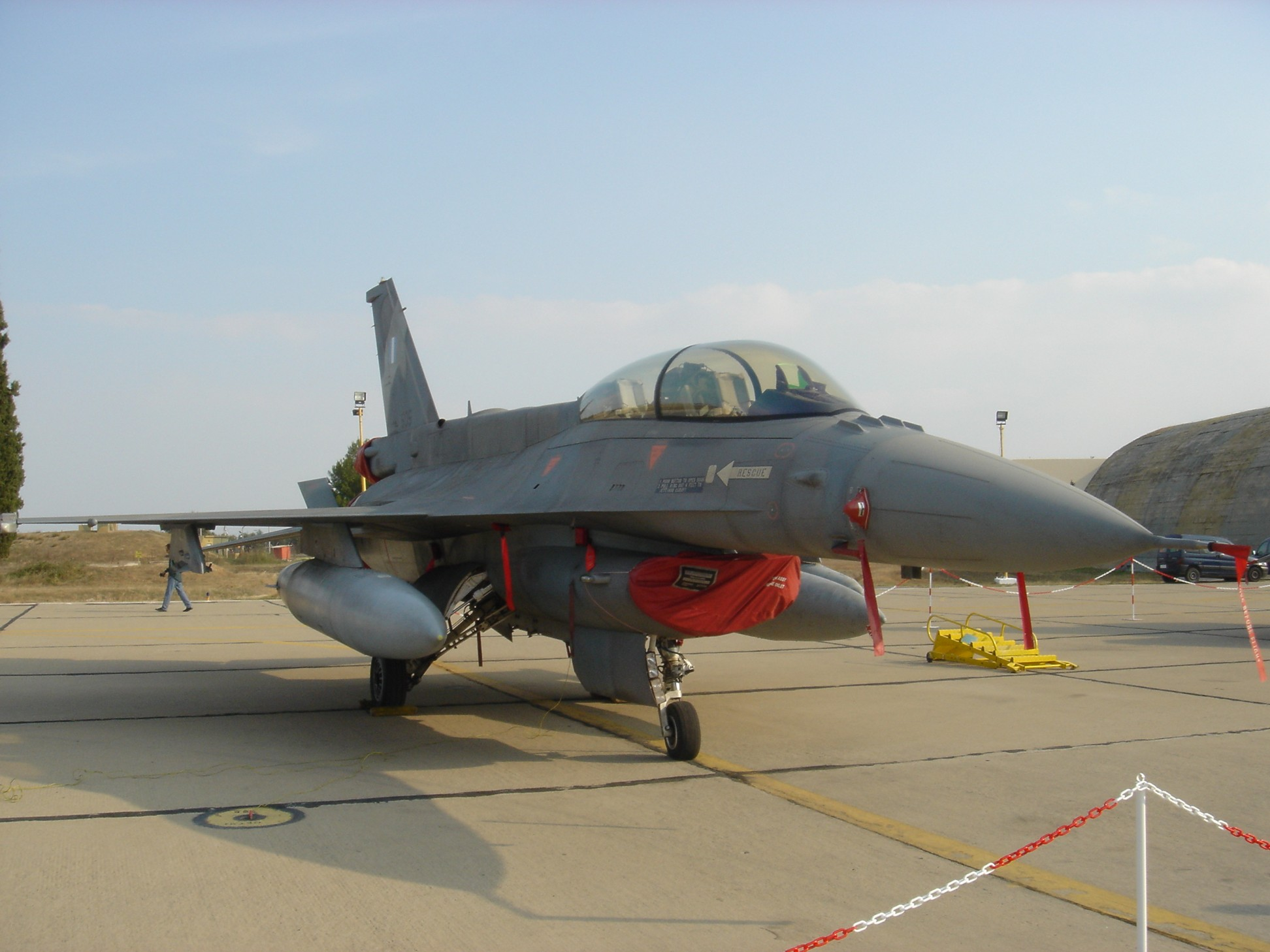
Hellenic Air Force F-16D Block 52+

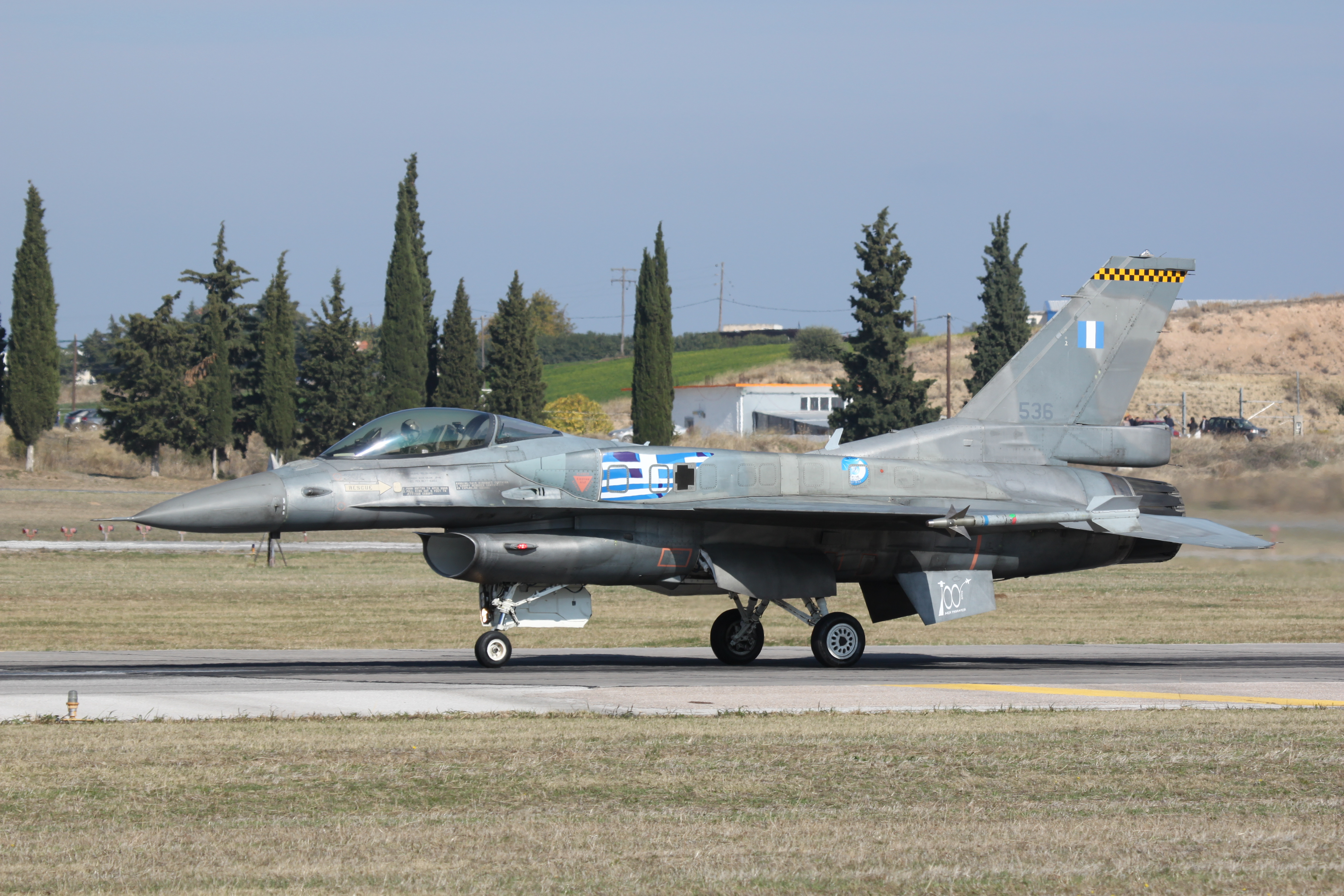
F-16C Block 52+ of 340th Squadron displaying as the Hellenic Air Force display team

In 2005, the Greek government ordered 30 more F-16C/D, 20 single-seat and 10 double-seat. These aircraft are called F-16C/D Block 52+ Advanced, but are known in the Hellenic Air Force as F-16 Block 52M (due to improved computing power for mission computer MMC). The differences between the normal Block 52+ and Block 52+ Advanced are that the Advanced version has a LINK 16 Communications System, more powerful Mission Control Computer, an extra Multi Function Display with a movable map navigation, advanced Debriefing System and the capability of carrying the RECCE Reconnaissance Pod. They also feature major upgrades by Lockheed Martin and Hellenic Aerospace Industry. The first aircraft were delivered to Hellenic Air Force in May 2009 and they are flying with the 335 Squadron "Tiger" in Araxos air base.

=== F-16I Sufa ===
The F-16I is a two-seat variant of the Block 52+ developed for the Israeli Defense Force – Air Force (IDF/AF). Israel issued a requirement in September 1997 and selected the F-16 in preference to the F-15I in July 1999. An initial "Peace Marble V" contract was signed on 14 January 2000 with a follow-on contract signed on 19 December 2001, for a total procurement of 102 aircraft. The F-16I, which is called Sufa (Storm) by the IDF/AF, first flew on 23 December 2003, and deliveries to the IDF/AF began on 19 February 2004. The F-16I has an estimated unit cost of approximately US$70 million (2006).

One major deviation of the F-16I from the Block 52+ is that approximately 50% of the avionics were replaced by Israeli-developed avionics, such as the Israeli Aerial Towed Decoy replacing the ALE-50 and autonomous aerial combat maneuvering instrumentation, which enables training exercises to be conducted without dependence on ground instrumentation. Elbit Systems produced the aircraft's helmet-mounted sight, head-up display (HUD), mission and presentation computers, and digital map display. Furthermore, the F-16I can employ Rafael's Python 5 infrared-guided air-to-air missile, and often uses Israel Aerospace Industries (IAI)'s removable conformal fuel tanks (CFT) for extended range. Key American-sourced systems include the F100-PW-229 turbofan engine, which offers commonality with the IDF/AF's F-15Is, and the APG-68(V)9 radar.

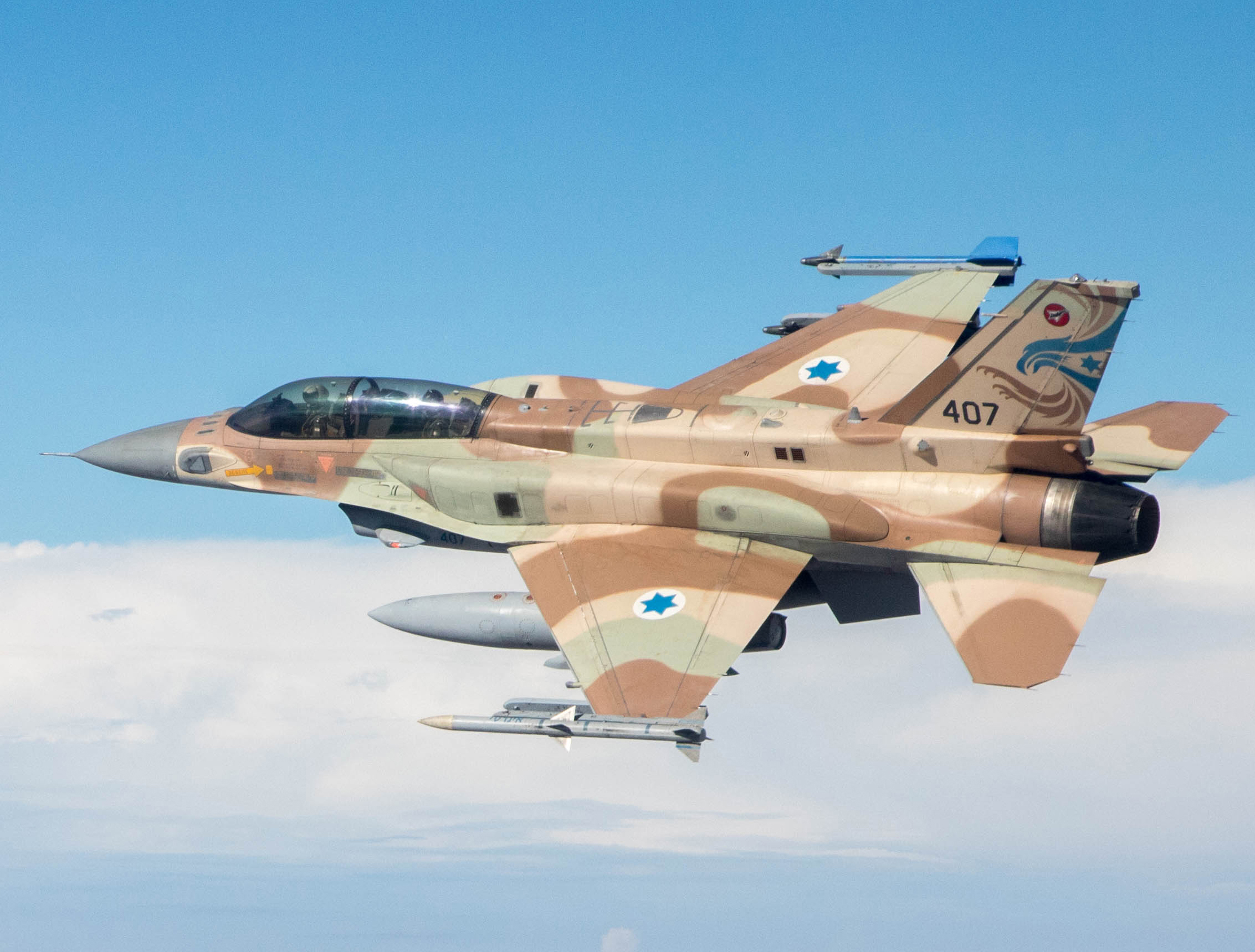
IAF F-16I Sufa in flight

== Special mission variants ==
=== A-16 ===
The A-16 began as a late-1980s GD project to develop a close air support (CAS) version of the basic F-16 by adding armor and strengthening the wings for a heavier weapons load, including a 30 mm cannon and 7.62 mm M134 Minigun gunpods. Two F-16A Block 15 aircraft were modified to this configuration. Envisioned as a successor to the A-10, the type was to have received the 'Block 60' designation; however, the A-16 never went into production due to a 26 November 1990 Congressional directive to the US Air Force mandating that it retain two wings of A-10s.

=== F/A-16 ===
A second outcome of that directive was a decision by the Air Force that, instead of upgrading the A-10, it would seek to retrofit 400 Block 30/32 F-16s as with new equipment to perform both CAS and battlefield air interdiction (BAI) missions. The new systems for this "F/A-16" Block 30 included a digital terrain-mapping system and Global Positioning System (GPS) integration for improved navigational and weapons delivery accuracy, as well as an Automatic Target Handoff System (ATHS) to allow direct digital target/mission data exchange between the pilot and ground units. This approach, however, was dropped in January 1992 in favor of equipping Block 40/42 F-16C/Ds with LANTIRN pods.

=== Other CAS initiatives ===
In 1991, 24 F-16A/B Block 10 aircraft belonging to the 174th TFW, a New York Air National Guard unit that had transitioned from the A-10 in 1988, were armed with the 30 mm GAU-13/A four-barrel derivative of the seven-barrel GAU-8/A cannon used by the A-10A. This weapon was carried in a General Electric GPU-5/A Pave Claw gun pod on the centerline station and was supplied with 353 rounds of ammunition. There were also plans to convert F-16Cs to this configuration and to incorporate the A-10s AN/AAS-35V Pave Penny laser spot tracker. The vibration from the gun when firing proved so severe as to make both aiming and flying the aircraft difficult and trials were suspended after two days. Although the 174th's aircraft were employed for CAS during Operation Desert Storm, they did not use the gun pods in action, and the Block 10 F/A-16 was phased out after the war.

=== F-16A(R) ===
About two dozen F-16As of the Royal Netherlands Air Force (RNLAF) were supplied with indigenous Oude Delft Orpheus low-altitude tactical reconnaissance pods transferred from its retiring RF-104G. Designated F-16A(R), the first example flew on 27 January 1983, and they entered service with the RNLAF's 306 Squadron in October 1984. The aircraft were common with the regular F-16s. However they were equipped with an extra panel in the cockpit to control the center line mounted pod. Under the MLU program, a more standardized interface was introduced so every aircraft could be used to operate the Orpheus pod or any other pod with the standardized interface.

Beginning in 1995, the Belgian Air Force replaced its own Mirage 5BR reconnaissance aircraft with at least a dozen F-16A(R) equipped with loaned Orpheus pods and Vinten cameras from the Mirages; these were replaced with more capable Per Udsen modular recce pods from 1996 to 1998. The F-16A(R) remained primarily combat aircraft with a secondary reconnaissance role.

=== F-16 Recce ===
The first reconnaissance variant was a USAF F-16D experimentally configured in 1986 with a centerline multi-sensor bathtub-style pod. The USAF decided in 1988 to replace the aging RF-4C Phantom fleet with F-16C Block 30s fitted with the Control Data Corporation's Advanced Tactical Airborne Reconnaissance System (ATARS) centerline pod, which could carry a variety of sensors. Problems with the ATARS program, however, led to the USAF's departure in June 1993. During the mid-1990s, the U.S. Air Force experimented with a series of centerline recce pod designs, beginning with a prototype pod, the Electro-Optical 1 (EO-1) pod. This was followed by four "Richmond recce pods", which saw service in the Balkans. The USAF finally settled on what would become the definitive AN/ASD-11 Theater Airborne Reconnaissance System (TARS). The first F-16 flight with a prototype TARS flew on 26 August 1995, and on 27 September 1996 the USAF placed its first production order for the pods. Block 30s and Block 25s of five Air National Guard (ANG) squadrons have received the system since mid-1998. The USAF, however, does not designate them "RF-16s".

=== RF-16A/C ===
The designation RF-16A is used by the Royal Danish Air Force. In early 1994, 10 Danish F-16A were redesignated as RF-16A tactical recce aircraft, replacing the RF-35 Drakens withdrawn at the end of 1993. As a temporary measure they were originally fitted with the Drakens' optical cameras and electro-optical (E-O) sensors repackaged in a Per Udsen 'Red Baron' recce pod, which were replaced a few years later by Per Udsen's Modular Reconnaissance Pod (MRP).

== Major upgrade programs ==
=== F-16 MSIP ===
In 1980, General Dynamics, the USAF's F-16 System Program Office (SPO), and the EPG partners initiated a long-term Multinational Staged Improvement Program (MSIP) to evolve new capabilities for the F-16, mitigate risks during technology development, and ensure its currency against a changing threat environment. The F-16 Falcon Century program, a survey and evaluation of new technologies and new capabilities that began in 1982, was also relied upon to identify new concepts for integration onto the F-16 through the MSIP derivative development effort. Altogether, the MSIP process permitted quicker introduction of new capabilities, at lower costs, and with reduced risks compared to traditional stand-alone system enhancement and modernization programs.

The first stage, MSIP I, began in February 1980 and it introduced the new technologies that defined the Block 15 aircraft. Fundamentally, MSIP I improvements were focused on reducing the cost of retrofitting future systems. These included structural and wiring provisions for a wide-field-of-view raster HUD; multi-function displays (MFD); advanced fire control computer and central weapons interface unit; integrated Communications/Navigation/Identification (CNI) system; beyond-visual-range (BVR) air-to-air missiles, electro-optical and target acquisition pods, and internal electronic countermeasures (ECM) systems; and increased-capacity environmental control and electrical power systems. Delivery of the first USAF MSIP I Block 15 aircraft occurred in November 1981, and work on the first EPG MSIP I aircraft began in May 1982.

MSIP II began in May 1981, leading to the F-16C/D Block 25/30/32. Block 25 added systems which the MSIP I provisions had enabled. The first MSIP II F-16C Block 25 was delivered in July 1984. Block 30/32 takes advantage of the Alternative Fighter Engine program that offered a choice between two engines for the F-16: the General Electric F110-GE-100 (Block 30) as well as the newly upgraded Pratt & Whitney F100-PW-220 (Block 32). To take full advantage of the higher-thrust GE engine, a larger, modular air inlet duct was fitted on Block 30s. MSIP II capabilities introduced on the Block 30/32 also included the ability to target multiple aircraft with the AMRAAM; range, resolution, and signal processor improvements to the AN/APG-68 radar; a ring laser gyroscope; ALQ-213 electronic warfare system; added cooling air capacity for the more powerful avionics suite; and employment of the AGM-45 Shrike anti-radiation missiles. The first Block 30 was delivered in July 1986.

MSIP III produced the Block 40/42/50/52. Initiated in June 1985, the first MSIP III Block 40 was delivered in December 1988, and the first Block 50 followed in October 1991. Introduced in the MSIP III Block 40/42 were LANTIRN navigation and targeting pods, along with the related diffractive optics HUD; the increased-reliability APG-68V fire-control radar; an aft-seat HUD monitor in the F-16D; a four-channel digital flight-control system; GPS; advanced EW and Identification Friend or Foe (IFF) equipment; and further structural strengthening to counter the aircraft's growing weight. The Block 50/52 received uprated F100-GE-129 and F110-PW-229 engines; an upgraded programmable display generator with digital terrain mapping; an improved APG-68V5 fire-control radar; an automatic target hand-off system; an anti-jam radio; the ALE-47 chaff dispenser; and integration of AGM-88 HARM anti-radiation missiles.

Although only three stages had been originally planned, GD proposed an MSIP IV segment (marketed as 'Agile Falcon'), but this was rejected by the Air Force in 1989. However, most of its elements – such as extensive avionics upgrades, color displays, an electronic warfare management system (EWMS), reconnaissance pods, AIM-9X Sidewinder infrared air-to-air missile integration, and helmet-mounted sights – have been introduced since that time.

=== Pacer Loft I and II ===
F-16A/B Blocks 1 and 5 were upgraded to the Block 10 standard under a two-phase program: Pacer Loft I (1982–1983) and Pacer Loft II (1983–1984).

=== Falcon UP ===
Although the F-16 was originally designed with an expected service life of 8,000 flying hours, actual operational usage has proven to be more severe than expected and this has been exacerbated by its growing weight as more systems and structure have been added to the aircraft. As a result, the anticipated average service life of the F-16A/B had fallen to only 5,500 flying hours. Beginning in the early 1990s, the Falcon UP program restored the 8,000-hour capability for the USAF's Block 40/42 aircraft. Pleased with the results, the USAF extended the Falcon UP effort to provide a Service Life Improvement Program (SLIP) for its Block 25 and 30/32 aircraft to ensure 6000 flying hours, and a Service Life Extension Program (SLEP) for its F-16A/B aircraft to assure their achieving 8,000 hours.

=== Falcon STAR ===
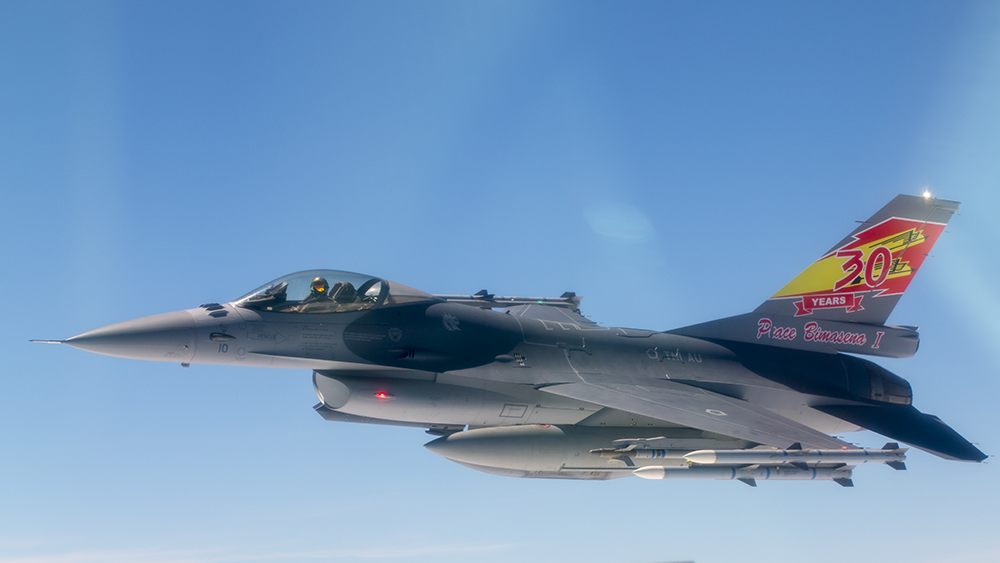
Indonesian Air Force F-16AM, formerly F-16A Block 15 OCU after undergoing Falcon STAR eMLU upgrade

Falcon STAR (Structural Augmentation Roadmap) is a program to repair and replace critical airframe components on all F-16A/B/C/D aircraft; like Falcon UP, it is intended to ensure an 8000-hour service life, but it is based on more recent operational usage statistics. The first redelivery occurred in February 2004, and in 2007 the USAF announced that it would upgrade 651 Block 40/42/50/52 F-16s; this is expected to extend the Falcon STAR program, which began in 1999, through 2014.

=== F-16 ACE ===
Israel Aircraft Industries developed an open-architecture avionics suite upgrade for its F-16s known as the Avionics Capabilities Enhancement (ACE). It introduced the first "full-glass cockpit" on an operational F-16, and featured an advanced fire-control radar, an Up Front Control Panel (UFCP), and an option for a wide-angle HUD or a helmet-mounted display. The first flight of an F-16B equipped with ACE was accomplished in May 2001. The ACE upgrade was not taken up by the Israeli Air Force, which ordered a second batch of the F-16I instead; IAI offered ACE to Venezuela, but the U.S. government blocked it and stated that it would only permit elements of ACE, not the whole suite, to be exported.

=== F-16 Falcon ONE ===
Singapore Technologies Aerospace (ST Aero) has also developed a state-of-the-art, "glass cockpit" avionics suite as an alternative to the MLU offering. The Falcon ONE suite includes a wide-angle HUD that can display FLIR imagery, the Striker Helmet-Mounted Display (HMD), a datalink capability, and the FIAR Grifo radar. First revealed at the Farnborough Air Show on 25 July 2000, it has yet to find a customer.

=== F-16 CCIP ===
The Common Configuration Implementation Program (CCIP) was a $2 billion modernization effort that sought to standardize all USAF Block 40/42/50/52 F-16s to a common Block 50/52-based avionics software and hardware configuration for simplified training and maintenance. Lockheed Martin received a contract to develop the first phase CCIP configuration upgrade packages in June 1998; kit production work started in 2000, and deliveries began in July 2001. In 2007, Korean Air was awarded a USAF contract for F-16 upgrades, which included both CCIP, Falcon-STAR, and Drop in Maintenance works. 100 USAF F-16s were to be upgraded and maintained by Korean Air under the contract. The upgrade program would extend the F-16's flying hours from 6,000 to 8,000 hours. The work would continue for six years until 2013.

Phase 1 of the CCIP added new Modular Mission Computers, color cockpit display kits and advanced IFF systems to domestically based Block 50/52 aircraft, and introduced the new Sniper Advanced Targeting Pod (ATP). The ability of the F-16CJ/DJ to employ GPS-guided weapons was extended to the rest of the Block 50/52 fleet. Upgraded Phase 1 aircraft redeliveries began in January 2002. The second phase extended these upgrades to overseas-based Block 50/52 Falcons, and redeliveries ran from July 2003 to June 2007. Phase II also included the introduction of autonomous beyond-visual-range air-intercept capability, the Link-16 datalink, and the Joint Helmet-Mounted Cueing System (JHMCS).

The ongoing Phase 3 effort is focused on Block 40/42 F-16s. Development began in July 2003 and by June 2007 Lockheed Martin had completed roughly a quarter of the USAF's Block 40/42 fleet. Phase 3 incorporates the M3+ Operational Flight Program (OFP) which extends the capabilities of the first two phases to the Block 40/42 fleet and adds Multifunctional Information Distribution System (MIDS), the new NATO-standard datalink network. Development of an M4+ OFP began in late 2002; this update will allow use of the Raytheon AIM-9X on Block 40/42/50/52 aircraft. Northrop Grumman was awarded a contract in early 2004 to develop an M5+ upgrade kit to update the AN/APG-68(V)5 radars on the Block 40/42/50/52 Falcons to the AN/APG-68(V)9 standard; upgrading of Block 40/42 aircraft began in 2007 and is to become operational on the Block 50/52 aircraft by 2010. An M6+ OFP is under consideration, and could include integration of the GBU-39 Small Diameter Bomb (SDB) on CCIP aircraft, which is planned to begin in fiscal year 2012.

Turkey became the first international customer for the CCIP update with the signing of a $1.1 billion contract on 26 April 2005 to upgrade an initial 80 Block 40/50 and 37 Block 30 F-16C/Ds to an equivalent of the Phase 3/M5+ OFP standard under the "Peace Onyx III" Foreign Military Sales (FMS) program. This work will be performed by Turkish Aerospace Industries (TAI) and Turkey holds the option to upgrade the remainder of its 100 Block 40s, which could extend the program.

=== CUPID ===
The Combat Upgrade Plan Integration Details (CUPID) effort is an ongoing initiative to bring older U.S. Air National Guard and Air Force Reserve Command Block 25/30/32 F-16s closer to Block 50/52 specifications. CUPID focuses on adding improved precision attack capabilities, night vision equipment, datalinks, carriage of the Litening II infrared targeting pod, and laser- and GPS-guided weapons.

=== F-16C/D Barak 2020 ===
In 2011 Israeli Air force announced an upgrade program of its aging F-16C/D (blocks 30 and 40) fleet, to make it valuable in 2020 and even later. The upgrade included installation of new avionics and new wiring, which brought these block 30/40 airframes closer to the IAF's I (Sufa) model (itself an upgrade of the Block 52+ F-16D). The program was completed in 2014.

=== F-16C/D Özgür/Özgür II ===
In 2012, the Turkish Air Force announced the modernization of 35 of its F-16 Block 30 aircraft. Replacements within the scope of the modernization include: a Turkish mission computer, secure voice radio module, and IFF system; and upgrades to various other instrumentation and avionics systems. In 2023, it was announced that the upgrade will be applied to other F-16 aircraft starting with the Block 40 variants in the Turkish Air Force. The said aircraft will be dubbed as 'F-16C/D Block 30TM'.

Another important project carried out with ÖZGÜR is the domestic MURAD AESA Radar developed by Aselsan. The radar will first be installed on Baykar's AKINCI UCAV before being tested and integrated on the F-16. Within the scope of ÖZGÜR II program, modernization will be applied to F-16 Block 40/50 with an additional upgrade to Block 30s which will include obtaining External Load Certification for various ammunition types, miniature bombs, and the ASELPOD targeting pod. The project also aims to incorporate communications and radio equipment and facilitate the integration of Bozdoğan and HGK-82 munitions into the Block 30s.

=== F-16 C/D Post Block Integration Team (PoBIT) ===
In 2022, the United States Air Force announced the modernization of 608 of its F-16 Block 40 and F-16 Block 50 to F-16 Block 70 (F-16V) standard. Upgrades for the PoBIT program include the installation of the AN/APG-83 Scalable Agile Beam Radar (SABR), the Center Display Unit (CDU), a programmable data generator, new-generation electronic warfare capabilities, a communications suite upgrade, and a modernized mission computer.

== Technology demonstrators, and test variants ==
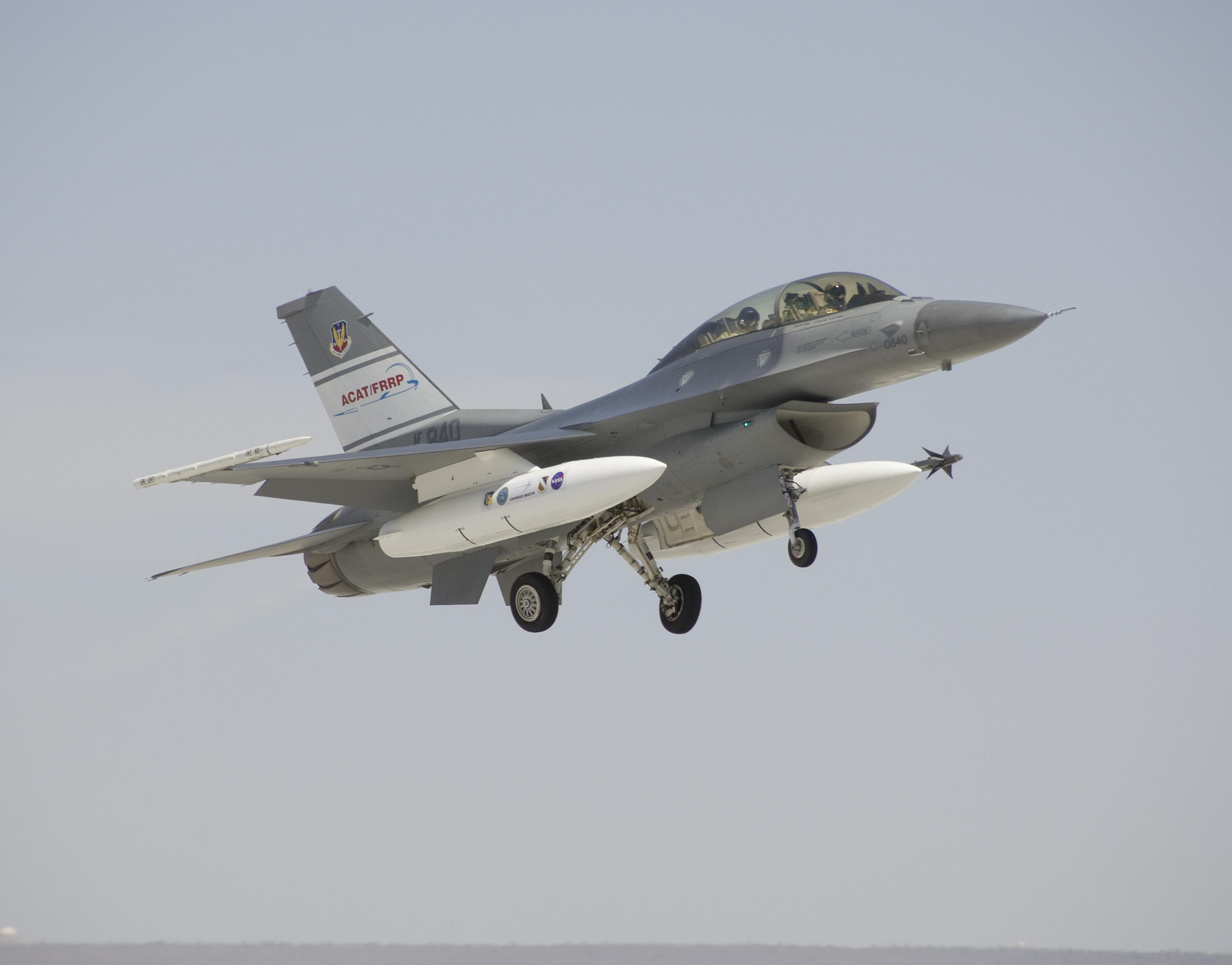
The U.S. Air Force's F-16D Automatic Collision avoidance Technology (ACAT) aircraft

=== Flight control variants ===
==== YF-16 CCV ====
The initial YF-16 prototype was reconfigured in December 1975 to serve as the USAF Flight Dynamics Laboratory's Control-Configured Vehicle (CCV) testbed. The CCV concept entails "decoupling" the aircraft's flight control surfaces so that they can operate independently. This approach enables unusual maneuvers such as being able to turn the airplane without banking it. The ability to maneuver in one plane without simultaneously moving in another was seen as offering novel tactical performance capabilities for a fighter. The CCV YF-16 design featured twin pivoting ventral fins mounted vertically underneath the air intake, and its triply redundant fly-by-wire (FBW) flight control system (FCS) was modified to permit use of flaperons on the wings' trailing edges which would act in combination with an all-moving stabilator. The fuel system was redesigned to enable adjustment of the aircraft's center of gravity by transferring fuel from one tank to another. The CCV aircraft achieved its first flight on 16 March 1976. The flight test program ran until 30 June 1977, and was marred only by a hard landing on 24 June 1976 that delayed testing until repairs were effected. The CCV program was judged successful and led to a more ambitious follow-on effort in the form of the "Advanced Fighter Technology Integration" (AFTI) F-16. The first effort accomplished under the AFTI program was a paper study with three separate contractors (i.e., McDonnell Douglas, Fairchild Republic, Rockwell International) to design an advanced aircraft technology demonstrator using new concepts such as direct lift control, direct side force control and drag modulation.

==== F-16 SFW ====
General Dynamics was one of several U.S. aircraft makers awarded a contract by the Defense Advanced Research Projects Agency (DARPA) in 1976 to develop proposals for an experimental forward-swept wing test aircraft. GD's entry, the Swept Forward Wing (SFW) F-16, had a slightly lengthened fuselage to accommodate the larger, advanced composites wing. In January 1981, DARPA selected Grumman's entry, which became known as the X-29A. Although the SFW F-16 was not chosen, the X-29 incorporated some of the F-16's features, particularly its FBW flight control system and its undercarriage.

==== F-16XL ====
The F-16XL featured a novel 'cranked-arrow' type of delta wing with more than twice the area of the standard F-16 wing. Developed under a program originally known as the Supersonic Cruise and Maneuvering Program (SCAMP), the design was intended to offer low drag at high subsonic or supersonic speeds without compromising low-speed maneuverability. As a result, the F-16XL was able to cruise efficiently at supersonic speeds without using afterburner, commonly known as supercruise. In late 1980, the USAF agreed to provide GD with the third and fifth FSD F-16s for modification into single-seat and twin-seat F-16XL prototypes. To accommodate the larger wing, the aircraft was lengthened 56 in (142 cm) by the addition of a 30-inch (76 cm) plug in the forward fuselage and a 26-inch (66 cm) section to the aft fuselage just behind the landing gear bulkhead. The rear fuselage was also canted up by three degrees to increase the angle of attack on takeoff and landing. The F-16XL could carry twice the payload of the F-16 on 27 hardpoints, and it had a 40% greater range due to an 82% increase in internal fuel carriage. The single-seat F-16XL first flew on 3 July 1982, followed by the two-seater on 29 October 1982. The F-16XL competed unsuccessfully with the F-15E Strike Eagle in the Enhanced Tactical Fighter (ETF) program; if it had won the competition, the production versions were to have been designated F-16E/F. Following the February 1984 selection announcement, both examples of the F-16XL were placed in flyable storage.

In late 1988, the two prototypes were taken out of storage and turned over to the National Aeronautics and Space Administration (NASA) for use in a program designed to evaluate aerodynamic concepts for improving laminar airflow over the wing during sustained supersonic flight. From 1989 to 1999, both aircraft were used by NASA for several experimental research programs, and in 2007, NASA was considering returning the single-seat F-16XL to operational status for further aeronautical research. The F-16 XL had much better lift and maneuverability than the normal F-16 A/B Block15.

==== Falcon 21++ ====
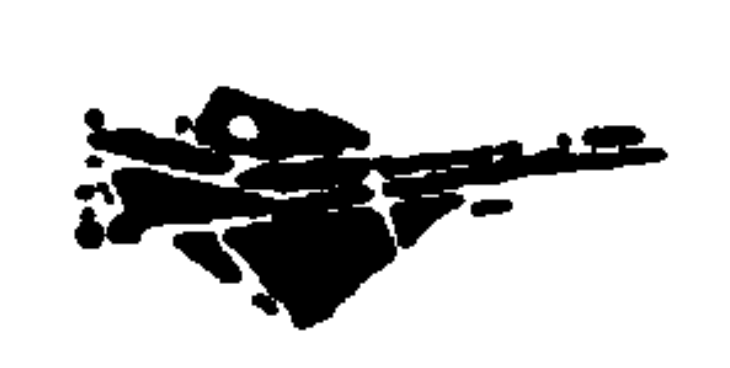
A blurry, poor resolution image of the Falcon 21++

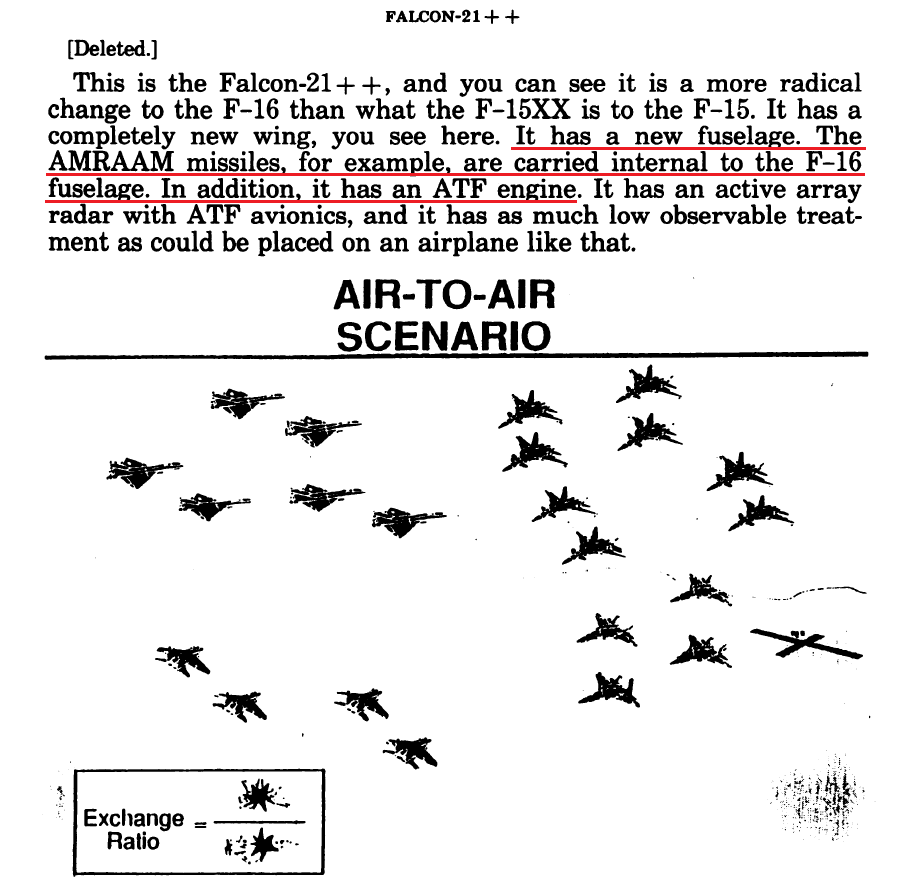
Falcon 21++

At a Senate executive session 'Air Force Acquisition Plans and Modernization Requirements' held on 22 April 1991, Major General Joseph W. Ralston, USAF Director of Tactical Programs, testified that the Falcon 21++ was supposed to have a new fuselage carrying AIM-120 AMRAAMs inside the fuselage. The Falcon 21++ was studied in 1990 as a cheaper alternative to the Advanced Tactical Fighter that became the F-22 Raptor. A blurry image of poor resolution shows the Falcon 21++ had a delta wing and twin vertical tails. The Falcon 21++ was also supposed to be powered by an ATF engine (P&W F119) and an AESA radar with ATF avionics, plus "as much observable treatment as could be placed on an airplane like that", according to Major General Ralston.

==== F-16X Falcon 2000 ====
In 1993 Lockheed proposed development of a new version of the F-16. This F-16X "Falcon 2000" featured a delta wing based on that of the F-22, together with a fuselage stretch to accommodate the new wing. The F-16X would have 80% more internal fuel volume. The design also permitted conformal carriage of the AIM-120 AMRAAM. Lockheed claimed the F-16X could be built for two-thirds the cost of the F/A-18E/F Super Hornet.

==== NF-16D/VISTA/MATV ====
In the late 1980s, General Dynamics and General Electric began exploring the application of thrust vector control (TVC) technology to the F-16 under the F-16 Multi-Axis Thrust-Vectoring (MATV) program. Originally the Israel Defense Forces/Air Force was going to supply an F-16D for this effort; however, the USAF, which had initially declined to support the program, changed its mind and took over the MATV project in 1991 and Israel withdrew from it the following year (the IDF was involved later when Ilan Ramon, who later became an astronaut on the ill-fated STS-107, flew the MATV F-16 during flight testing at Edwards AFB.)

Meanwhile, General Dynamics had received a contract in 1988 to develop the Variable-stability In-flight Simulator Test Aircraft (VISTA). The F-16 VISTA effort was funded by the USAF, the U.S. Navy, and NASA. Calspan, a subcontractor to GD, fitted a Block 30 F-16D belonging to Wright Labs with a center stick (in addition to the sidestick controller), a new computer, and a digital flight control system that allowed it to imitate, to a degree, the performance of other aircraft. Redesignated NF-16D, its first flight in the VISTA configuration occurred on 9 April 1992.

In 1993, the variable-stability computers and center stick were temporarily removed from the VISTA for flight tests for the MATV program, under which the first use of thrust-vectoring in flight was accomplished on 30 July. Thrust-vectoring was enabled through the use of the Axisymmetric Vectoring Exhaust Nozzle (AVEN). Following the conclusion of MATV testing in March 1994, the VISTA variable-stability computers were reinstalled. In 1996 a program was begun to fit the NF-16D with a multi-directional thrust-vectoring nozzle, but the program was canceled due to lack of funding later that year. Although the F-16 VISTA program was considered successful, thrust vectoring was not taken up for the F-16 by the U.S. Air Force.

==== F-16U ====
The F-16U was one of several configurations proposed for the United Arab Emirates in the early 1990s. The F-16U was a two-seat aircraft that combined many features of the F-16XL and the delta wing of the F-16X.

==== F-16 Advanced Fighter Technology Integration ====
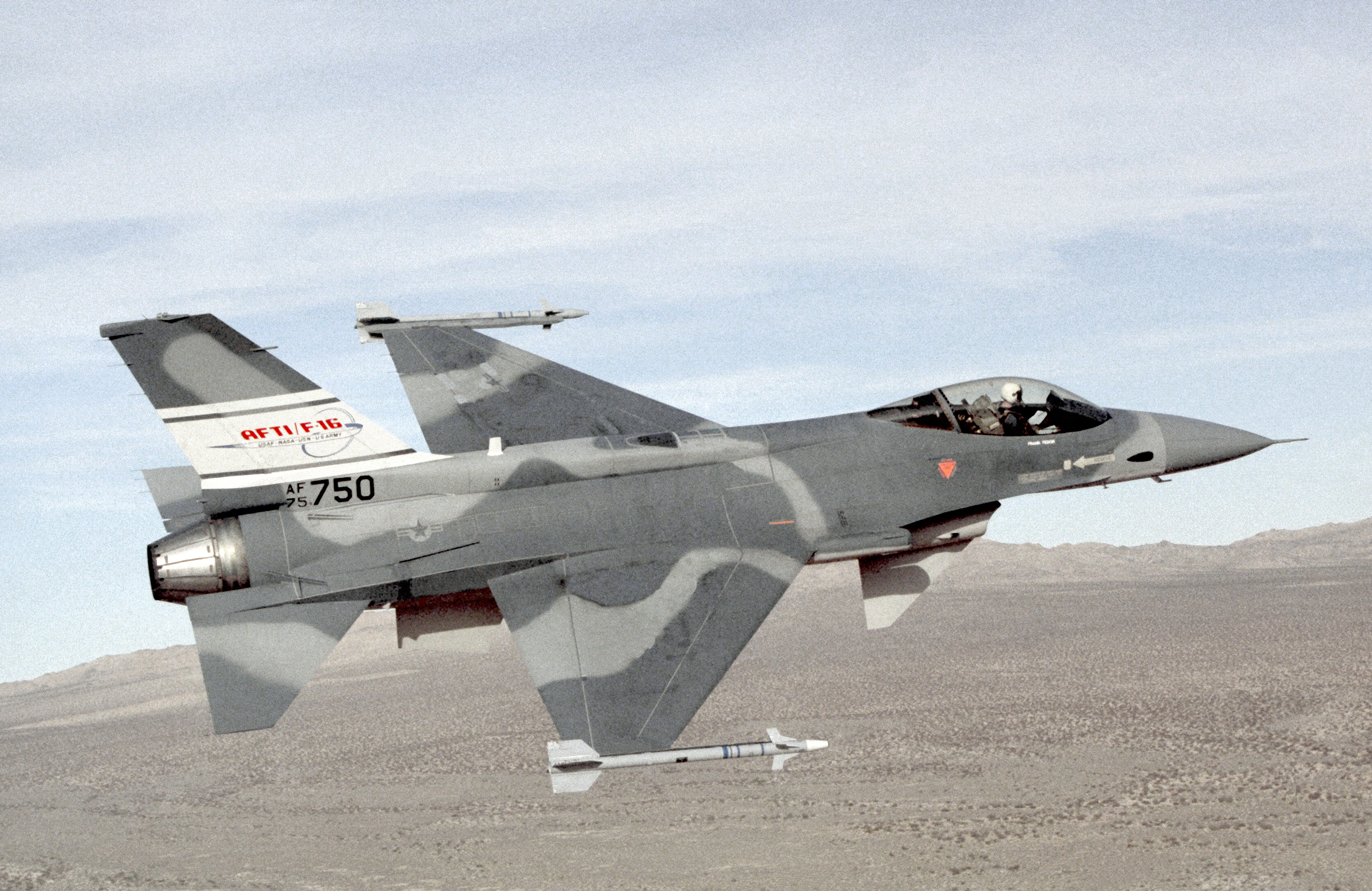
AFTI/F-16 in 1989

In March 1980, General Dynamics began converting the sixth FSD F-16A to serve as the technology demonstrator aircraft for the joint Flight Dynamics Laboratory-NASA Advanced Fighter Technology Integration (AFTI) program. The AFTI F-16 built upon GD's experience with its YF-16 CCV program, and the AFTI F-16 even received the twin pivoting vertical ventral fins from the CCV aircraft, which were likewise installed under the air intake. The aircraft was also fitted with a narrow dorsal fairing along its spine to house additional electronics. Technologies introduced and tested on the AFTI F-16 include a full-authority triplex Digital Flight Control System (DFCS), a six-degree-of-freedom Automated Maneuvering Attack System (AMAS), a 256-word-capacity Voice-Controlled Interactive Device (VCID) to control the avionics suite, and a helmet-mounted target designation sight that permitted the forward-looking infrared (FLIR) device and the radar to be automatically "slaved" to the pilot's head movement. First flight of the AFTI F-16 occurred on 10 July 1982. The Air Force Association gave its 1987 Theodore von Karman Award for the most outstanding achievement in science and engineering to the AFTI F-16 team.

The AFTI F-16 participated in numerous research and development programs:

- AFTI Phase I testing (1981–1983): a program to review the DFCS system, which undertook analysis of the VCID, to assess the impact of noise and g-force on speech recognition rates.
- AFTI Phase II testing (1983–1987): evaluation of the wing-root-mounted FLIR and the AMAS system.
- Auto GCAS development and testing (1986–1992): In 1986, members of the AFTI flight test team, in collaboration with General Dynamics, adapted the automated maneuvering capabilities with new ground collision avoidance equations and modified visual and aural cues to develop an automated ground collision avoidance (auto-GCAS) system. The system enabled pilots to set a mean sea level or above ground level floor for maneuvering, and included aural and visual warnings as the floor was approached. With no pilot action, the Auto-GCAS would take over and perform a 5-G pull up. This Auto-GCAS, which began flight testing in 1987, was intended to help reduce the incidence of "controlled flight into terrain" (CFIT) accidents. Later versions of the AFTI system included integration with the digital terrain database to provide 3-dimensional maneuvering capabilities. The flight test team that developed the system was awarded Patent No. US 4924401 A in 1990 for this system. This AFTI Auto-GCAS became the basis for the AGCAS system tested in 1994-96 and later incorporated into the F-16, F-22 and F-35.
- CAS/BAI (1988–1992): a five-phase evaluation program testing a variety of low-level close air support/battlefield air interdiction (CAS/BAI) techniques, including an Automatic Target Handoff System (ATHS) (which transferred target data from ground stations or other aircraft to the AFTI F-16) and off-axis weapons launch.
- Talon Sword Bravo (1993–1994): demonstration of cooperative engagement techniques where the aircraft fires at a target based on targeting information datalinked from a distant sensor; the weapon principally investigated was the AGM-88 High-speed Anti-Radiation Missile (HARM).
- EGI (1994 & 1997): testing of embedded GPS/INS (EGI) navigation systems, including evaluation of the reliability of GPS in jamming environments.
- AGCAS (1994–96): testing of an Automatic Ground Collision Avoidance System (AGCAS or Auto-GCAS) to help reduce the incidence of "controlled flight into terrain" (CFIT); lessons learned from this program were further evolved on the F-16 GCAS.
- J/IST (1997–2000): testing of the world's first all-electric flight control system under the Joint Strike Fighter Integrated Subsystem Technologies (J/IST) program.

==== F-16 GCAS ====
Due to the unavailability of the AFTI F-16 following the AGCAS effort, a Block 25 F-16D was modified for continued investigation of ground collision-avoidance system (GCAS) technologies to reduce CFIT incidents; this joint effort by the USAF, Lockheed Martin, NASA and the Swedish Air Force was conducted during 1997–98. It has recently been reported that the US Air Force had decided to upgrade the F-16, F-22 and F-35 (all Lockheed Martin-designed, fly-by-wire fighters) with the AGCAS system.

==== F-16 Agile Falcon ====
The F-16 Agile Falcon was a variant proposed by General Dynamics in 1984 that featured a 25% larger wing, upgraded engine, and some already planned MSIP IV improvements for the basic F-16. Unsuccessfully offered as a low-cost alternative for the Advanced Tactical Fighter (ATF) competition, some of its capabilities were incorporated into the F-16C/D Block 40, and the Agile Falcon would serve as the basis for developing Japan's F-2 fighter.

==== F-16 ES ====
The F-16 Enhanced Strategic (ES) was an extended-range variant of the F-16C/D fitted with conformal fuel tanks that granted it a 40% greater range over the standard Block 50. The F-16ES also featured an internal FLIR system, which offered the capabilities of the LANTIRN navigation and targeting system without the drag associated with external pods. Unsuccessfully offered to Israel as an alternative to the F-15I Strike Eagle in late 1993, it was one of several configuration options offered to the United Arab Emirates that would ultimately lead to the development of the F-16E/F Block 60 for that nation. An F-16C Block 30 was modified to the ES configuration to test the conformal tanks and simulated FLIR sensor turrets fitted above and below the nose of the aircraft. The F-16ES first flew on 5 November 1994 and flight testing was completed in January 1995.

==== F-16 LOAN ====
The F-16 Low-Observable Axisymmetric Nozzle (LOAN) demonstrator was an F-16C fitted in late 1996 with a prototype nozzle with significantly reduced radar and infrared signatures and lowered maintenance requirements. It was tested in November 1996 to evaluate the technology for the Joint Strike Fighter (JSF) program.

==== F-16D 'CK-1' ====
MANAT, the Israeli Air Force's flight test center, is known to operate a specially built Block 40 F-16D delivered in 1987 as a testbed aircraft designated 'CK-1'. It is used by the IAF for testing new flight configurations, weapon systems, and avionics.

==== F-16 DSI ====
The DSI concept (Diverterless supersonic inlet) was introduced into the JAST/JSF program as a trade study item in mid-1994. The first Lockheed DSI was flown on 11 December 1996 as part of a Technology Demonstration project. A DSI was installed on an F-16 Block 30 fighter, replacing the aircraft's original intake diverter. The modified F-16 demonstrated a maximum speed of Mach 2.0 (Mach 2.0 is the F-16's clean certified maximum speed) and handling characteristics similar to a normal F-16. Subsonic specific excess power was slightly improved. The trade studies involved additional CFD, testing, and weight and cost analyses. A DSI was later incorporated into the design of the Lockheed Martin F-35 Lightning II after proving to be 30% lighter and showing lower production and maintenance costs over traditional inlets while still meeting all performance requirements.

=== Engine variants ===
==== F-16/79 ====
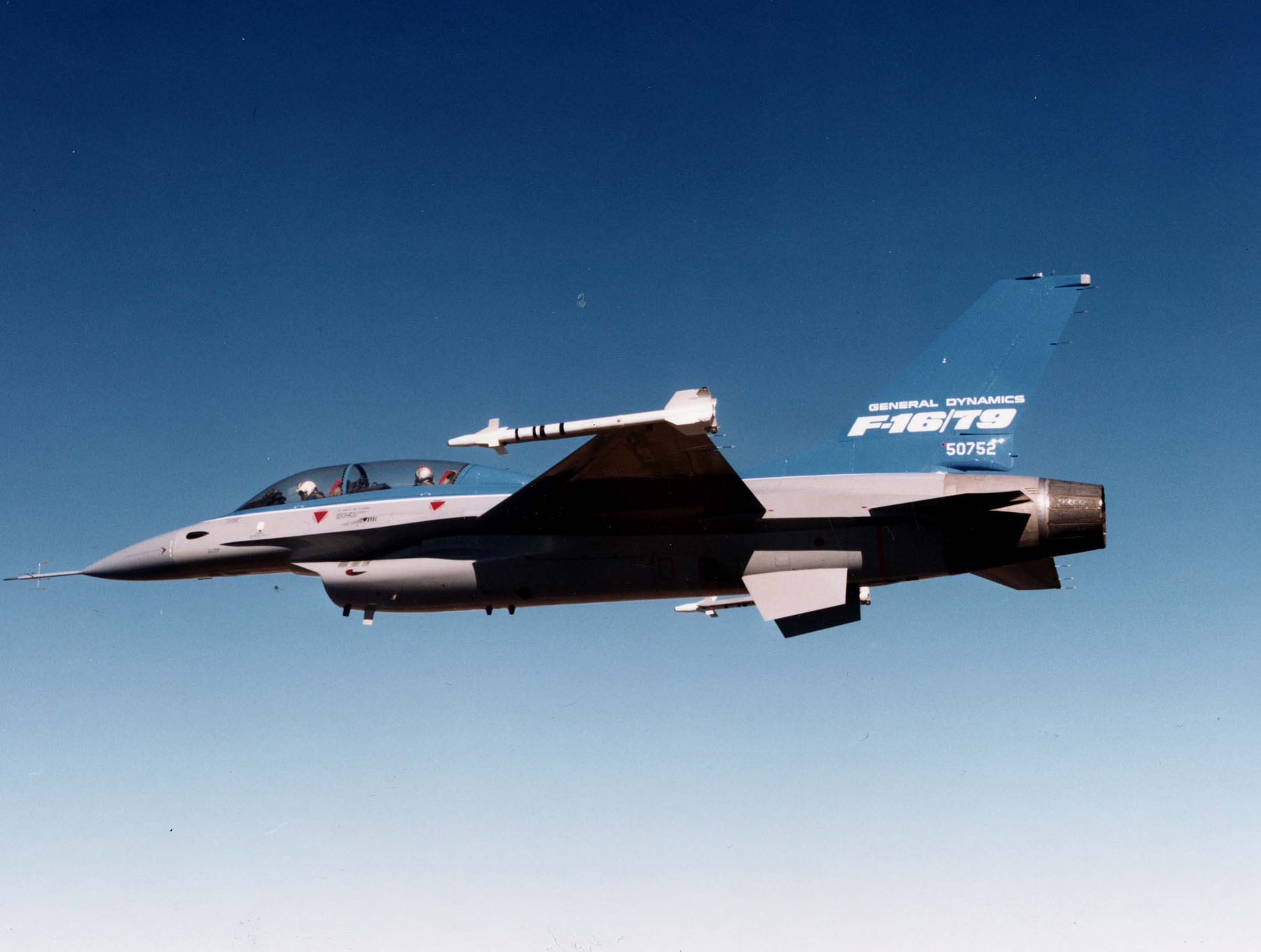
The prototype F-16/79

In response to President Jimmy Carter's February 1977 directive to curtail arms proliferation by selling only reduced-capability weapons to foreign countries, General Dynamics developed a modified export-oriented version of the F-16A/B designed for use with the outdated General Electric J79 turbojet engine. Northrop competed for this market with its F-20 Tigershark. Accommodating the J79-GE-119 engine required modification of the F-16's inlet, the addition of steel heat shielding, a transfer gearbox (to connect the engine to the existing F-16 gearbox), and an 18-inch (46 cm) stretch of the aft fuselage. First flight occurred on 29 October 1980. The total program cost to develop the F-16/J79 was US$18,000,000 (equivalent to $70,335,218 in 2025), and the unit flyaway cost was projected to be about US$8,000,000 (equivalent to $31,260,097 in 2025). South Korea, Pakistan and other nations were offered these fighters but rejected them, resulting in numerous exceptions being made to sell standard F-16s; with the later relaxation of the policy under President Carter in 1980 and its cancellation under President Ronald Reagan, no examples of either the F-16/79 or the F-20 were ultimately sold.

==== F-16/101 ====
In February 1979, General Electric was awarded a US$79,900,000 (equivalent to $354,439,477 in 2025) contract under the joint USAF/Navy Derivative Fighter Engine (DFE) program to develop a variant of its F101 turbofan engine, originally designed for the B-1A bomber, for use on the F-16 (in lieu of the standard P&W F100) and the F-14A (in place of the P&W TF30). The first Full-Scale Development (FSD) F-16A (serial number 75-0745) was fitted with the F101X DFE engine and made its maiden flight on 19 December 1980. Although the F101 performed better than the F100, it was not adopted for use; however, data from testing the F-16/101 assisted in the development of the F110 turbofan, for which the F101 would serve as the core, and the F110 would become an alternate engine for both the F-16 and F-14.

== Proposed and other variants ==
=== Vought Model 1600/1601/1602 ===
The Vought/General Dynamics Model 1600 was a navalized derivative of the General Dynamics F-16 Fighting Falcon designed for the United States Navy's Navy Air Combat Fighter (NACF) program. The Model 1600 lost to the Northrop/McDonnell Douglas F/A-18 Hornet.

=== F-16BR Block 62+ Super Viper ===
For the F-X2 fighter programme for the Brazilian Air Force, Lockheed Martin offered the F-16BR Super Viper. The F-16BR is based on the F-16E/F Block 60 and features conformal fuel tanks; AN/APG-80 AESA radar, GE F110-132A engine with FADEC controls; electronic warfare suite and infra-red searching (IRST); updated glass cockpit; and a helmet-mounted cueing system. F-16BR lost in the competition with JAS-39 Gripen E.

=== F-16IN Block 70/72 Super Viper ===
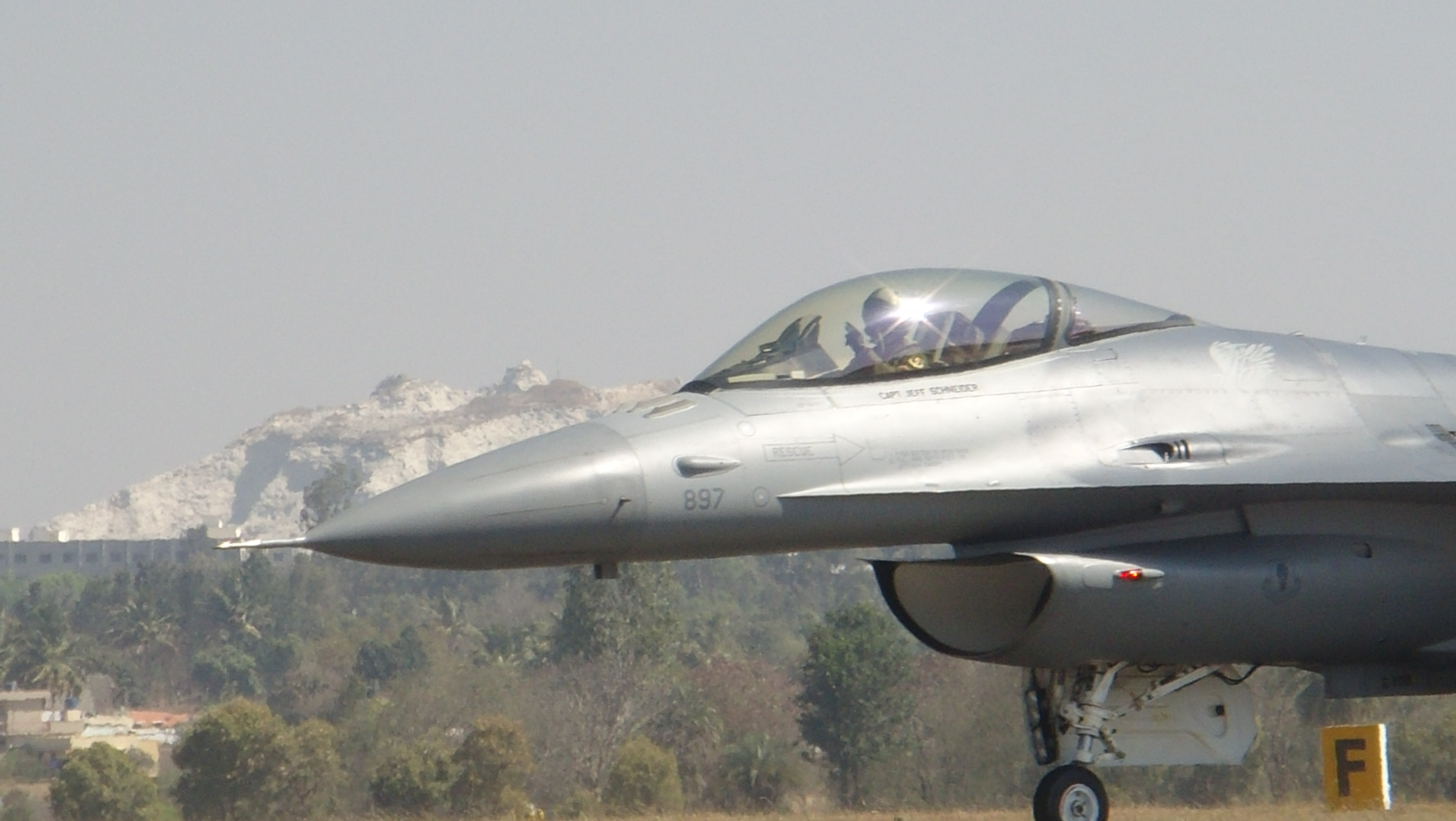
USAF F-16 Block 50 on ground taxiing to the runway for take-off at Aero India 2011, Yelahanka Air force Base Bangalore.

Lockheed Martin has proposed an advanced variant, the F-16IN, as its candidate for India's 126-aircraft Indian Air Force Medium Multi-Role Combat Aircraft (MMRCA) competition. According to Chuck Artymovich, the company's business development director for the program, "The F-16IN is the most advanced F-16 ever." Notable F-16IN features include an AN/APG-80 Active Electronically Scanned Array (AESA) radar, advanced electronic warfare suites, and an infrared search and track (IRST) system. In addition, the F-16IN's RCS is reduced from 1.5m^{2} to 0.1m^{2}, in the same class as the F-18 Super Hornet, Rafale, and Eurofighter Typhoon.

If selected as the winner of the competition, Lockheed Martin will supply the first 18 aircraft, and will set up an assembly line in India in collaboration with Indian partners for production of the remainder. The program is reportedly worth up to ₹550 billion (US$14 billion). The F-16IN Super Viper was showcased in the Aero India, 2009.

India initially sent the RFI for an F-16C/D Block 52+ configuration aircraft for the ongoing Indian MRCA competition to supply the Indian Air Force with 126 Multi-Role Combat Aircraft, to replace the Indian air force's fleet of MiG-21s. On 17 January 2008, Lockheed Martin offered a customized version of the F-16, the F-16IN Super Viper for the Indian MMRCA contract. The F-16IN, which is similar to the F-16 Block 60, will be a 4.5 generation aircraft.

Lockheed Martin has described the F-16IN as "the most advanced and capable F-16 ever." Based closely on the F-16E/F Block 60 as supplied to the UAE, the features on the F-16IN include Conformal fuel tanks (CFTs); AN/APG-80 AESA radar, GE F110-132A engine with 32,000 pounds (143 kN) of thrust with FADEC controls; electronic warfare suite and infra-red search and track (IRST); advanced all-color glass cockpit with three large displays; and a helmet-mounted cueing system. Lockheed Martin's vice-president-Business Development (India) Orville Prins has said that "I can assure you, the Super Viper is much more advanced in all aspects than the [Block 50/52+] F-16s being given to Pakistan".

In September 2009, F-16IN Super Viper completed a part of the field trials. Lockheed Martin officials stated that phase I of field trials was over and the week-long training phase was in preparation for Phase II of field trials, which began 7 September and lasted two weeks.

Eventually, the F-16IN Super Viper lost out to the French Dassault Rafale fighter. It was reported 21 September 2012 that the Indian air force would finalize a contract to purchase 126 French Rafale jet fighters that year, in one of 2012's largest armament purchases. The contract for the 126 Rafale twin-engine, canard delta-wing, multirole combat aircraft is worth $20 billion, Indo-Asian News Service reported.

In 2015, after the Rafale order was cut back to just 36 aircraft, Lockheed was offering India the exclusive opportunity to produce, operate and export F-16 Block 70 aircraft.

In 2017, the F-16IN lost in the competition with JAS-39 Gripen E, when Lockheed retired from production in India and decided to move its production line from Fort Worth, Texas to Greenville, South Carolina.

As of 2017, Lockheed Martin has agreed to sign a letter of intent with the Indian defence firm Tata Advanced Systems Limited to manufacture the jets in India if the Indian government accepts their tender for India's request for a purchase of single-engine aircraft to replace its aging MiG-series fighters. The new production line can be utilized to supply jets to India as well as for exporting them overseas. On 19 June 2017, during the Paris Air Show, Tata Advanced Systems Limited and Lockheed Martin signed an agreement to produce F-16 Block 70 aircraft in India under the latter's offer to provide the jet to the Indian Air Force under MMRCA. However, the Indian Air Force declined to buy the aircraft, and production never took place.

=== F-21 ===
After cancelling the MMRCA tender, the Indian Air Force launched another Request for Information in April 2018 for another tender for around 110 aircraft which was unofficially referred to as MRFA.

Meanwhile, Tata Advanced Systems Limited and Lockheed Martin signed another agreement to produce F-16 wings in India on 4 September 2018. As of September 2019, the prototype wing from the Indian facility would be delivered by 2020. The wing prototype made in the Hyderabad facility of Tata-Lockheed Martin Aerostructures Ltd (TLMAL) was delivered and certified in December 2021, paving way for the facility to be the sole provider of F-16 wings to Lockheed Martin. The wings were described as "a fuel-carrying 9G, 12,000-hour, interchangeable and replaceable fighter wing". It is the same facility which is also the sole provider of empennages of C-130J at a rate of 24 units per year and produced 85 units by April 2018.

Lockheed Martin unveiled the F-21 concept at the Aero India air show on 20 February 2019. The F-21 would include 114 "Indian Specific Enhancements". Lockheed Martin had offered the F-16IN variant earlier in the MMRCA tender and has replaced the offer with the current F-21 which is to be built in collaboration with Tata Advanced Systems in the available Hyderabad facility. However, the Indian Air Force declined to buy the aircraft, and production never took place.

Specific enhancements and changes of the F-21 aircraft includes:

- Avionics: Northrop Grumman AN/APG-83 Scalable Agile Beam Radar (SABR) AESA radar with higher range, more targets and higher precision couple with long range Infrared Search and Track system.
- Advanced Cockpit: a Large Area Display and a 6″ × 8″ Center Pedestal Display similar to the ones on Lockheed Martin F-35 Lightning II as against the F-16 Block 70 variant.
- Weapons Capacity: 40% higher payload capacity with options for one Triple Missile Launch Adapter on each wing.
- Decoy: Capability to carry AN/ALE-50 towed decoy system on wing pylon as well as tail section. (Block 70 variant would only carry TDS on wing pylons)
- Airframe: Redesigned dorsal fin. A service life of 12,000 hours.
- Powerplant: General Electric F-110-GE-132 engine
- Aerial refueling: Options for both probe-and-drogue and flying boom with added conformal fuel tank for higher range.

=== KF-16 ===
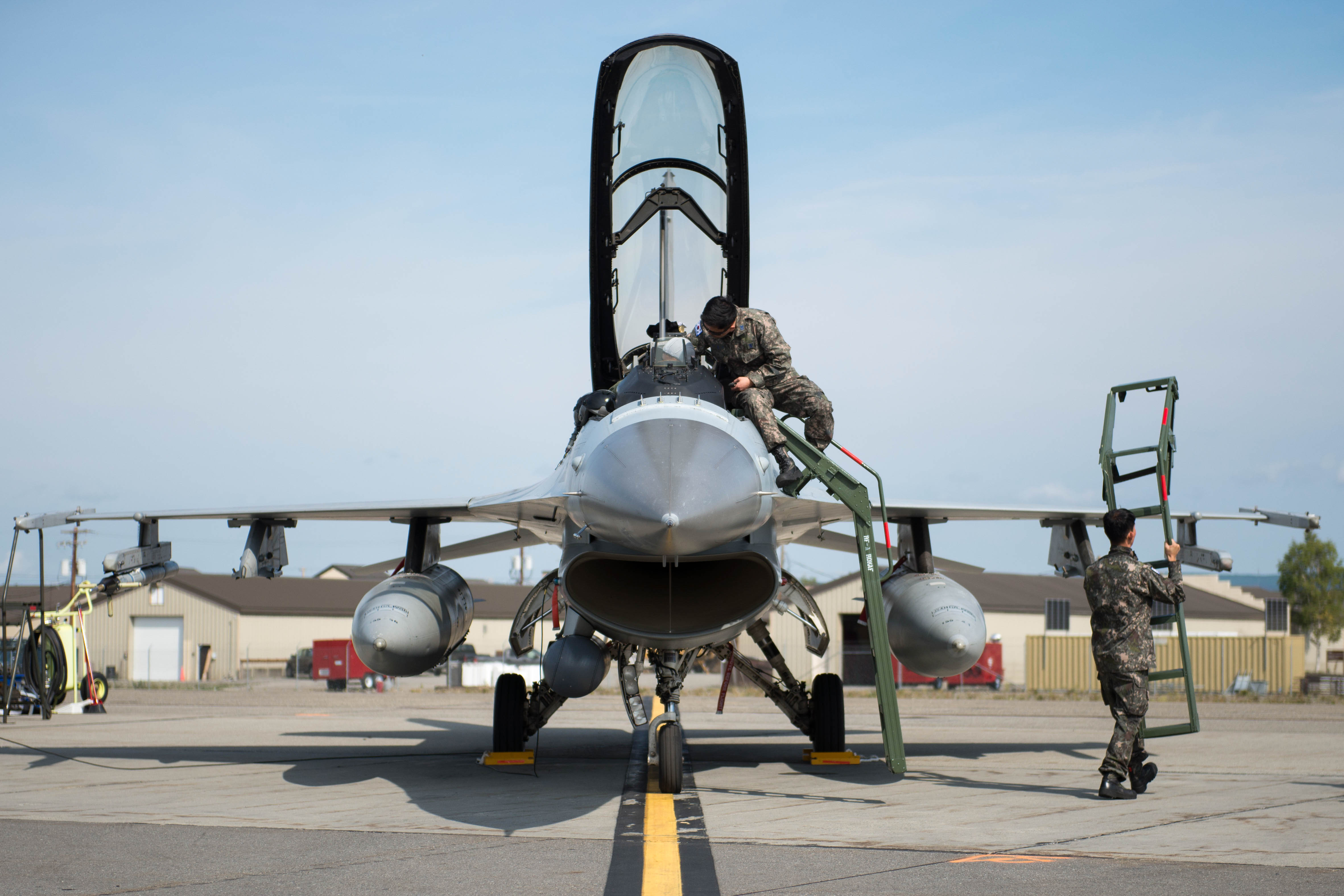
ROKAF KF-16 at Eielson Air Force Base

Korean Aerospace Industries (KAI) produced 140 KF-16C/D Block 52 fighters under license from Lockheed Martin in the 1990s. The F/A-18 Hornet had originally won the Korea Fighter Program (KFP) competition, but disputes over costs and accusations of bribery led the Korean government to withdraw the award and select the F-16 instead. Designated the KF-16 the first 12 aircraft were delivered to Republic of Korea Air Force (ROKAF) in December 1994. Almost 2,500 parts are changed from the original F-16C/D. Originally, the KF-16 was equipped with the Pratt & Whitney F100-PW-229 Improved Performance Engine, ASPJ internal ECM, AN/APG-68(V)7 radar, LANTIRN targeting and navigation pod, AMRAAM, HARM, and SLAM anti-ship missile capabilities, and advanced IFF. JDAMs capability was added by ROKAF later on; ROKAF developed the software, successfully carried out 3 tests, and finished pilot training at the end of January 2011. The South Korean JDAMs are equipped with wing kits, which are absent from normal JDAMs, but not from the 2,000-pound JDAM Extended Range kit, which is being developed by Boeing and South Korea. The South Korean F-16s can also employ LIG Nex1's ALQ-200K radar jammer and other locally developed tactical ELINT and EO/IR targeting pods.

In late 2011, Korea kicked off the contest for KF-16's mid-life upgrade, which will incorporate, among others, a new AESA radar. The radar candidates are Northrop Grumman's Scalable Agile Beam Radar (SABR) and Raytheon's RANGR, which won the contract. The variant to which the planes will be improved is reported to be Lockheed Martin's newly developed F-16V. The KF-16 will also be integrated with stealth cruise missiles. The proposed budget for the avionics upgrades and weapons integration of 135 KF-16 planes is $1 billion. ROKAF had requested a separate upgrade of its 35 F-16 Block 32 in 2009, which would allow the upgraded planes to employ JDAM, AMRAAM, improved data modem, secure voice capabilities, test and support equipment, and other related training and logistics support. The estimated cost of the upgrade was $250 million. BAE won the contract for $1.1 billion.

=== GF-16 ===
Small numbers of each type of F-16A/B/C are used for non-flying ground instruction of maintenance personnel.

=== QF-16 ===
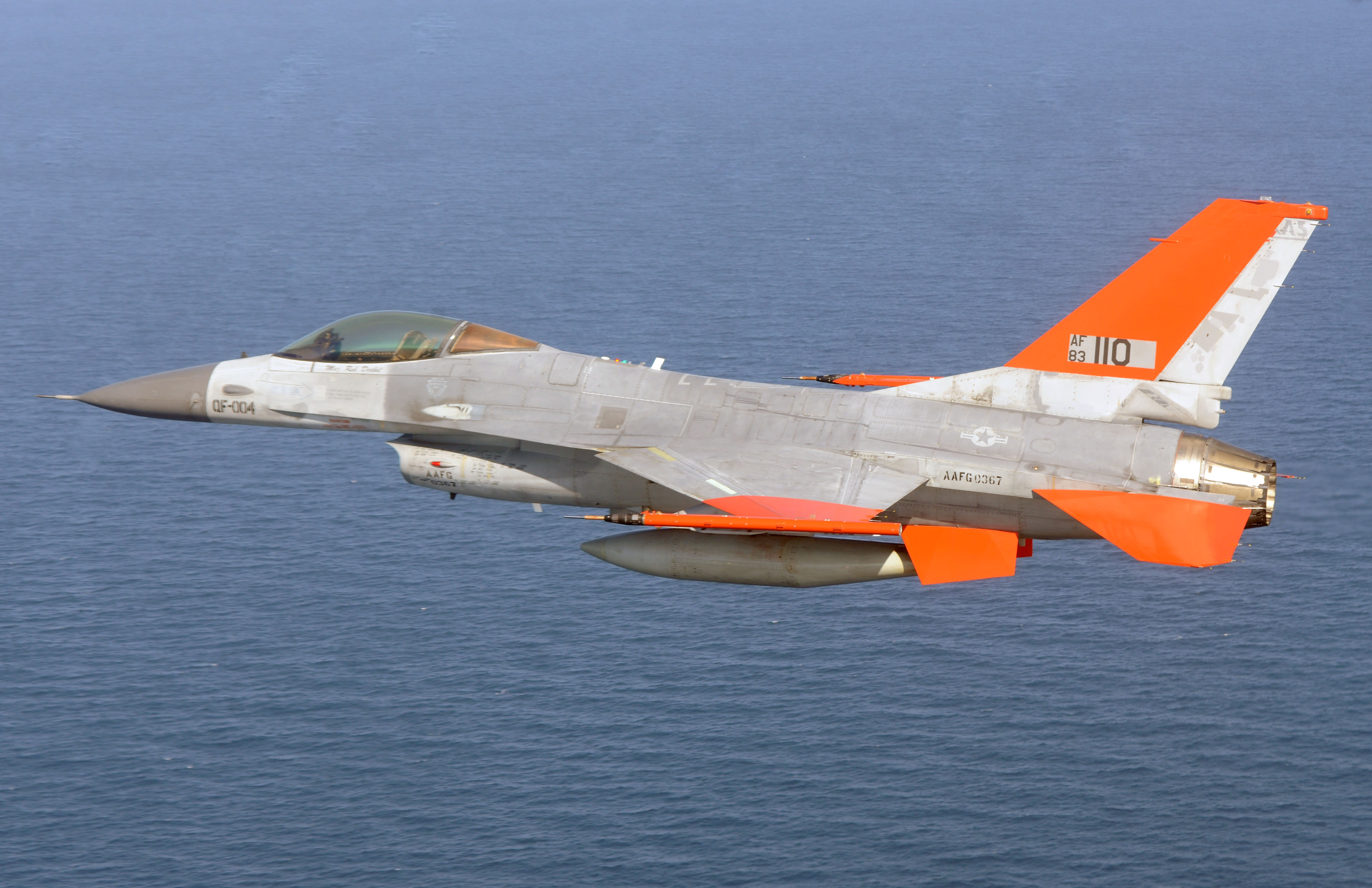
A QF-16 unmanned aerial target drone of the 82nd Aerial Targets Squadron on its first unmanned flight over the Gulf of Mexico in 2013

The USAF plans to convert Block 15 F-16As, and Block 25/30 F-16Cs into full-scale target drones under the QF-16 Air Superiority Target (AST) program. These AST drones are used in Weapon System Evaluation Programs (WSEP) for assessing upgrades or replacements for air-to-air missiles (AAM), and they are also useful for giving pilots the experience of a live AAM shot and kill prior to entering combat. QF-16s replaced the QF-4 drones, the last of which flew in 2016. The Air Force's Air Armament Center hosted its first "Industry Day" for interested vendors at Eglin AFB, Florida on 16–19 July 2007. The DoD awarded the nearly $70 million QF-16 Full Scale Aerial Target (FSAT) contract to Boeing on 8 March 2010, with the first delivery scheduled for 2014.

On 22 April 2010, the first F-16 to be converted to an aerial target arrived at Boeing's facility at Cecil Field, Jacksonville, Florida. Six F-16s will be modified during the development phase, as prototypes for engineering tests and evaluation. From 2014, up to 126 QF-16 drones will be created. The prototype QF-16 undertook its maiden flight in May 2012. In January 2013, the 576th Aerospace Maintenance and Regeneration Squadron refit team was due to begin modification work on the QF-16 program. Davis-Monthan has 210 F-16s stocked for conversion. From that pool, the Air Force will draw airframes for its 126 planned QF-16 drones. F-16C Block 30B s/n 85-1569 was the first aircraft delivered in November 2012.

On 19 September 2013, an empty F-16 jet tested by Boeing and US Air Force, two US Air Force pilots controlled the plane from the ground as it flew from Tyndall Air Force Base, Panama City, Florida. Boeing suggested that the innovation could ultimately be used to help train pilots, providing an adversary they could practice firing on. The jet – which had previously sat mothballed at an Arizona site for 15 years – flew at an altitude of 40,000 ft (12.2 km) and a speed of Mach 1.47 (1,119 mph/1,800 km/h). It carried out a series of maneuvers including a barrel roll and a "split S" – a move in which the aircraft turns upside down before making a half loop so that it flies the right-way-up in the opposite direction. This can be used in combat to evade missile lock-ons. The firm added that the flight attained 7 g of acceleration but was capable of carrying out maneuvers at 9 g – something that might cause physical problems for a pilot. Boeing was awarded the contract on 10 October 2013 for low-rate initial production (LRIP) Lot 1 of 13 QF-16s. A second award on 20 May 2014 covered production Lot 2, comprising a further 23 QF-16s. On 27 March 2015, Boeing received a US$24.46 million (~$31.5 million in 2024) contract for 25 Lot 3 QF-16s and 25 four-year warranties of the QF-16 drone-peculiar equipment. The first production Lot 1 FSAT, QF-16C, 86-0233, 'QF-007', was delivered on 11 March 2015 to Tyndall Air Force Base. It was previously operated by the Michigan Air National Guard's 107th Fighter Squadron, 127th Wing and then stored at the 309th AMARG before being moved to Cecil Field in April 2013 for QF-16 configuring.

On 19 July 2017, the first QF-16 was shot down during a Combat Archer Weapons System Evaluation Program (WSEP) exercise.

== Derivative fighters ==
The performance and flexibility of the F-16 has been an important and visible influence on aircraft development programs of three nations seeking to advance the design and manufacturing skills of their indigenous aerospace industries. These programs have partnered with Lockheed Martin to develop airframes, that while not officially designated F-16s, share design elements and a development path with the F-16.

=== AIDC F-CK-1A/B Ching Kuo Indigenous Defense Fighter (IDF) ===
Due to an American refusal to supply Taiwan with either the F-16/79 or F-20, the Republic of China government tasked its Aerospace Industrial Development Corporation (AIDC) with developing an indigenous fighter. Preliminary design studies began in 1980, and the Indigenous Defense Fighter (IDF) program was launched two years later. Since Taiwanese industry had not developed a sophisticated fighter before, AIDC sought design and development assistance from General Dynamics and other major American aerospace companies. With such assistance, a design was finalized in 1985. The IDF design is by no means a copy of the F-16, but it was clearly influenced by the F-16, such as the layout of control surfaces, yet it also features design elements from the F-5, like its twin-engine configuration. Several components were supplied by Western companies. In December 1988 the IDF aircraft was designated F-CK-1 and named after the late President Chiang Ching-Kuo. The first of four prototypes (three single-seat and one twin-seat) flew on 28 May 1989. A total of 130 Ching Kuo fighters (102 F-CK-1A single-seaters and 28 F-CK-1B two-seaters) were delivered from 1994 to 2000.

=== Mitsubishi F-2A/B (FS-X/TFS-X) ===
In 1982, Japan's Technical Research and Development Institute (TRDI) initiated studies of options for an indigenous fighter design to replace the Mitsubishi F-1 strike fighter. This initiative would later be designated FS-X (Fighter Support Experimental; the two-seat trainer version was originally designated 'TFS-X'.) Determining that an entirely indigenous development effort would be cost-prohibitive, the Defense Agency (JDA) sought an off-the-shelf fighter for its FS-X requirement, but none proved entirely acceptable. As a result, the JDA sought a co-development program based on a variant of an existing fighter type, and on 21 October 1987 announced its selection of a modified version of the F-16C/D based on General Dynamics' "Agile Falcon" concept. The FS-X is larger and heavier than the F-16, has a greater wing area, and is mainly fitted with Japanese-developed avionics and equipment. The program was launched a year later and the first of four XF-2A/B prototypes flew on 7 October 1995. The Japanese Cabinet authorized production on 15 December 1995, with the designation F-2A/B being allocated to the single- and two-seat models, respectively. First flight of an F-2A occurred on 12 October 1999, and production aircraft deliveries began on 25 September 2000. Originally, 141 F-2A/B (83 F-2A and 58 F-2B) were planned, but only 130 (83/47 F-2A/B) were approved in 1995; due to high costs, in December 2004, the total was capped at 98 aircraft, and in early 2007 this was reduced to 94.

=== KAI FA-50 Golden Eagle (KTX-2) ===
Building on its licensed manufacture of KF-16s, in 1992 Samsung Aerospace began work on designing a tandem-seat, supersonic, combat-capable jet trainer to replace the BAE Hawk 67, Northrop T-38 Talon, A-37 Dragonfly, and eventually F-4 Phantom II and F-5E/F Tiger II operated by the Republic of Korea Air Force (ROKAF). Samsung worked closely with Lockheed and the basic KTX-2 design had been laid out by 1995. At this point the aerospace units of Samsung, Daewoo and Hyundai were combined to form Korea Aerospace Industries (KAI) to ensure sufficient industrial "critical mass" existed to successfully develop the KTX-2. The T-50 resembles an 80%-scale F-16, but has a number of differences, not least being the fact that it has an engine air intake under each wing root, instead of a single under-belly intake, as well as a leading-edge extension more similar to that on the F/A-18 Hornet. The South Korean government gave its approval on 3 July 1997, and full-scale development work got underway in October. In February 2000, the KTX-2 was designated the T-50 Golden Eagle, and the first of two T-50 flight-test prototypes flew on 20 August 2002; the maiden flight of the first of two T-50 Lead-In Fighter Trainer (LIFT) prototypes – designated 'A-50' by the ROKAF and capable of combat – followed on 29 August 2003. Lockheed Martin and KAI co-marketed the T-50 internationally. The RoKAF plans to acquire T-50 advanced trainers, T-50B aerobatic demonstrators, TA-50 LIFT/light attack aircraft, and FA-50 multirole fighters. Its first production contract, for 25 T-50s, was placed in December 2003 and the first pair of T-50 aircraft was delivered 29 December 2005, with the type entering operational service in April 2007. In December 2006, the ROKAF placed a second production contract for T-50, T-50B, and TA-50 variants. The development of the FA-50 to replace the remaining old fighters is ongoing as of 2010.

== Specifications ==
	YF-16	F-16A/B	F-16C/D Block 30	F-16E/F Block 60	F-16 Block 70
Crew	One (A/C/E model) / Two (B/D/F model)				One
Length	48 ft 5 in (14.8 m)	49 ft 6 in (15.1 m)	49 ft 5 in (15.1 m)	49 ft 4 in (15.0 m)	49.3 ft (15.027 m)
Wingspan	31 ft 0 in (9.45 m)	31 ft 0 in (9.45 m)	31 ft 0 in (9.45 m)	31 ft 0 in (9.45 m)	31.0 ft (9.449 m)
Height	16 ft 3 in (4.95 m)	16 ft 8 in (5.08 m)	16 ft 8 in (5.08 m)	16 ft 8 in (5.08 m)	16.7 ft (5.090 m)
Empty weight	13,600 lb (6,170 kg)	16,300 lb (7,390 kg)	18,900 lb (8,570 kg)	22,000 lb (9,980 kg)	20,300 lb (9,210 kg)
Maximum take-off weight		37,500 lb (17,000 kg)	42,300 lb (19,200 kg)	46,000 lb (20,900 kg)	48,000 lb (21,800 kg)
Maximum speed	Mach 2.0				Mach 2+
Combat radius			295 nmi (546 km)		
Engine	PW F100-PW-200	PW F100-PW-200	GE F110-GE-100	GE F110-GE-132	GE F110-GE-129
Thrust	23,800 lbf (106 kN)	23,800 lbf (106 kN)	28,600 lbf (127 kN)	32,500 lbf (145 kN)	29,400 lbf (131 kN)
Radar		AN/APG-66	AN/APG-68	AN/APG-80	AN/APG-83

Sources: USAF sheet, International Directory of Military Aircraft, Great Book, F-16 versions on F-16.net, Lockheed Martin
