= AN/APG-85 =

F-35 Lightning II fire-control radar

The AN/APG-85 is an active electronically scanned array (AESA) fire-control radar developed by Northrop Grumman for the Lockheed Martin F-35 Lightning II.

It is a further development of the AN/APG-81 and is intended to equip all three variants of the F-35 as part of the aircraft's Block 4 modernization, beginning with Lot 17 production. Northrop Grumman has described it as an advanced multifunction sensor intended to defeat current and projected air and surface threats and to improve the aircraft's battlespace situational awareness. Detailed performance specifications have not been disclosed and remain classified.

Northrop Grumman publicly disclosed the radar in January 2023. Development delays subsequently made the timing of the radar's integration with the F-35 production schedule uncertain. Because the APG-85 requires a redesigned mounting that cannot accept the older APG-81, aircraft built for the new radar began to be delivered without any radar installed.

As of June 2026, the United States Marine Corps had accepted six F-35B aircraft fitted with ballast in place of a radar, with United States Air Force and United States Navy aircraft expected to follow later in the year.

== Development ==
Northrop Grumman, which also produces the F-35's existing APG-81, revealed in January 2023 that it was developing the APG-85 as a successor radar, to be developed and built at its facilities in Linthicum, Maryland. The radar was planned as a key component of the F-35's Block 4 upgrade and was to be introduced within the Lot 17 production batch, initially on approximately the last seven aircraft of that lot.

== Design and capabilities ==
Like the APG-81, the APG-85 is an active electronically scanned array radar, and Northrop Grumman has said it is compatible with all three F-35 variants. Program officials testified in 2026 that, at full capability, the radar would eventually require between 62 and 80 kilowatts of power, while the F-35's existing cooling system was limited to about 32 kilowatts.

== Delays and radarless F-35 deliveries ==
The Block 4 modernization for the F-35 of which the APG-85 is a part has experienced substantial delays and cost growth. A September 2025 Government Accountability Office report found the Block 4 effort to be at least five years behind schedule and more than $6 billion over its earlier cost estimate.

The APG-85 is not interchangeable with the APG-81. It is a different size, so aircraft built to carry it use a redesigned bulkhead in the nose, and the older APG-81 cannot be fitted into the space prepared for the newer radar. As a result, F-35s built from Lot 17 with the new mounting could not revert to the older radar when the APG-85 was not ready, and instead began to be delivered with ballast installed in the nose in place of a radar. The configuration leaves the aircraft flyable but limits them to training and prevents them from being certified for combat.

The first F-35B flew an acceptance flight with ballast rather than a radar in the last week of February 2026. At a Senate Armed Services Committee hearing in June 2026, the head of the F-35 Joint Program Office, Lieutenant General Gregory Masiello, disclosed that the Marine Corps had accepted six F-35Bs without radars and said he would not count such aircraft as fully mission capable. Air Force and Navy aircraft were expected to be delivered in the same configuration later in 2026.

Although they lack an onboard radar, the affected aircraft retain the F-35's electro-optical distributed aperture system, which provides 360-degree awareness, and the type's data-sharing capability allows a radarless jet to make use of the radar of another F-35 or of a nearby airborne early-warning aircraft.

The delay reflected the radar's greater power and cooling demands as well as the time required to certify the more complex system, and the first production APG-85 was not expected to be delivered before 2028. A common mounting able to accept either the APG-81 or the APG-85 was planned for Lot 20. The radar's full capability also depends on an upgrade to the F-35's F135 engine. Program officials expected this engine core upgrade, which would add power and thermal-management capacity, to be fielded in 2031.

== See also ==
- AN/APG-77
- AN/APG-79
- AN/APG-83
- List of radars
- List of military electronics of the United States
