= Low-probability-of-intercept radar =

Radar technology that hides its activity from a detected target

A low-probability-of-intercept radar (LPIR) is a radar employing measures to avoid detection by passive radar detection equipment (such as a radar warning receiver (RWR), or electronic support receiver) while it is searching for a target or engaged in target tracking. This characteristic is desirable in a radar because it allows finding and tracking an opponent without alerting them to the radar's presence. This also protects the radar installation from anti-radiation missiles (ARMs).

LPI measures include:

- Power management
- High duty cycle, meaning the transmitter is on most of the time (long integration times)
- Wide bandwidth (or Ultra-wideband)
- Frequency agility, and frequency selection
- Advanced/irregular scan patterns
- Coded pulses (coherent detection)
- High processing gain
- Low sidelobe antennas

== Rationale ==
Radar systems work by sending out a signal and then listening for its echo off distant objects. Each of these paths, to and from the target, is subject to the inverse square law of propagation in both the transmitted signal and the signal reflected back. That means that a radar's received energy drops with the fourth power of the distance, which is why radar systems require high powers, often in the megawatt range, to be effective at long range.

The radar signal being sent out is a simple radio signal, and can be received with a simple radio receiver. Military aircraft and ships have defensive receivers, called radar warning receivers (RWR), which detect when an enemy radar beam is on them, thus revealing the position of the enemy. Unlike the radar unit, which must send the pulse out and then receive its reflection, the target's receiver does not need the reflection and thus the signal drops off only as the square of distance. This means that the receiver, assuming no disparity in antenna size, is always at an advantage over the radar in terms of range - it will always be able to detect the signal long before the radar can see the target's echo. Since the position of the radar is extremely useful information in an attack on that platform, this means that radars generally must be turned off for lengthy periods if they are subject to attack; this is common on ships, for instance.

Unlike the radar, which knows in which direction it is sending its signal, the receiver simply gets a pulse of energy and has to interpret it. Since the radio spectrum is filled with noise, the receiver's signal is integrated over a short period of time, making periodic sources like a radar add up and stand out over the random background. The rough direction can be calculated using a rotating antenna, or similar passive array using phase or amplitude comparison. Typically RWRs store the detected pulses for a short period of time, and compare their broadcast frequency and pulse repetition frequency against a database of known radars. The direction to the source is normally combined with symbology indicating the likely purpose of the radar – Airborne early warning and control, surface-to-air missile, etc.

This technique is much less useful against a radar with a frequency-agile (solid state) transmitter. Because agile radars like AESA (or PESA) can change their frequency with every pulse (except when using doppler filtering), and generally do so using a random sequence, integrating over time does not help pull the signal out of the background noise. Moreover, a radar may be designed to extend the duration of the pulse and lower its peak power. An AESA or modern PESA will often have the capability to alter these parameters during operation. This makes no difference to the total energy reflected by the target but makes the detection of the pulse by an RWR system less likely. Nor does the AESA have any sort of fixed pulse repetition frequency, which can also be varied and thus hide any periodic brightening across the entire spectrum. Older generation RWRs are essentially useless against AESA radars, which is why AESAs are also known as "low probability of intercept radars". Modern RWRs must be made highly sensitive (small angles and bandwidths for individual antennas, low transmission loss and noise) and add successive pulses through time-frequency processing to achieve useful detection rates.

== Methods ==
=== Signal modification ===
Ways of reducing the profile of a radar include using wider bandwidth (wideband, Ultra-wideband), frequency hopping, using FMCW, and using only the minimum power required for the task. Using pulse compression also reduces the probability of detection, since the peak transmitted power is lower while the range and resolution is the same.

=== Antenna modification ===
Constructing a radar so as to emit minimal side and back lobes may also reduce the probability of interception when it is not pointing at the radar warning receiver. However, when the radar is sweeping a large volume of space for targets, it is likely that the main lobe will repeatedly be pointing at the RWR. Modern phased-array radars not only control their side lobes, they also use very thin, fast-moving beams of energy in complicated search patterns. This technique may be enough to confuse the RWR so it does not recognize the radar as a threat, even if the signal itself is detected.

In addition to stealth considerations, reducing side and back lobes is desirable as it makes the radar more difficult to characterise. This can increase the difficulty in determining which type it is (concealing information about the carrying platform) and make it much harder to jam.

== List of LPI radars ==
Systems that feature LPIR include modern active electronically scanned array (AESA) radars such as that on the F/A-18E/F Super Hornet and the passive electronically scanned array (PESA) radar on the S-300PMU-2 surface-to-air missile system.

Radar	Manufacturer	Type	Platform
AN/APG-77	Northrop Grumman		F-22 Raptor
AN/APG-79	Raytheon		F/A-18E/F
AN/APG-81	Northrop Grumman		F-35 Lightning II
AN/APG-85	Northrop Grumman		F-35 Lightning II (Block 4)
AN/APQ-181	Hughes Aircraft (now Raytheon)		B-2A Spirit
AN/APS-147	Telephonics Corporation	Inverse Synthetic-aperture radar (ISAR)	MH60R
AN/APG-78	Northrop Grumman	millimeter-wave fire-control radar (FCR)	AH-64 Apache
APAR	Thales Nederland	multifunction 3D radar (MFR)	
LANTIRN	Lockheed Martin		F-16 Fighting Falcon
SCOUT	Thales Nederland	FMCW	
SMART-L	Thales Nederland	FMCW	
RBS-15 MK3 ASCM	Saab	FMCW, SAR	
SQUIRE	Thales Nederland	FMCW	
HARD-3D (see ASRAD-R)	Ericsson Microwave Systems (now Saab)		
EAGLE Fire-Control Radar	Ericsson Microwave Systems (now Saab)		
POINTER Radar System	Ericsson Microwave Systems (now Saab)		
CRM-100	Przemyslowy instytut telekomunikacji	FMCW with 10 switched frequencies	
JY-17A	(China)	Digital phase coding, random FSK and pulse doppler processing (see Pulse-Doppler signal processing)	
PAGE (Portable Air-defence Guard Equipment)		FMCW	ZSU-23-4
Uttam AESA Radar	Electronics and Radar Development Establishment, DRDO, India	Solid state GaAs based AESA radar	HAL Tejas
CAPTOR-E	Hensoldt, BAE Systems, Leonardo S.p.A., Thales Group, Airbus Defence and Space	GaAs HEMT (Mk.0, Mk.1) or GaAs and GaN HEMT (Mk.2) based AESA radar	Eurofighter Typhoon

== See also ==
- Echolocation jamming
- Electronic warfare
- Electronic countermeasure
- Electronic warfare support measures
- Active electronically scanned array
