= Northrop Grumman Electronic Systems =

Business unit of Northrop Grumman

Northrop Grumman Electronic Systems (NGES) was a business segment of Northrop Grumman from 1996 to 2015, until a reorganization on January 1 2016 merged other Northrop Grumman businesses into NGES to form a new segment called Mission Systems. NGES had originally been created by Northrop Grumman's acquisition of Westinghouse Electronic Systems Group in 1996. The Electronic Systems sector was a designer, developer, and manufacturer of a wide variety of advanced defense electronics and systems. The division had 120 locations worldwide, including 72 international offices, and approximately 24,000 employees; accounting for 20% of company sales in 2005.

== Organization divisions ==
Headquartered outside Baltimore in Linthicum, Maryland near the Baltimore airport (BWI), Northrop Grumman Electronic Systems was organized into the following divisions:

- Advanced Concepts & Technologies
- Aerospace Systems
- Naval & Marine Systems
- Defensive Systems
- Navigation Systems
- Government Systems
- Space & ISR Systems

== Systems ==
Northrop Grumman Electronic Systems provided:

- Airborne radar systems
- Secondary surveillance systems
- Inertial navigation systems and sensors
- Electronic warfare systems
- Precision weapons
- Air traffic control systems
- Air defense systems
- Communications systems
- Space systems
- Marine and Naval systems
- Integrated avionics systems
- Postal automation and information systems

== Key products ==
Key products included active electronically scanned array fire control radars for the F-16, F-22, and F-35 fighter aircraft, as well as the Longbow Fire Control Radar for the AH-64 Apache helicopter. Other products included the AWACS radar, the Boeing 737-based Wedgetail MESA airborne early warning and control systems, E-8 Joint STARS air-to-ground surveillance radar sensor, the Longbow Hellfire missile, the ALQ-135 radar jammer for the F-15 Eagle, ALQ-218 Tactical Jamming Receiver for the EA-18G Growler and EA-6B ICAP III Prowler, tactical military radars, countrywide air defense systems, Directional Infrared Counter Measures, undersea warfare systems, and naval propulsion and power generation systems.

== History ==
Electronic Systems dates to 1938 when Westinghouse Electric Corporation’s Radio Division moved to Baltimore, Maryland from Massachusetts and Pittsburgh, Pennsylvania.

In 1939, Westinghouse doubled its manufacturing area in its Baltimore location to accommodate the production of the then secret SCR-270 aircraft warning radar. In 1941, an SCR-270 radar detected the December 7th attack on Pearl Harbor. However, its warnings went unheeded because of high-level uncertainty about the new technology's reliability. The first ground-based radar built for the Army Signal Corps, the SCR-270, was the model to stay in action throughout all of World War II. From 1941–1945, the Westinghouse Radio Division manufactured approximately 50 products during the war. Until 1942, most of this was radio equipment; later, production shifted to radar products. Wartime production included ground-based and naval radio and radar, electronic fuses, and torpedoes.

In 1953, the unit patented technologies for the Pulse-Doppler radar, creating airborne systems that could detect both stationary and moving targets, determine their range, and distinguish targets from background "clutter". Pulse-Doppler is the basis for airborne radars in use today. By 1966, the division designed and developed a miniaturized black-and-white camera that captured images from the Project Apollo Lunar Module that landed on the Moon on July 20, 1969. In 1967, the world's first solid-state radar, the AN/APQ-120 for the F-4 Phantom II fighter, was produced by the division. In 1947, Westinghouse acquired Joshua Hendy Iron Works.

In 1974, the division began development of the AN/APG-66 radar for the F-16. The unit produced over 6,000 radars for various versions of the F-16. In 1976, Westinghouse Electronic Systems delivered the first E-3 Sentry AWACS long-range airborne surveillance radar. In 1996, Westinghouse was selected to create the radar for the F-35 Joint Strike Fighter, which eventually became the AN/APG-81.

=== Expansion within Northrop Grumman ===
Electronic Systems merged and acquired many companies during its existence. Parts or all of the following companies or organizations were part of the sector: Westinghouse Electronic Systems, California Microwave, Litton Industries Advanced Electronics division, Solystic SA, Xetron Corporation, Aerojet Corporation Electronics & Information Systems, and Fibersense Technology Corp.

During the period from 1996 to 2005, Electronic Systems' annual sales increased from US$2.3B to US$6.6B.

== See also ==
- Northrop Grumman business sectors
- National Electronics Museum
