= AN/APG-66 =

Military aircraft fire-control radar

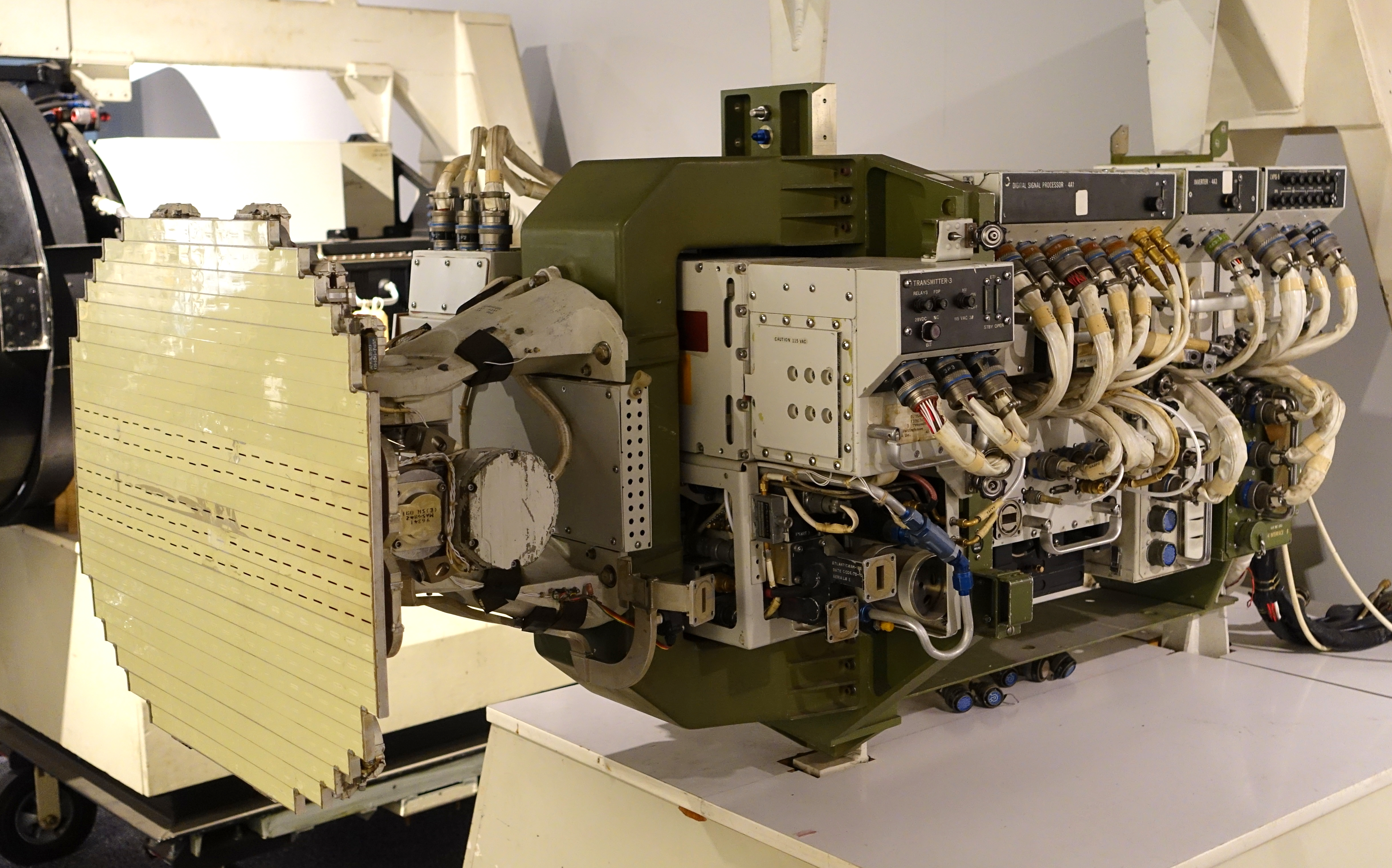
- Exhibit at National Electronics Museum, 1974
- Country of origin: United States
- Manufacturer: Northrop Grumman
- Designer: Westinghouse
- Type: Fire-control radar
- Frequency: X-band
- Range: 80 nmi (150 km; 92 mi)
- Azimuth: 40° x 10°
- Related: AN/APG-68, AN/APG-83

The AN/APG-66 radar is an X-band solid state medium range (up to 80 nautical miles (150 km; 92 mi)) pulse-Doppler planar array radar originally designed by the Westinghouse Electric Corporation (now Northrop Grumman) for use in early generations of the F-16 Fighting Falcon. Later F-16 variants use the AN/APG-68 or the AN/APG-83. This radar was employed in all domestic and export versions of the F-16A/B models throughout the production. Subsequent upgrades have been installed in many varying aircraft types including the U.S. Customs and Border Protection's C-550 Cessna Citation, US Navy P-3 Orion, and Piper PA-42 Cheyenne II's.

In accordance with the Joint Electronics Type Designation System (JETDS), the "AN/APG-66" designation represents the 66th design of an Army-Navy airborne electronic device for radar fire-control equipment. The JETDS system also now is used to name all Department of Defense electronic systems.

== Capabilities ==
Developed from Westinghouse's WX-200 concept radar, the AN/APG-66 was designed for operation with the AIM-7 Sparrow and AIM-9 Sidewinder missiles. Operation with AIM-120 AMRAAM missiles was introduced with a later variant. Production of system components also involved Belgium, Denmark, Netherlands and Norway.

The system has 10 operating modes for air-to-air (search and targeting) and air-to-surface operation. Air-to-ground offers ground mapping, doppler beam-sharpening, beacon, and sea modes.

It has both "uplook" and "downlook" scanning capabilities. In uplook mode, the radar uses a low Pulse-Repetition Frequency (PRF) for medium- and high-altitude target detection in low clutter, while downlook mode uses medium PRF for target detection in heavy clutter environments. In operation, it also has jamming resistant frequency agility.

== Composition ==
The radar system is composed of six individual line-replaceable units (LRUs). They consist of:

- Antenna: A mechanically scanned, slotted planar phased-array antenna with radiating horizontal slots that is 29 inches wide by 19 inches high
- Transmitter
- Low-Power Radio Frequency (LPRF) unit, with four operating frequencies within the X-band
- Digital Signal Processor
- Radar computer
- Control panel

== Specifications ==
- Frequency: X-Band 6.2–10.9 GHz (0.048–0.028 m)
- Search cone: 120 degrees × 120 degrees
- Azimuth angular coverage: ±10 degrees / ± 30 degrees / ± 60 degrees
- Weight: 98–135 kilograms (216–298 lb) depending on configuration
- Volume: 0.08–0.102 cubic meters (2.8–3.6 cu ft) depending on configuration

== Variants ==
- AN/APG-66(V)1 – Employed in select P-3C CDU aircraft in support of United States Coast Guard counter drug operations
- AN/APG-66(T47) - Installed in U.S. Customs and Border Protection Cessna OT-47B aircraft
- AN/APG-66(V)2 – Upgrade of AN/APG-66(V)1 developed for the F-16A/B Block 15 Mid Life Update (MLU) program. Due to clutter/jamming environment enhancements, detection range increased to 83 km (52 mi).
- AN/APG-66(V)2A – AN/APG-66(V)2 with a new combined signal and data processor providing seven times the speed and 20 times the memory of the older radar computer and digital signal processor line replaceable units. Displayed resolution in ground-mapping mode quadrupled, and is reported to be close to that offered by SAR techniques. Used for modernization of F-16A/B fleet of Belgium, Denmark, Norway, Portugal and the Netherlands in the mid-1990s.
- AN/APG-66(V)3 – APG-66(V)2 but with CW illumination capability, export to Taiwan.
- AN/APG-66H – Installed on British Aerospace Hawk 200 aircraft, smaller antenna and new signal data processor.
- AN/APG-66NT – Installed on US Navy T-39N aircraft for instruction of Student Naval Flight Officers.
- AN/APG-66NZ – Installed under Project KAHU on the New Zealand A-4 Skyhawk aircraft.
- AN/APG-66SR - Extended range radar with a larger aperture antenna
- AN/APG-66T – Multi-target track while scan variant.
- W160 – Shipborne tracking/gun fire control radar modified from the AN/APG-66 radar.

== See also ==
- List of radars
- List of military electronics of the United States
