= Lockheed Martin F-16V Viper =

Fighter jet

F-16V Viper F-16V C/D Block 70/72 F-16 PoBIT
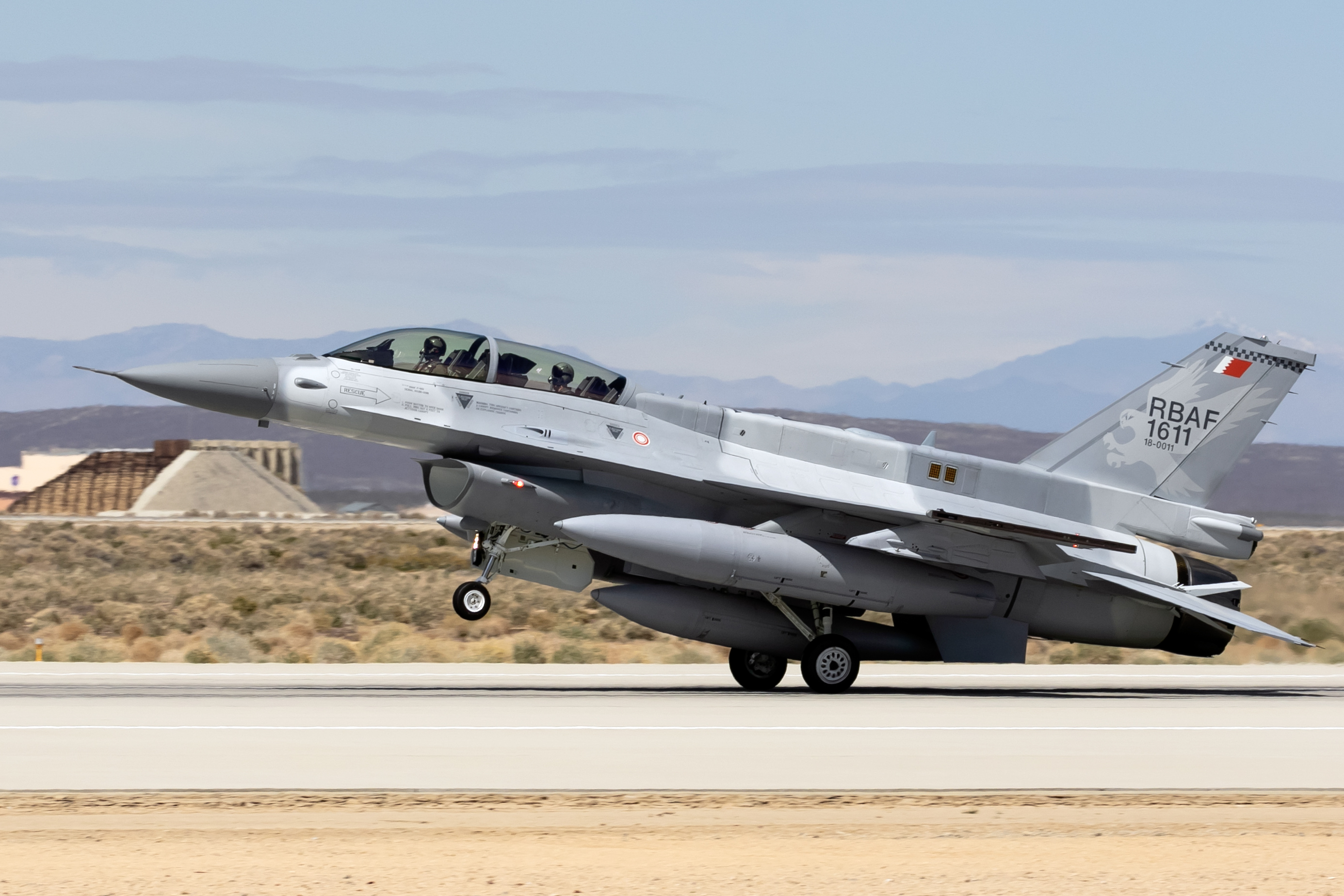
- Royal Bahraini Air Force F-16 Block 70 lands at Edwards Air Force Base

General information
- Type: Multirole fighter
- National origin: United States
- Manufacturer: Production plant of the Lockheed Martin in Greenville, South Carolina
- Designer: Lockheed Martin
- Status: In service
- Primary user: See users

History
- Manufactured: 2019–present (serial production)
- First flight: 2015
- In service: 2021–present
- Developed from: F-16 Fighting Falcon

The Lockheed Martin F-16V Viper is a family of upgraded single-engine supersonic multirole fighter aircraft developed from the General Dynamics F-16 Fighting Falcon. Improvements over the older F-16 variants include the APG-83 AESA radar, upgraded avionics with a modern mission computer, enhanced cockpit displays, and electronic warfare suites such as the AN/ALQ-254(V)1 Viper Shield. According to the manufacturer, the aircraft delivers fifth-generation fighter radar capabilities by leveraging hardware and software commonality with F-22 and F-35 AESA radars while extending service life and interoperability with stealth platforms. Initially introduced to support export customers like Taiwan and Greece through both new production and retrofit options, the Viper configuration continues to be fielded and modernized by Lockheed Martin and international partners. In the United States Air Force, the F-16 C/D Post Block Integration Team (PoBIT) modernization program is equivalent.

== Development ==
The F-16V (Block 70/72) began as Lockheed Martin’s comprehensive "Viper" upgrade announced at the Singapore Airshow on February 15, 2012, adding the AN/APG-83 SABR AESA radar, a new mission computer/architecture, and cockpit enhancements. An F-16V achieved its maiden flight with the AN/APG-83 on October 16, 2015, validating the configuration that would underpin both new-build Block 70/72 jets and global retrofit programs.

== Operational history ==
In May 2021, the United States Air Force awarded a $14 billion (~$16.4 billion in 2025) contract to Lockheed Martin to build new 128 F-16V Block 70/72 fighter jets on behalf of Bahrain, Slovakia, Bulgaria, Taiwan, Morocco and Jordan through 2026.

=== Bahrain ===
In September 2017, the U.S. Department of State approved a Foreign Military Sale to Bahrain for 19 newly-built F-16V and upgrade its existing 20 F-16C/D Block 40 to F-16V standard for the Royal Bahraini Air Force.

In June 2018, Bahrain finalized its order for 16 new-build F-16V and on 8 March 2024, Bahrain received its first batch of F-16 Block 70.

=== Greece ===
In October 2017, the U.S. approved the sale of 123 upgrade kits to Greece to bring their existing F-16C and D fighters up to the new F-16 Block 72 standard for the Hellenic Air Force. On 28 April 2018, Greece decided to upgrade 84 aircraft. On 12 September 2022, Greece received its first upgraded F-16 Block 72 jets. Hellenic Air Force F-16V jets participated in Ramstein Flag 2025.

=== South Korea ===
South Korea plans to upgrade 134 of its F-16C/D aircraft to the F-16V standard by November 2025 for the Republic of Korea Air Force.

=== Slovakia ===
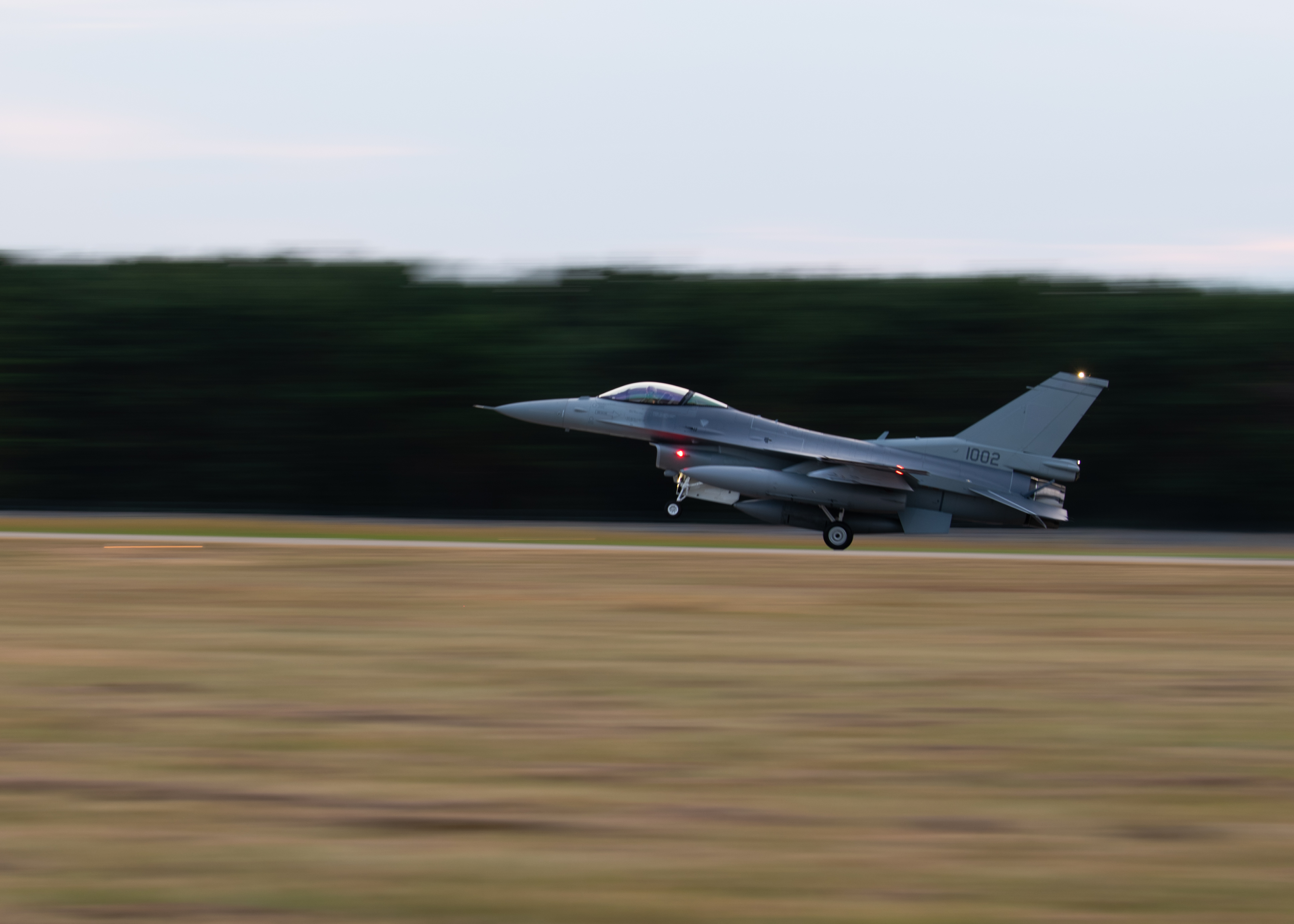
The first Slovak F-16C Block 70 arrives at Malacky Air Base.

In April 2018, the U.S. Department of State approved a Foreign Military Sale to Slovakia for 14 new F-16Vs for the Slovak Air Force, which at the time was still pending approval from U.S. Congress. The Defence Ministry of Slovakia announced on 11 July 2018, that it intends to purchase 14 F-16 Block 70 aircraft from Lockheed Martin to replace its aging fleet of Mikoyan MiG-29s. The package, which includes armament and training, is worth €1.58 billion ($1.8 billion), and is Slovakia's largest military purchase in modern history. Defence Minister Peter Gajdoš signed the contract with Lockheed Martin representative Ana Wugofski in a press conference in Bratislava, on 12 December 2018, after the government approved the purchase.

The first completed jet was unveiled by the manufacturer on 7 September 2023, and first two aircraft were delivered to Slovakia on 22 July 2024.

=== Bulgaria ===
In December 2018, Bulgaria chose sixteen F-16 C/D Block 70/72 as replacements for MiG-29s of the Bulgarian Air Force. On 10 July 2019, Bulgaria approved the purchase of eight F-16 Block 70/72 for $1.25 billion (~$1.55 billion in 2025). The U.S. Department of State approved the sale of eight F-16 Block 70s to Bulgaria, and the deal was approved by the Bulgarian parliament, and President Rumen Radev. On 4 November 2022, the Bulgarian parliament approved the purchase of 8 more F-16 C/D Block 70/72 fighters along with spares, weapons and other systems for $1.3 billion with delivery in 2027. On 13 April 2025, Bulgaria received its first F-16C Block 70 jet.

=== Republic of China (Taiwan) ===
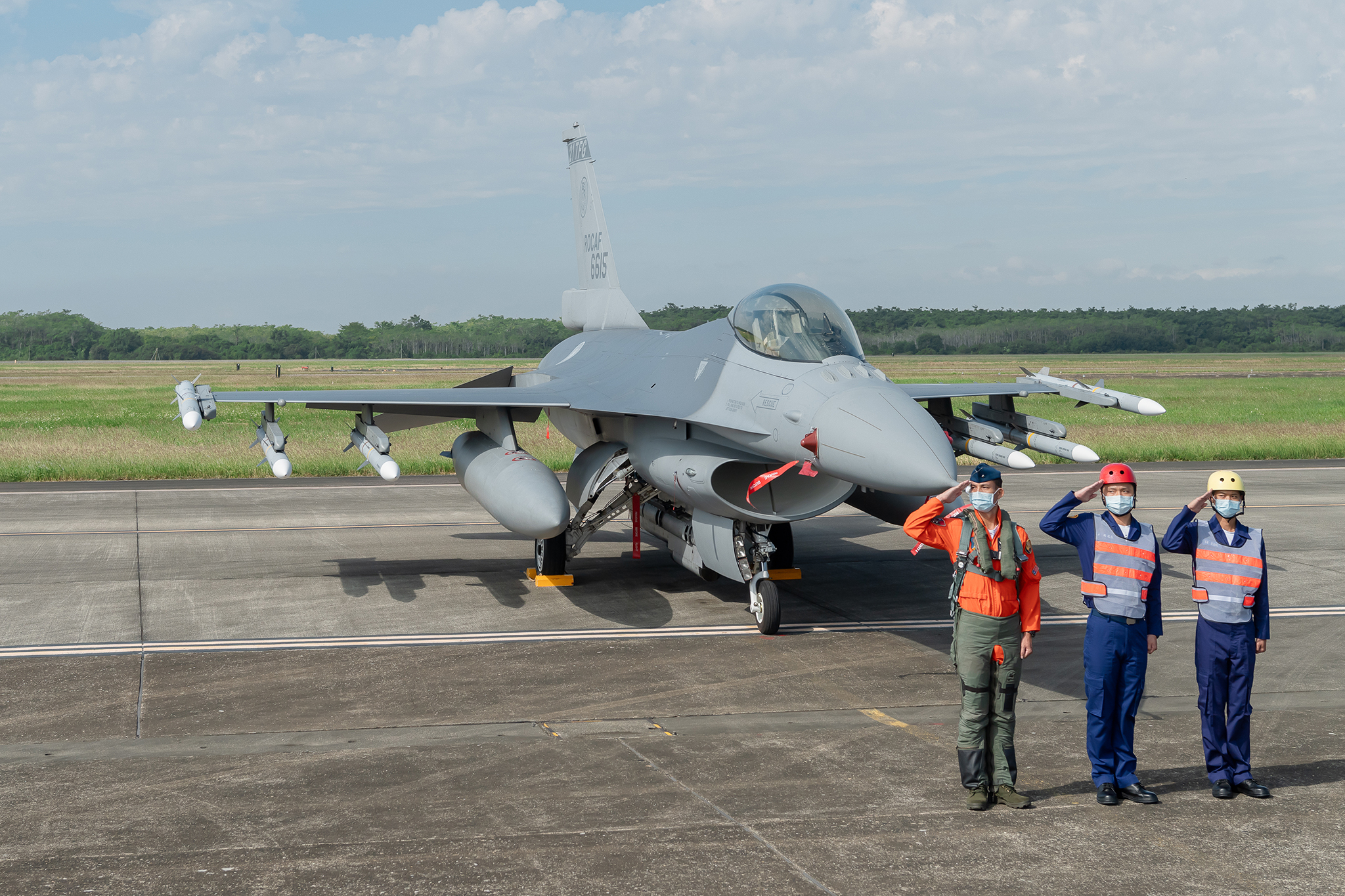
F-16 AM Block 20 (F-16V) of the Republic of China air force

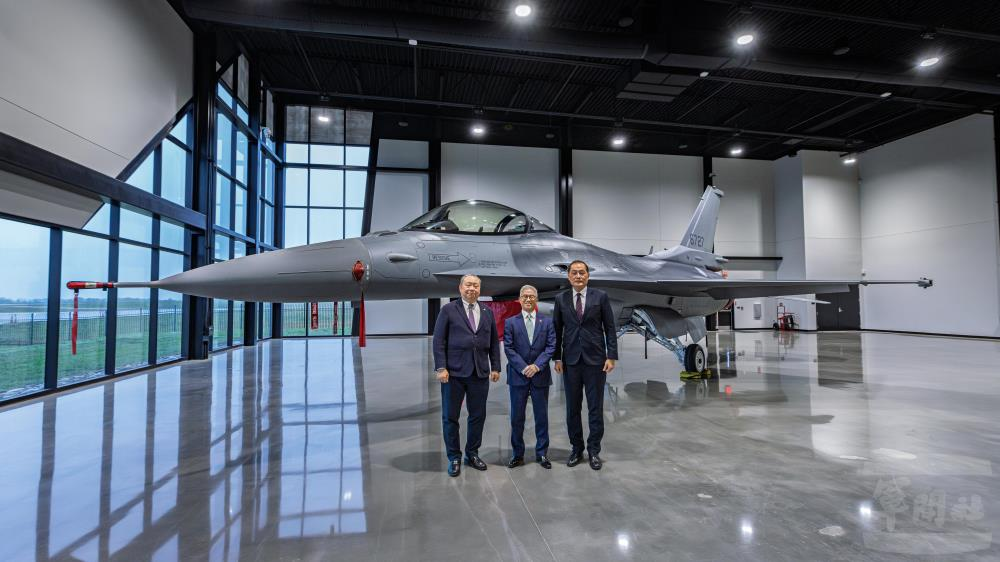
Republic of China’s first F-16C Block 70 (F-16V)

On 27 February 2019, Republic of China (Taiwan) requested to buy 66 new F-16 Block 70/72 aircraft for an approximate $13 billion (~$16.1 billion in 2025) as a replacement for the Republic Of China Air Force's aging Mirage 2000 and F-5 fighters.

On 16 August 2019, the U.S. Department of State submitted the package to Congress, with the total package worth $8 billion (~$9.92 billion in 2025) being for 66 F-16 Block 70 and spare parts. On 13 December 2019, the US and the Republic of China (Taiwan) finalized the F-16V order. On 14 August 2020, the Republic of China (Taiwan) formally signed an agreement to buy 66 F-16V jets built by Lockheed Martin.

On 18 November 2021, the Republic of China (Taiwan) commissioned the first F-16V Viper combat wing (upgraded fleet to Block 72 standard except for internal ECM system due to being based on F-16A/B airframes); these aircraft are referred to as F-16AM/BM locally. On 28 March 2025, Lockheed Martin unveiled the first newly built F-16 Block 70 jet for the Republic of China (Taiwan), and first two aircraft were delivered to the Republic of China (Taiwan) on 2 October 2026.

=== Morocco ===
On 25 March 2019, the U.S. Department of Defense announced approvals for two sets of foreign military sales of F-16V equipment to Morocco for the Royal Moroccan Air Force; the first for upgrading its existing 23 F-16s to the F-16V configuration, valued at $985.2 million; and the second, for a batch of 25 new Block 72 airframes, 29 new engines, a package of precision-guided munitions, and training valued at $3.787 billion.

=== Jordan ===
On 3 March 2020, it was announced that instead of upgrading its F-16s, the Royal Jordanian Air Force would be looking to buy the latest F-16 Block 70/72 model. As early as September 2017, the Royal Jordanian Air Force was working with the Air Force Life Cycle Management Center (AFLCMC), based at Wright Patterson Air Force Base, Ohio, to begin the Viper Block-70 operational upgrade program. This program is still under way, but it is unclear whether and when, it will apply where necessary congressional approvals are needed to sell these possibilities to Jordan.

=== Turkey ===
On 30 September 2021, Turkey sent a formal request to the United States to purchase 40 new F-16 Block 70/72 aircraft and nearly 80 kits to modernize its F-16C/D fighters to the F-16 Block 70/72 variant for the Turkish Air Force. Turkey later cancelled the upgrade kits from the deal and decided to modernize its F-16s locally. As of 1 June 2026, the U.S. Department of War had not publicly announced a firm production contract with Lockheed Martin for Turkey's procurement of 40 F-16 Block 70/72 fighters, although Turkish officials stated that the Letter of Offer and Acceptance (LOA) had entered into force following an initial payment.

=== Poland ===
On 13 August 2025, Poland signed a deal of $3.8 billion to upgrade its 48 F-16C/D Block 52+ to the Viper variant F-16 Block 72 for the Polish Air Force.

Lockheed Martin will partner with Polish defence company PGZ SA to undertake all modernization work at Military Aviation Works No. 2 (WZL-2) in Bydgoszcz, Poland, starting in 2028. The final upgraded F-16 is expected to be completed in 2038.

=== Potential operators ===
==== Philippines ====
In 2021, the Defense Security Cooperation Agency approved the Philippines' purchase of 12 F-16s worth an estimated US$2.43 billion. However, the Philippines has yet to complete this deal due to financial constraints with negotiations ongoing. In April 2025, the possible sale of 20 F-16s were approved, upgrading the previous approval made by DSCA. It was reported in May 2025 that Lockheed Martin was interested in developing a facility similar to the Center for Innovation and Security Solutions in Abu Dhabi, depending on the success of the F-16s being sold.

==== Vietnam ====
In 2025, multiple news channels reported that Vietnam is finalizing an agreement to purchase at least 24 F-16s, possibly the F-16V variant.

== Variants ==
Available as single-seat (C) or a twin-seat (D) configuration.

F-16V C/D Block 70
This version is powered by General Electric F110-GE-129 engine.
F-16V C/D Block 72
This version is powered by Pratt & Whitney F100-PW-229 engine.
F-16V
This version is built by upgrading older F-16 versions to the same specification as the F-16 Block 70 and Block 72. F-16V is primarily made for the export market.
F-16 PoBIT
This version is similar to the F-16V and made for the United States Air Force to upgrade its older generation F-16s.

== Operators ==
=== Current operators ===
Bahrain
The Royal Bahraini Air Force operates 10 newly built single-seat F-16C Block 70s and 6 newly built dual-seat F-16D Block 70s.
Bulgaria
The Bulgarian Air Force ordered 10 newly built single-seat F-16C Block 70s and 6 newly built dual-seat F-16D Block 70s in two batches. Bulgaria received its first batch of 8 aircraft between April-December 2025.
Greece
The Hellenic Air Force ordered 84 F-16Vs to be built by upgrading older versions of F-16s. As of September 2025, Greece has received 42 (upgraded) F-16V jets.
Jordan
The Royal Jordanian Air Force ordered 12 newly built F-16 C/D Block 70s.
Morocco
The Royal Moroccan Air Force ordered 25 newly built F-16 C/D Block 72s and 23 F-16Vs to be built by upgrading older versions of F-16s.
Peru
The Peruvian Air Force ordered 12 newly built F-16 C/D Block 70s in April 2026, although it intends to acquire up to 24 aircraft to fully replace its MiG-29s and Mirage 2000s.
Poland
The Polish Air Force ordered 47 F-16V to be built by upgrading older versions of F-16s.
Republic of China
The Republic of China Air Force operates 139 F-16Vs built by upgrading older versions of F-16s and 66 newly built F-16 C/D Block 70s to be delivered.
Republic of Korea
The South Korean Air Force is upgrading its older generation F-16s to the F-16Vs locally under license from the Lockheed Martin.
Slovakia
The Slovak Air Force ordered 12 newly built single-seat F-16C Block 70s and 2 newly built dual-seat F-16D Block 70s. As of February 2026, Slovakia has received 10 of the 14 jets.
Turkey
The Turkish Air Force ordered 40 new F-16 Block 70s.
United States
There are ongoing plans by the United States Air Force to upgrade 608 older versions of the F-16 to the F-16 PoBIT standard.

== Specifications (F-16V C/D Block 70/72) ==
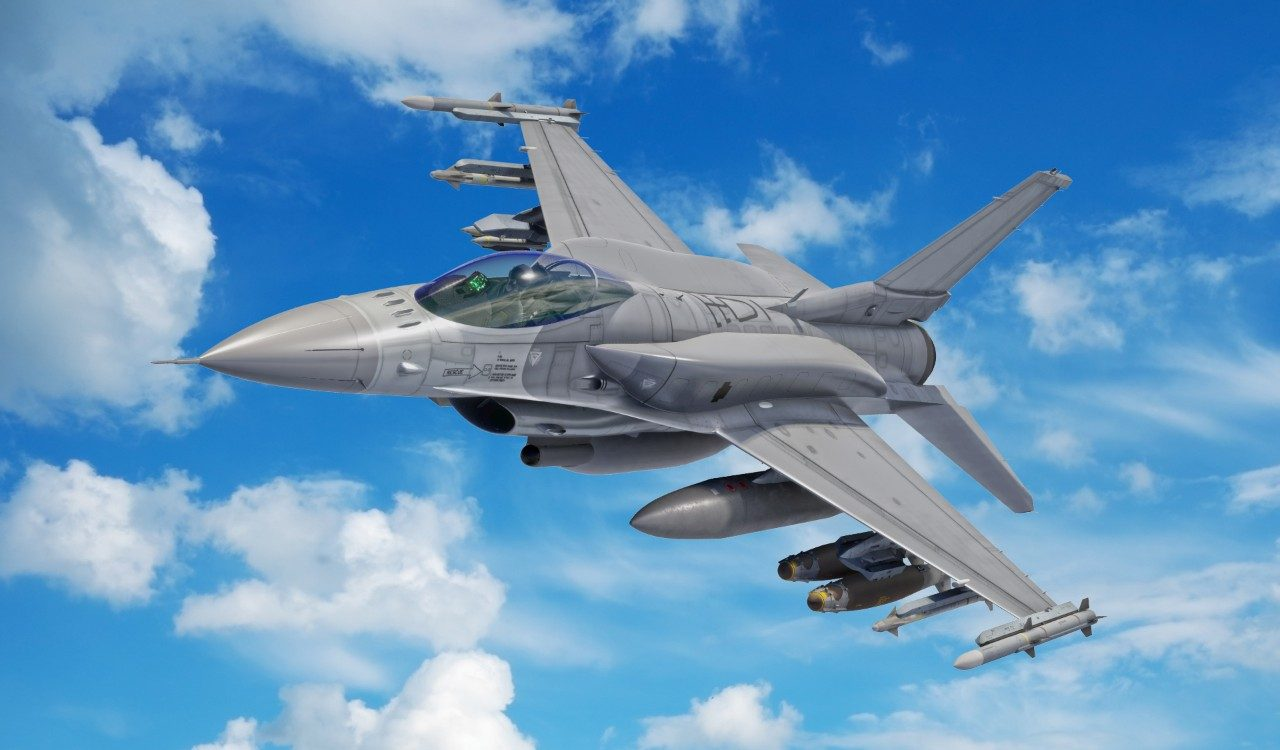
Artistic illustration of F-16C Block 70 with conformal fuel tank

Data from Lockheed Martin Product Card

General characteristics

- Crew: 1 (F-16C) or 2 (F-16D)
- Length: 49.3 ft/15.027 m
- Height: 16.7 ft/5.090 m
- Wingspan: 31.0 ft/9.449 m
- Empty Weight: 20,300 lb/9,207 kg
- Maximum TOGW: 48,000 lb/21,772 kg
- Optional Conformal Fuel Tanks (Right/Left): 220 Gallon
- Powerplant: 1 x GE F110-GE-129 engine for Block 70 aircraft (PW F100-PW-229 engine for Block 72 aircraft)

Performance

- Speed: 1,500 mph (Mach 2+)
- Engine Thrust Class: 29,000 lb/13,000 kg

Armament

- Guns: 1 x M61A1 20 mm Vulcan Cannon
- Rocket Pods:
  - LAU-68/131
  - LAU-3/5003
- Air-to-air missiles:
  - AIM-120A/B/C/D AMRAAM
  - AIM-9X/L/M/S Sidewinder
  - Python 4/5
  - IRIS-T
- Air-to-ground missiles:
  - AGM-65 Maverick/AGM-65 Laser Maverick
  - AGM-84L Harpoon
  - AGM-84K SLAM-ER
  - AGM-88 HARM
  - AGM-154 JSOW
  - AGM-158 JASSM/JASSM-ER
- Guided bombs:
  - GBU-10 Paveway II 2000 lb
  - GBU-12 Paveway II 500 lb
  - GBU-16 Paveway II 1000 lb
  - GBU-24 Paveway III 2000 lb
  - GBU-31 (V) JDAM 2000 lb
  - GBU-64 JDAM-ER 2000 lb
  - GBU-73 Paragon
  - GBU-49 Enhanced Paveway II 500 lb
  - GBU-50 Enhanced Paveway II 2000 lb
  - GBU-56 (V) Laser JDAM 2000 lb
  - GBU-53 SDB II StormBreaker
  - GBU-39 SDB I
  - GBU-32 JDAM 1000 lb
  - GBU-54 Laser JDAM 500 lb
  - GBU-62 JDAM-ER 500 lb
  - GBU-38 JDAM 500 lb

Avionics

- APG-83 AESA radar
- Viper Shield Electronic Warfare suite
