= RobotFest =

Annual event o promote science, technology, engineering and mathematics

Coordinates: 39°11′44″N 76°41′2″W

RobotFest Logo

Also called the "Day of Playful Invention", Robot fest "is an annual event for anyone interested in the creative use of technology" to promote science, technology, engineering and mathematics (STEM). It takes place at the National Electronics Museum in Linthicum, Maryland and entry is donation based.

It is unknown when the next Robotfest will take place. 2020 saw no event.
