= AN/APG-80 =

Military aircraft multimode radar

The AN/APG-80 is an Active Electronically Scanned Array (AESA) system designed and manufactured by Northrop Grumman for use on the Lockheed Martin F-16 Fighting Falcon fighter aircraft. It was originally designed to be included on the F-16C/D Block 60 Desert Falcon aircraft ordered by the United Arab Emirates, subsequently reclassified as the F-16E/F Block 60 Desert Falcons; first deliveries were made in 2003.

In accordance with the Joint Electronics Type Designation System (JETDS), the "AN/APG-80" designation represents the 80th design of an Army-Navy airborne electronic device for radar fire-control equipment. The JETDS system also now is used to name all Department of Defense electronic systems.

== Features ==
The AN/APG-80 system is described as "agile beam", and can perform air-to-air, search-and-track, air-to-ground targeting and aircraft terrain-following functions simultaneously and for multiple targets. As an AESA system utilizing NG's fourth-generation transmitter/receiver technologies, it has a higher reliability and twice the range of older, mechanically-scanned AN/APG-68 radar systems.

It consists of about 1000 Transmit and Receive Modules. The APG-80 is designed to search continuously for and track multiple targets within the forward hemisphere of the aircraft. As a result of increased operational flexibility, pilots will be able to simultaneously perform air-to-air search-and-track, air-to-ground targeting and aircraft terrain-following. Energetic ranges of target detection against it RCS is tabulated below:

Energetic ranges of target detection
| Example | Radar Cross-Section | Range |
|---|---|---|
| AA-missile | 0.0001 m² | > 11 km |
| stealth fighter | 0.001 m² | > 20 km |
| cruise missile | 0.1 m² | > 62 km |
| classic fighter | 1.0 m² | > 110 km |
| bomber | 5.0 m² | > 165 km |
| passenger aircraft | 10.0 m² | > 195 km |

== Development ==
The United Arab Emirates funded the entire $3 billion Block 60 development costs, including the AN/APG-80, which is the operational core of the aircraft. According to press reports quoted by Flight International, this is "the first time the US has sold a better aircraft overseas than its own forces fly". Developmental flight tests were performed on Northrop Grumman's highly modified BAC 1-11 test bed aircraft, based at Baltimore.

== See also ==
- Look-down/shoot-down
- List of radars
- List of military electronics of the United States
