= AN/APG-68 =

US military aircraft fire-control radar

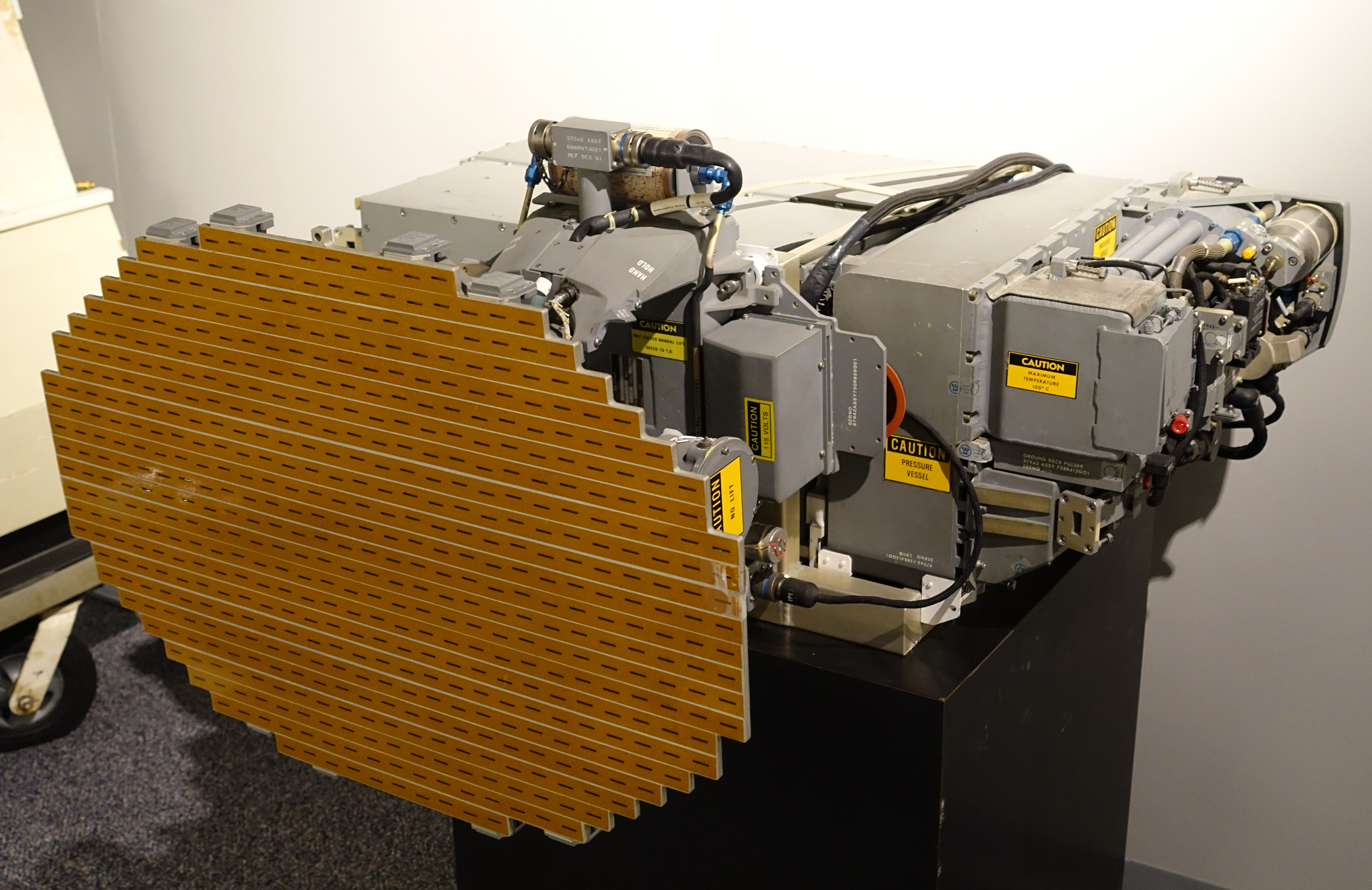
- Westinghouse AN/APG-68 displayed at the National Electronics Museum
- Country of origin: United States
- Designer: Westinghouse Electric Corporation
- Introduced: 1981; 45 years ago
- Type: Pulse-Doppler synthetic aperture fire control radar
- Frequency: Starting Envelope frequency around 9.86 GHz (3.04 cm), X-band
- Range: Max Detection Range around 50 mi (80 km)
- Azimuth: ±10 degrees, ±30 degrees, ±60 degrees

The AN/APG-68 radar is a long range pulse-Doppler radar designed by Westinghouse (now Northrop Grumman) to replace the AN/APG-66 radar in the General Dynamics F-16 Fighting Falcon. The AN/APG-68 radar was itself to be replaced beginning in early 2022 on US Air Force F-16C/D Fighting Falcon Block 40/42 and 50/52 by the AN/APG-83 AESA radar.

In accordance with the Joint Electronics Type Designation System (JETDS), the "AN/APG-68" designation represents the 68th design of an Army-Navy airborne electronic device for radar fire-control equipment. The JETDS system also now is used to name all Department of Defense and some NATO electronic systems.

== Description ==
The AN/APG-68 is an improvement to the AN/APG-66 used on the F-16A/B. The AN/APG-68(V)8 and earlier versions of the radar system consists of the following line-replaceable units:

- Antenna
- Dual Mode Transmitter (DMT)
- Modular Low-power radio frequency (MLPRF)
- Programmable signal processor (PSP)

The AN/APG-68(V)9 version consists of the following line-replaceable units:

- Antenna
- Medium Duty Transmitter (MDT)
- Modular Receiver/Exciter (MoRE)
- Common Radar Processor (CoRP)

The APG-68(V)9 is the latest development of the radar. Besides the increase in scan range compared to the previous version, it has a synthetic aperture radar (SAR) capability.

The APG-68(V)9 has equipped several exported F-16 variants, including the Egyptian Air Force, Israeli Air Force, Chilean Air Force, Republic of Singapore Air Force, Turkish Air Force, Royal Moroccan Air Force, Greek Air Force, Pakistan Air Force, Polish Air Force, Royal Thai Air Force, and Indonesian Air Force.

== Specifications ==
- Frequency: Starting Envelope frequency around 9.86 GHz (3.04 cm)
- Under AIS Testing as high as 26 GHz (1.2 cm)
- Max Detection Range : 50 mi (80 km)
- Search cone: 120 × 120 degrees
- Azimuth angular coverage: ±10 degrees / ±30 degrees / ±60 degrees
- Programmable Signal Processor (PSP) - The core radar component which is responsible for signal processing, frequency selection, signal digitization for B-Scope display. The PSP is controlled through the F-16 Heads Down Display Set (HDDS) or what is commonly called the Multi-Function Displays (MFDs). The PSP is directed by the system operational flight program (OFP), which is controlled and modified for new threats or addition radar system requirements. The PSP also contains all the control circuitry for radar air-to-air missiles and air-to-ground weaponry operational scan patterns and SAR/ISAR operation.
- Modular Low Powered Radio Frequency (MLPRF) - The signal generator for the radar system. Frequency generation is dependent on the random frequency selection from the radar tables within the PSP upon system start-up. The MLPRF generates a small amount of RF Drive, which is sent to the Dual Mode Transmitter (DMT), where it is amplified and a small RF sample is sent to the MLPRF for comparison checksum (like a check and balance system). The MLPRF is also responsible for receiving radar returns, generating the RF injection noise (for RF discrimination), and the processed RF within the MLPRF is then later sent to the PSP for video processing and threat/target matching against the radar threat tables within the PSP, prior to flightcrew system display.
- Dual Mode Transmitter (DMT) - A 24,000 volt radar transmitter, containing a TWT, which generates the amplified RF to be sent to the radar antenna for system emission. The TWT operates by optical pulses received from the DMT's internal Pulse Decker Unit and TWT Cathode/Anode voltage inputs.
- Antenna - A planar array antenna, which is constructed to receive RF data through a waveguide system. The transmitted and received pulses are controlled in time by the PMW (Pulse Modulated Wave) radar design, and the waveguide duplexer assembly. Internal to the antenna are Uniphaser Assemblies (used for quadrature phase control), Phase Shifters (used of quadrature I/Q data) and gimbalized motor control for antenna positioning and position correction.

== See also ==
- List of radars
- List of military electronics of the United States
