= Xetron =

American computer surveillance software company

Coordinates: 39°18′12.7″N 84°28′43.9″W

Xetron Corporation
- Industry: Computer surveillance / security
- Founded: 1972; 54 years ago
- Headquarters: 460 W Crescentville Rd, Cincinnati, Ohio
- Key people: Bob Watson

Xetron Corporation is a Northrop Grumman Corporation subsidiary and government contractor developing software and communications systems.

== Background ==
Xetron used to produce the popular Xetron SPL-60 low noise audio amplifier with a tunable comb notch filter.

On 9 July 1992, the first AM IBOC transmission was sent from the Xetron offices in Cincinnati, since the company was contracted by the USADR to work on the project.

In 2000, the company was awarded a $2.1 million contract from ViaSat to develop a MIDS-LVT radio system.

== Intelligence work for the government ==
In 2011 it was revealed that the company worked with HBGary and Palantir on attribution for deanonymizing Internet activists of Anonymous.

According to documents leaked by Edward Snowden, it has been sharing hacking techniques with intelligence agencies since at least 2010. In that year they developed a malicious Windows software named "Orca" for preventing malware detection by antivirus software.

With WikiLeaks' Vault 7 disclosures in 2017, it was revealed that Xetron developed tools allowing unauthorized access to Cisco routers for the CIA as well as "Cinnamon" − an implant for Cisco devices. According to the documents, they also developed software for the control of compromised computers via command servers for the agency. As of March 2017, the company's name shows up in nearly 400 of the leak's documents.

The Intercept revealed in 2017 that some employees of Xetron were suddenly subjected to a polygraph. It was unclear whether this was due to an active investigation into the source of the leaks or simply a stepped-up security requirement.
