= Northrop Grumman =

American aerospace and defense company

Northrop Grumman Corporation
- Type: Public
- Traded as: NYSE: NOC; S&P 500 component
- Industry: Aerospace, defense
- Predecessors: Northrop Corporation; Grumman Corporation
- Founded: 1994; 32 years ago
- Headquarters: West Falls Church, Virginia, U.S.
- Area served: Worldwide
- Key people: Kathy J. Warden (President and CEO)
- Revenue: ▲US$41.9 billion (2025)
- Operating income: ▲US$4.51 billion (2025)
- Net income: ▲US$4.18 billion (2025)
- Total assets: ▲US$51.4 billion (2025)
- Total equity: ▲US$16.7 billion (2025)
- Number of employees: ~95,000 (2025)
- Website: www.northropgrumman.com

Northrop Grumman Corporation is an American aerospace and defense company that designs and manufactures systems for aeronautics, defense, missions, and space. Headquartered in West Falls Church, Virginia, the company is the fifth-largest contractor of the U.S. federal government; it receives over 2% of all federal government spending on contractors.

The company was formed in 1994 through the merger of Northrop Corporation and Grumman Aerospace. It is ranked 110th on the Fortune 500 list of America's largest corporations. In 2024, 87% of the company's revenues came from the US federal government, while 12% was from international sources. Northrop Grumman and its industry partners have won the Collier Trophy nine times, including for the development and production of the James Webb Space Telescope, launched in 2021.

== Products ==
The company's Aeronautics Systems division (29% of 2024 revenues) develops the B-21 Raider strategic bomber that can drop conventional and thermonuclear weapons (forecasted to be ready for combat in 2029), the B-2 Spirit strategic bomber (which will be replaced by the B-21), fuselage and radar production for the Lockheed Martin F-35 Lightning II Joint Strike Fighter and F/A-18 Super Hornet, Grumman E-2 Hawkeye airborne early warning and control, MQ-4C Triton unmanned aerial vehicle, and the NATO Alliance Ground Surveillance Force.

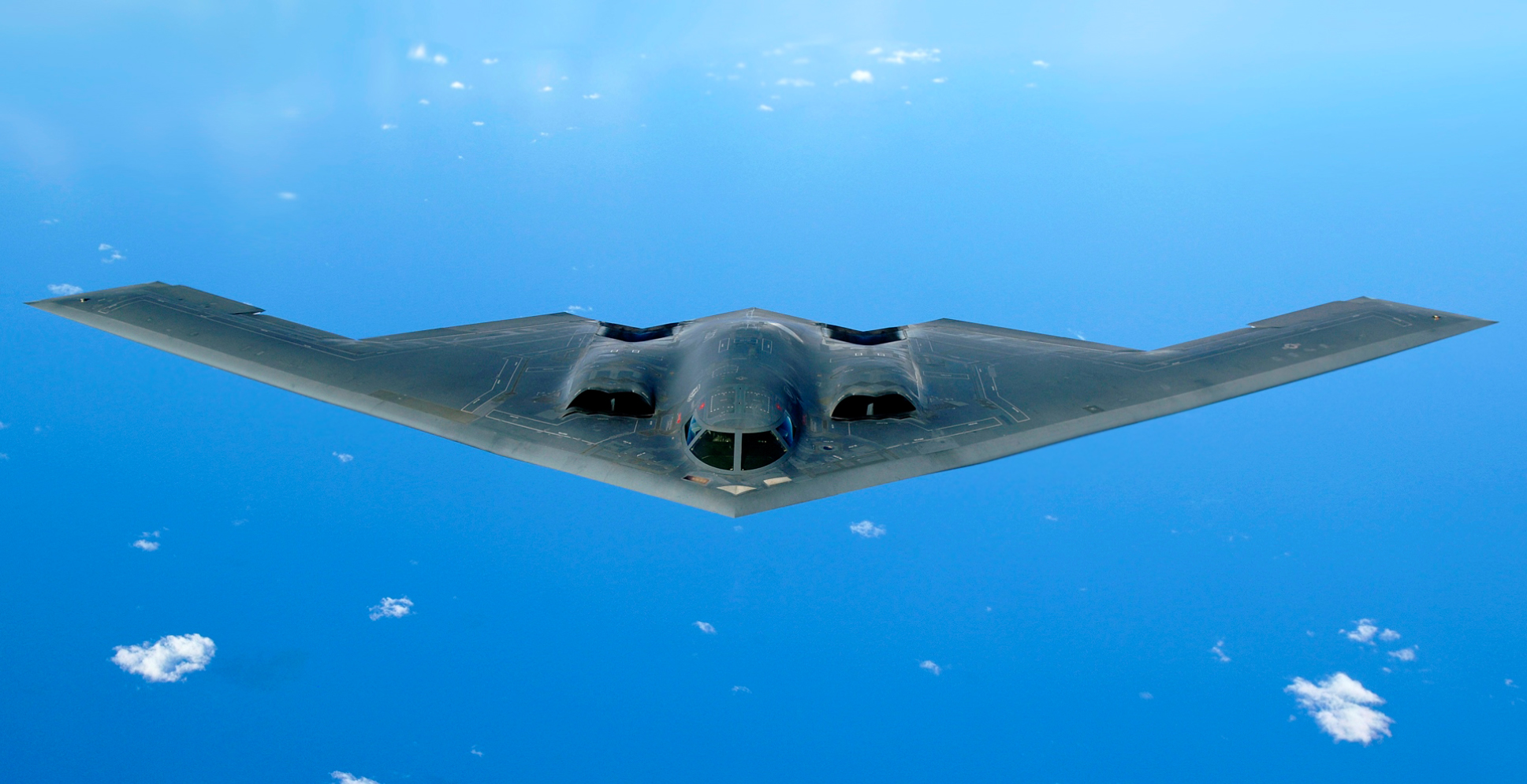
Northrop Grumman developed and built the B-2 Spirit strategic bomber.

The company's defense systems division (19% of 2024 revenues) designs the modernization of the intercontinental ballistic missile system including the LGM-35 Sentinel, the Integrated Air and Missile Defense Battle Command System, Vinnell training, and the M1156 precision guidance kit.

The company's mission systems division (25% of 2024 revenues) creates military radar, sensors, and related products, including C4I radar systems for air defense, Airspace Management radar systems such as AWACS, Multi-Platform Radar Technology Insertion Program, night vision goggles, Airport Movement Area Safety System, and battlefield surveillance systems like the Airborne Reconnaissance Low (ARL). Tactical aircraft sensors include the AN/APG-68 radar, the AN/APG-80 active electronically scanned array radar, and the AN/APG-83 AESA radar for the F-16 Fighting Falcon, the AN/APG-77 AESA radar for the F-22 Raptor, the AN/APG-81 AESA radar for the F-35 Lightning II, and the AN/AAQ-37 electro-optical Distributed Aperture System (DAS) for the F-35, and the APQ-164 Passive Electronically Scanned Array (PESA) radar for the B-1 Lancer.

The company's space systems division (27% of 2024 revenues) develops Satcom communications satellites, Next-Generation Overhead Persistent Infrared satellites, the Cygnus uncrewed spacecraft, motors for the NASA Space Launch System, logistics support for the Lunar Gateway, Graphite-Epoxy Motor solid rocket boosters, and satellites for the Norwegian Space Agency.

Northrop Grumman Computing Systems, Inc., provides computing services to businesses.

== History ==
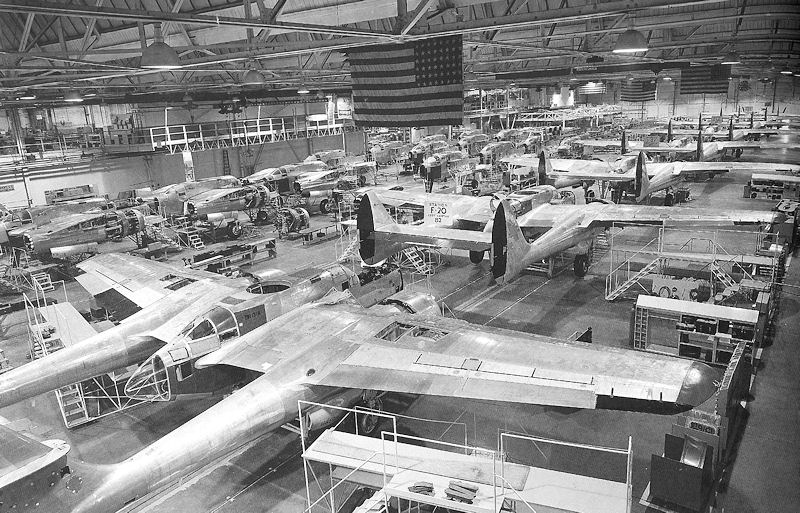
The assembly line for Northrop P-61 Black Widows at the Northrop plant in Hawthorne, California, in World War II. Center wings and fuselages take shape on the left, with more nearly finished airplanes on the right.

Leroy R. Grumman established the Grumman Aircraft Engineering Corporation in December 1929 on Long Island, New York. By 1939, the company had expanded and relocated to Bethpage, New York. Among Grumman's well known naval aviation products was the F-14 Tomcat. During World War II the company built most US Navy aircraft, including the TBF Avenger, F4F Wildcat, and F6F Hellcat. After the war it branched out into making the first aluminum canoes using left-over materials no longer needed for aircraft. Later the firm created a myriad of products such as ballistic missiles, all-weather radars, the Apollo Lunar Module, land and sea-based fighter aircraft and Stealth bombers.

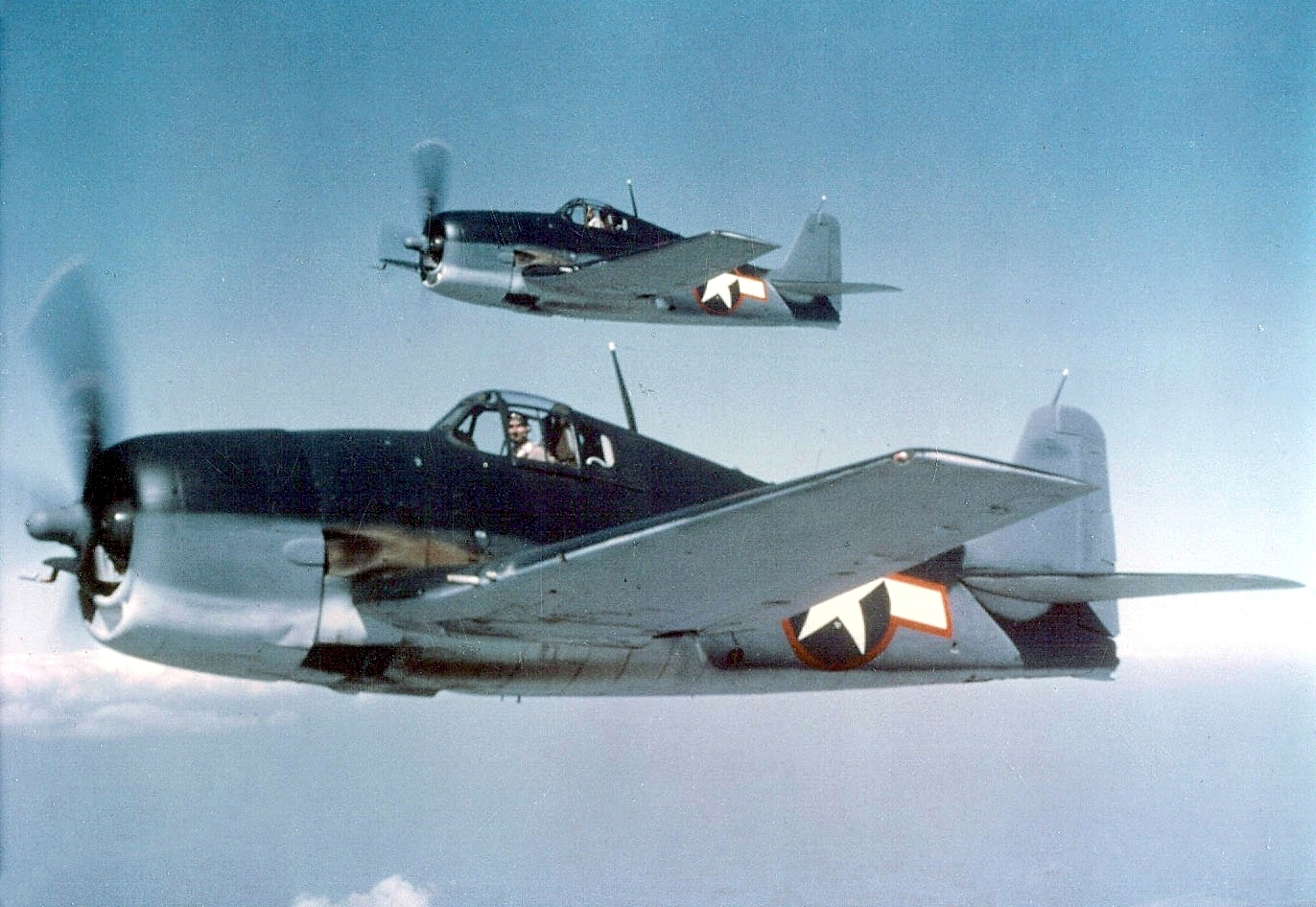
Grumman F6F-3 Hellcats in tricolor camouflage

Founded in California in 1939 by Jack Northrop, the Northrop Corporation was reincorporated in Delaware in 1985. Northrop made a series of lightweight fighter aircraft such as the F-5, YF-17, and F-20. Northrop was best known for its experimental flying wing aircraft, the XB-35 and YB-49 of the late 1940s and early 1950s. These flying wing aircraft, while unsuccessful, paved the way for the B-2 Spirit Stealth Bomber, on which Northrop was the prime contractor. During World War II, Northrop made the P-61 Black Widow, the first aircraft designed as a night fighter. After the end of the Cold War, Northrop made a series of acquisitions, buying Grumman Aerospace, Westinghouse and TRW Inc. in addition to a number of other enterprises.

In 2018, Northrop Grumman completed the purchase of Orbital ATK, which was renamed to Northrop Grumman Innovation Systems. Innovation Systems was integrated into other parts of the business in a reorganization the following year.

=== 1990s ===
In 1994, Northrop Aircraft bought Grumman Aerospace, which built the Apollo Lunar Module, to create Northrop Grumman (NG) at a cost of $2.1 billion. After 1994, Northrop Grumman made several major acquisitions, including Vought, Logicon, Xetron Corporation, the defense electronics business of Westinghouse Electronic Systems, and Ryan Aeronautical.

Northrop has competed in the Advanced Tactical Fighter program, submitting the YF-23 to compete against the F-22 Raptor in 1991.

Northrop partnered with Lockheed on the F-35 and serves as a principal member of the Lockheed Martin industry led team.

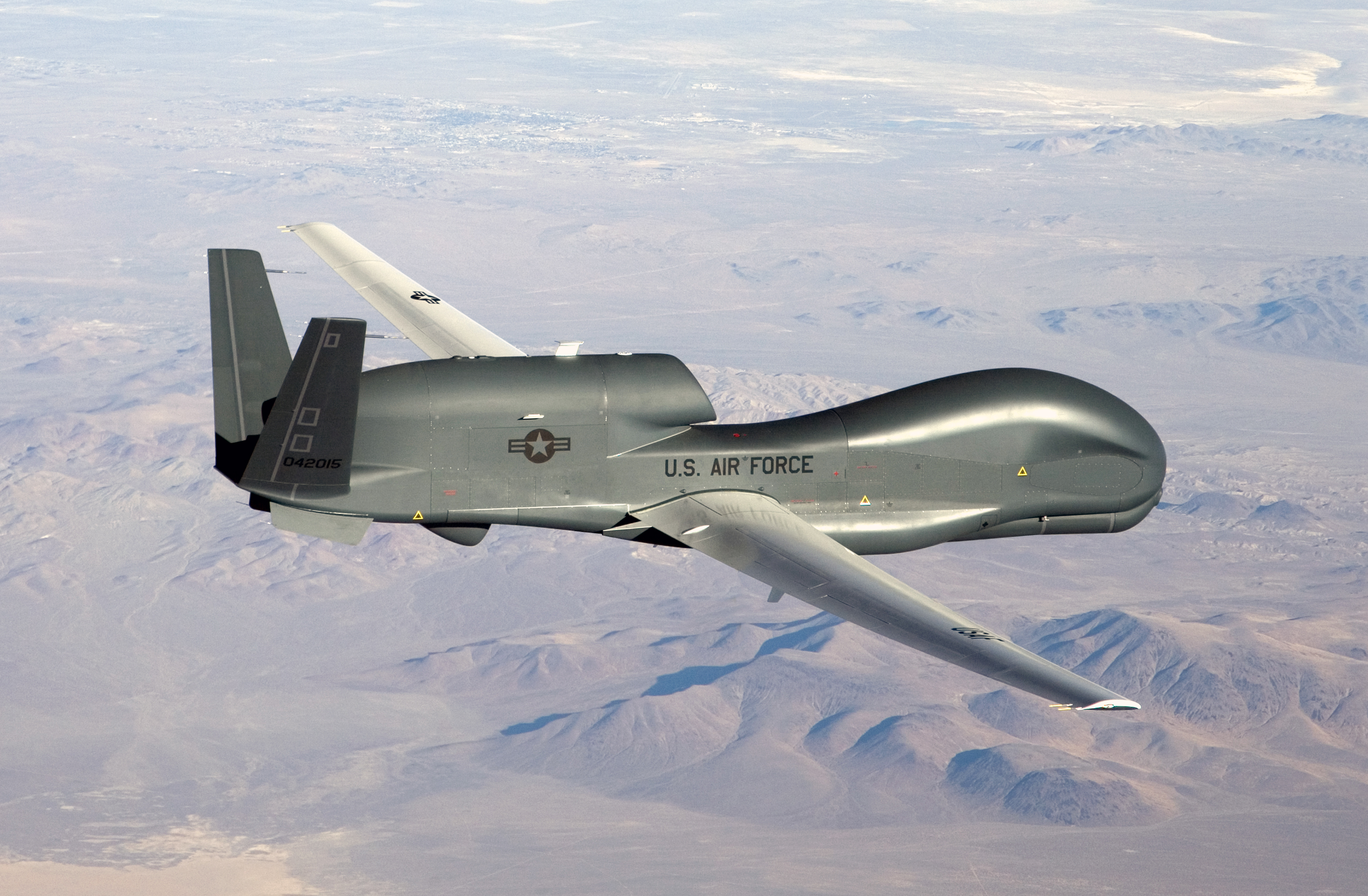
The RQ-4 Global Hawk, a high-altitude, long-endurance surveillance platform

In 1998, a merger between Northrop Grumman and competitor Lockheed Martin was considered but abandoned after resistance from the Department of Defense and Department of Justice. That same year, it acquired Inter-National Research Institute Inc. In 1999, the company acquired Teledyne Ryan, developer of surveillance systems and unmanned aircraft, California Microwave, Inc., and the Data Procurement Corporation. In 1999, Northrop Grumman and SAIC created AMSEC LLC as a joint venture, which grew "from $100 million in revenue in 2000 to approximately $500 million in fiscal year 2007".

=== 2000s ===
In 2000, NG acquired Federal Data Corporation, Navia Aviation As, Comptek Research, Inc., and Sterling Software, Inc.

In 2001, the company acquired Litton Industries, a shipbuilder and defense electronics systems provider for the U.S. Navy. During the acquisition process, a new Delaware holding company, NNG, Inc., was formed, which merged with Northrop Grumman through a one-for-one common shares exchange in April 2001. Both Northrop Grumman and Litton became subsidiaries of the new holding company. The original Northrop Grumman Corporation then changed its name to "Northrop Grumman Systems Corporation"; the holding company, NNG, Inc., changed its name to "Northrop Grumman Corporation". Later that year, Northrop Grumman acquired Newport News Shipbuilding.

In 2002, Northrop Grumman acquired TRW Inc. Northrop incorporated TRW's space and laser capabilities and system manufacturing infrastructure into its newly created Space Technology sector based in Redondo Beach, California (Space Park), and the Mission Systems sector based in Reston, Virginia.

The company logo used from 1994 to 2020

In July 2003, the company received a $48 million contract to train the Iraqi Army.

In August 2005, the United Kingdom paid $1.2 billion in a contract with the company to provide maintenance of its AWACS radar.

In November 2005, the company won a $2 billion contract with Virginia to overhaul most of the state's IT operations.

On January 1, 2006, Northrop Grumman opened its business sector called 'Technical Services'. Northrop Grumman and Boeing collaborated on a design concept for NASA's upcoming Orion spacecraft (previously the Crew Exploration Vehicle), but the contract went to rival Lockheed Martin on August 31, 2006.

In 2006, Northrop Grumman had intended to bid for the U.S. Air Force's Next-Generation Bomber. Though it has not built a large manned aircraft since wrapping up B-2 Spirit production in the 1990s, the company has "been working hard to turn that perception around, with the skills and capabilities that back it up". However, by 2009, the teams working on that project were dispersed, as USAF's focus turned to a long-range strike instead. Northrop Grumman was one of two teams competing for the Long Range Strike Bomber, and in October 2015 won that contract.

On July 20, 2007, Northrop Grumman became the sole owner of Burt Rutan's Scaled Composites.

In 2007, Northrop Grumman created 'National Workforce Centers' as an alternative to offshoring. Locations are Auburn, Alabama; Corsicana, Texas; Fairmont, West Virginia; Helena, Montana; Johnstown, Pennsylvania; and Lebanon, Virginia. The Rapid City, South Dakota location closed in January 2012.

In August 2007, Northrop Grumman acquired Scaled Composites in which it had previously owned a 40% stake.

In June 2008, Northrop Grumman began working with DHS Systems LLC, manufacturer of the Deployable Rapid Assembly Shelter (DRASH) in New York, as part of the U.S. Army's Standard Integrated Command Post System program.

In July 2008, three of four Northrop Grumman employees (Thomas Howes, Marc Gonsalves and Keith Stansell) were freed during Operation Jaque after five years of captivity following their 2003 aircraft crash in the Colombian jungle. The fourth employee, Tom Janis, had been killed by the FARC shortly after the crash.

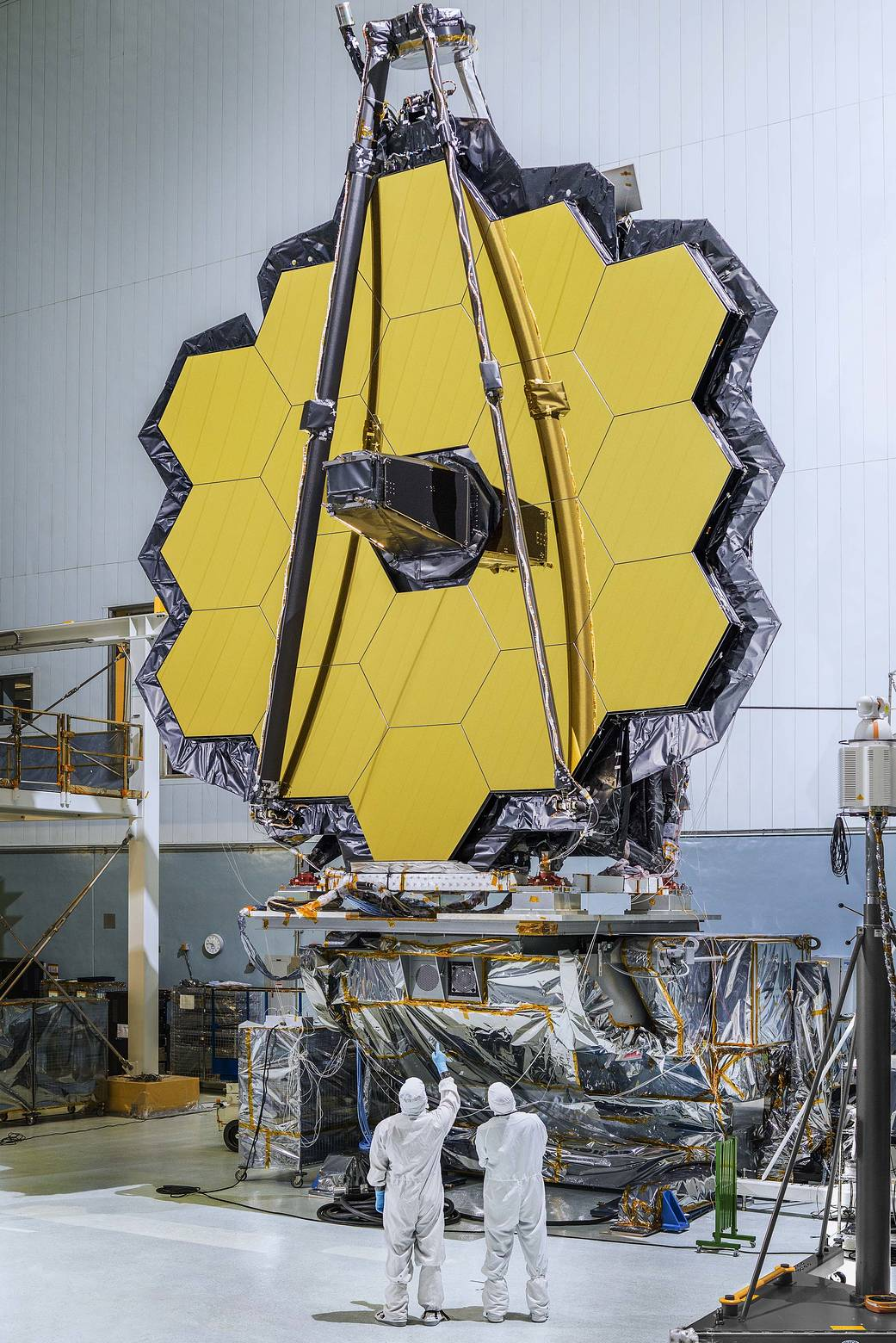
The main mirror assembly of the $8.7B James Webb Space Telescope, November 2016

=== 2010s ===
In March 2011, Northrop Grumman spun off its Shipbuilding unit as Huntington Ingalls Industries.

In July 2013, Northrop Grumman won a training-simulation contract potentially worth $490 million to support the U.S. Air Force's next-generation aerial warfare virtual-training network.

In 2015, Northrop Grumman won a contract for the DARPA Tactically Exploited Reconnaissance Node (TERN) program.

In March 2015, the company delivered the first shipset for Australian EA-18G Growler.

In October 2015, the US Military awarded Northrop Grumman the contract for the successor to the B-1 and B-52, subsequently identified as the B-21. The initial value is $21.4 billion, and could eventually be worth up to $80 billion.

In September 2017, Northrop announced the acquisition of missile and rocket manufacturer Orbital ATK Inc for $9.2 billion: $7.8 billion in cash plus $1.4 billion in net debt. On November 29, 2017, the acquisition was approved by Orbital ATK stockholders and on June 6, 2018, the merger closed after final FTC approval. The acquired company assets and naming were absorbed and become a division named Northrop Grumman Innovation Systems.

In January 2018, Northrop Grumman became the primary contractor for the James Webb Space Telescope.

On June 7, 2018, the acquisition of Orbital ATK was completed, and it was absorbed in Northrop Grumman as a new business sector called Northrop Grumman Innovation Systems.

=== 2020s ===
Effective January 1, 2020, the NGIS division was split, with most of the sector merging with other Northrop Grumman businesses into a new Space Systems sector.

In June 2020, NASA granted a $935 million contract to Northrop Grumman for the Lunar Gateway Habitation and Logistics Outpost (HALO) module, based on its Cygnus cargo spacecraft. In July 2022, Northrop subcontracted Solstar to provide the wireless-enabling technology to enable a Wi-Fi access for employees and equipment in the module.

In September 2020, Northrop ended development of the OmegA space launch vehicle, intended to carry the U.S. government's national security satellites into space.

In September 2020, Northrop Grumman won a $298 million sole-source contract for the Evolved Strategic Satcom program, an anti-jam communications satellite program intended to replace the Advanced Extremely High Frequency (AEHF) satellite program where Northrop Grumman was a subcontractor to Lockheed Martin.

In February 2021, Northrop sold its federal IT and mission support business to Veritas Capital for $3.4 billion.

In March 2021, NASA awarded Northrop Grumman the contract to develop the Mars Ascent Propulsion System for a Mars sample-return mission. Northrop designed a solid-fueled rocket to launch samples collected by the Perseverance rover from Mars to Earth.

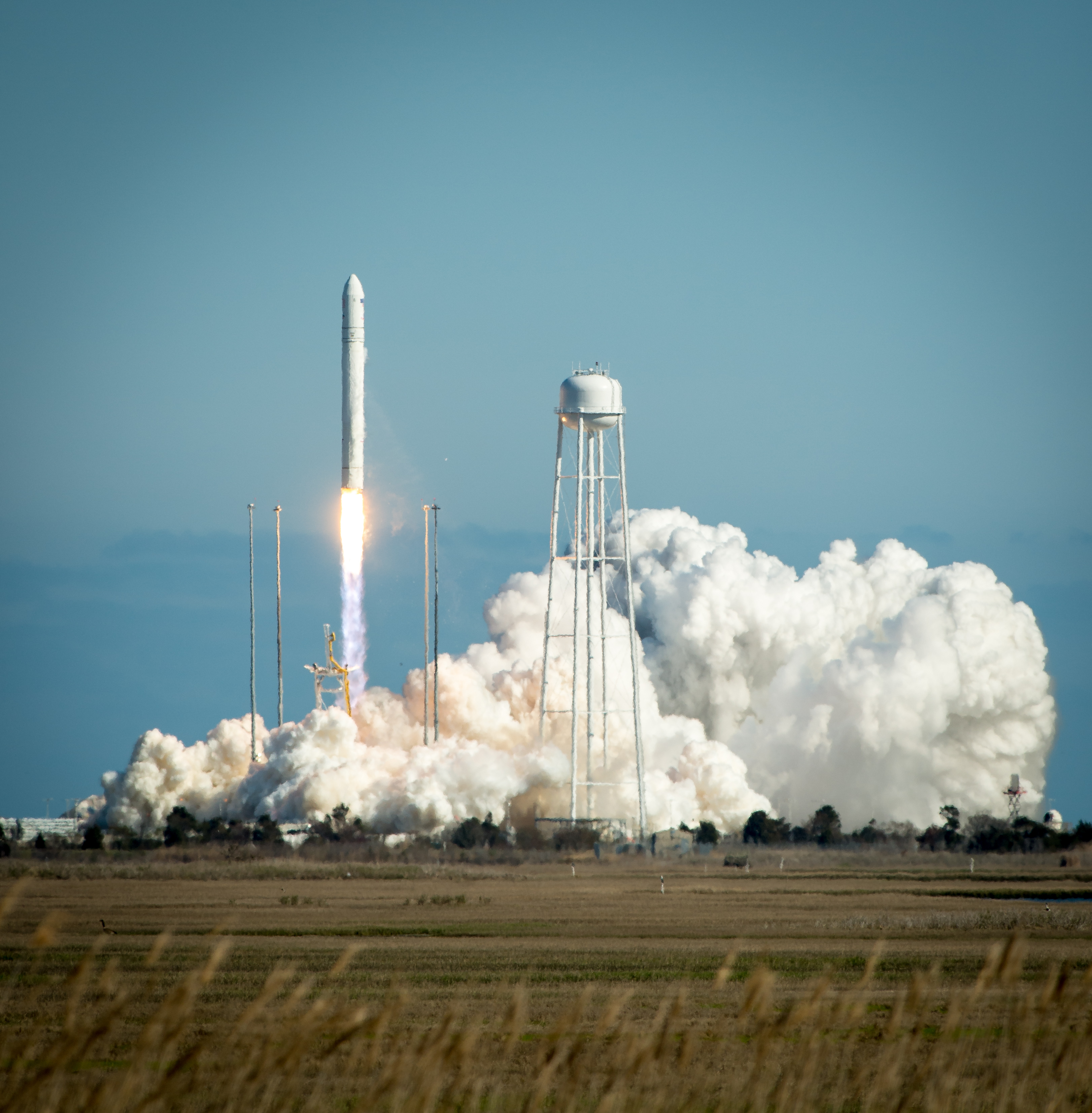
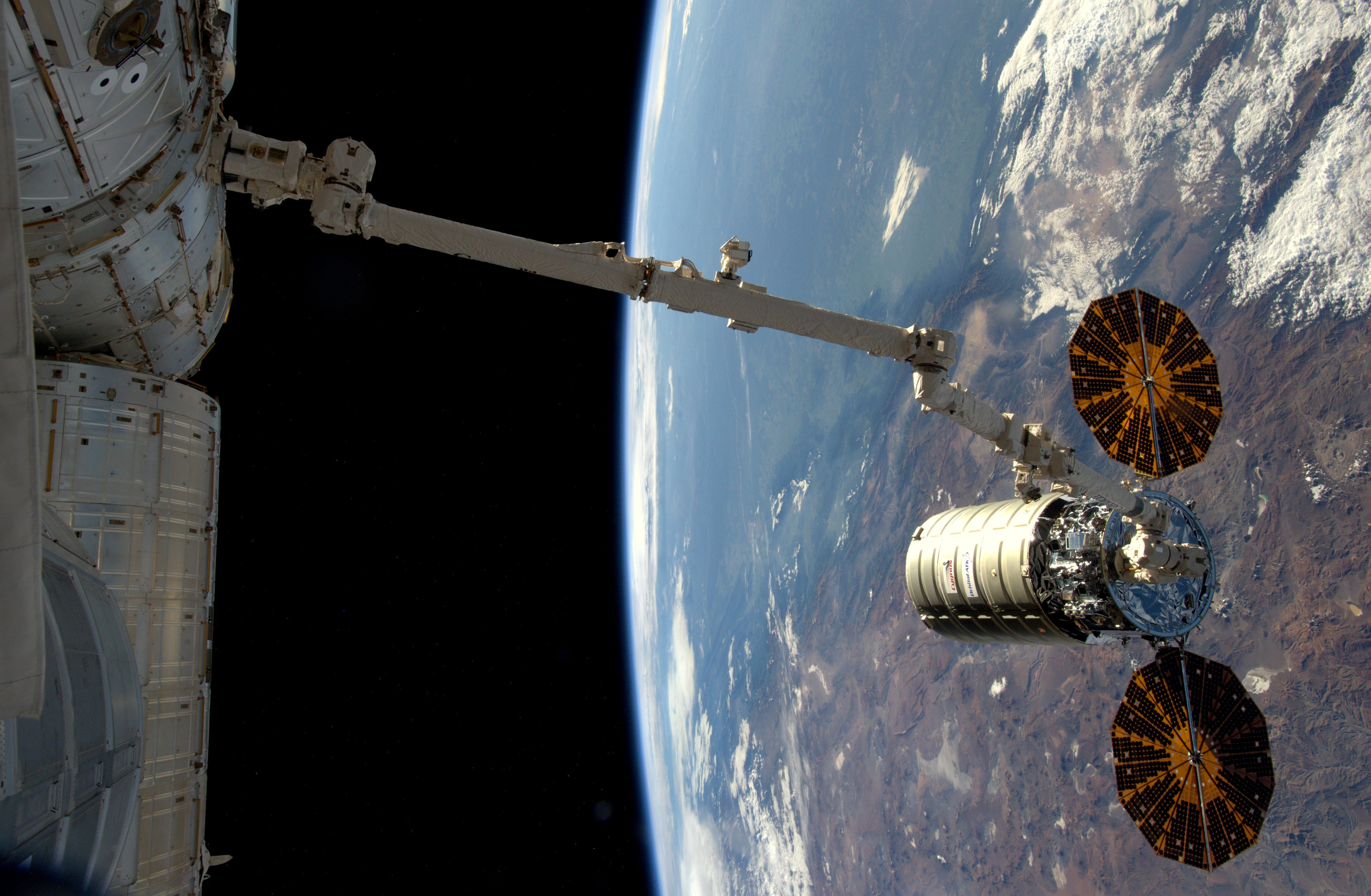
Antares rocket (left); Cygnus spacecraft (right) held by ISS Canadarm2

In August 2022, Northrop Grumman announced it was moving production of the engines and structures for its Antares rockets to the U.S. from Russia and Ukraine in partnership with Texas-based Firefly Aerospace. Northrop Grumman and Firefly Aerospace are jointly producing an upgraded version of the Antares rocket, the Antares 330.

Northrop Grumman's B-21 Raider entered test flights in 2023, with the goal of delivering the first plane by the end of the decade.

On September 15, 2023, Northrop Grumman was sanctioned by the Chinese government due to U.S. arms sales to Taiwan.

In May 2024, Northrop Grumman unveiled the Manta Ray, an underwater drone developed for the Defense Advanced Projects Research Agency (DARPA). The drone, which resembles its namesake sea creature, was designed to carry out long-duration, long-range military missions, including extended loitering on the sea bottom. The craft uses two four-bladed propellers on the wings to enhance the propulsion provided by its gliding system, which glides forward while moving up and down in the water column by changing its buoyancy. With an emphasis on minimal human oversight, the creation of the Manta Ray represents a significant advancement in unmanned underwater vehicles (UUV) technology.

In September 2024, Northrop Grumman won the U.S. Missile Defense Agency (MDA) competition to develop and build the Glide Phase Interceptor (GPI). In 2025, the company secured a contract with the U.S. Space Force to test in-space satellite refueling technology Northrop developed. Northrop Grumman is also constructing ground stations to support the Next-Generation Overhead Persistent Infrared program. In May 2025, the company invested $50 million in space startup Firefly to support production of their "Eclipse" rocket.

== Operations ==
Northrop Grumman’s business is focused on developing new technology in various sectors, including land, sea, air, space, and cyber domains. Formally, as of 2019 the company is divided into four operating sectors: Aeronautics Systems, Defense Systems, Mission Systems and Space Systems.

=== Aeronautics Systems ===
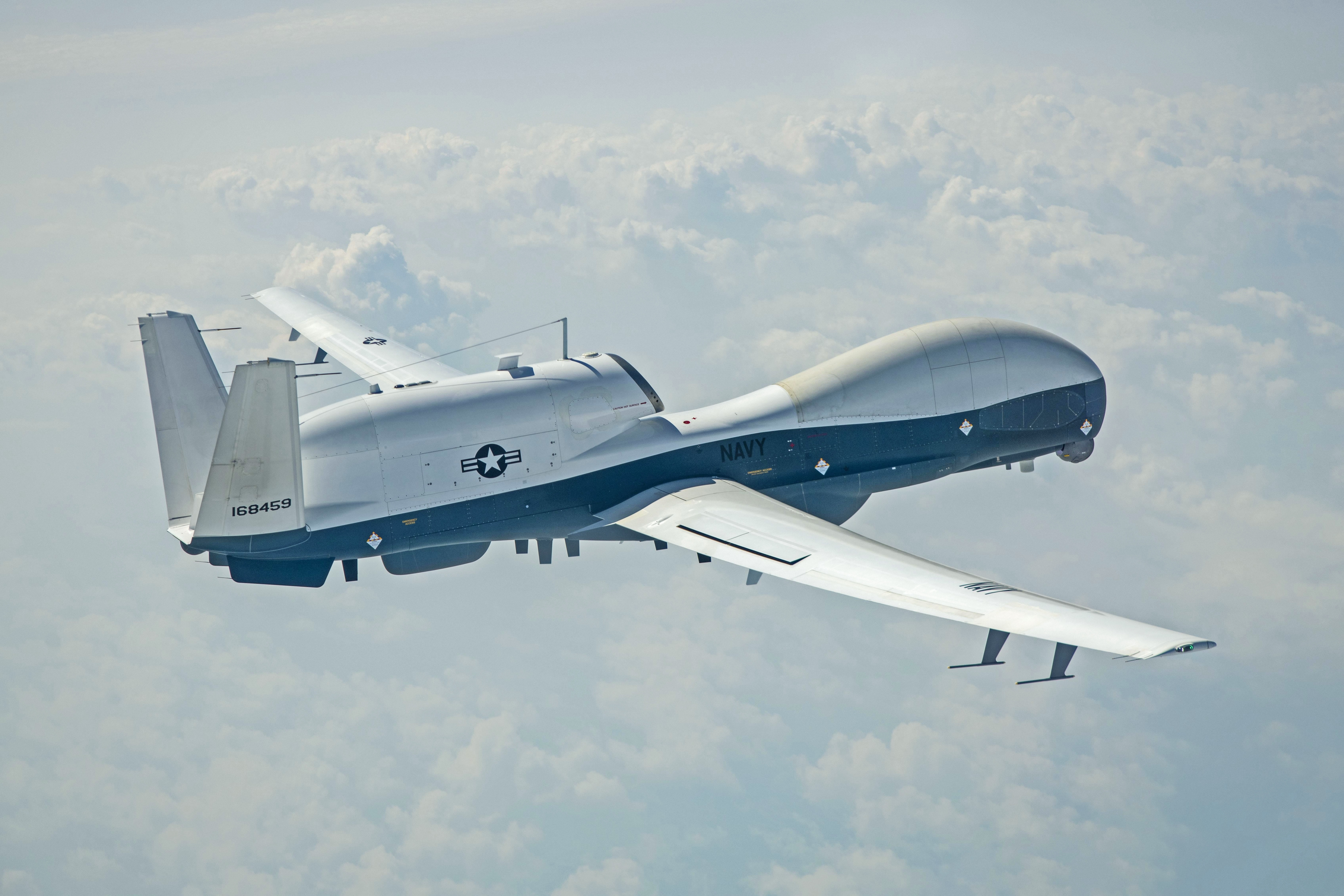
An MQ-4C Triton conducting a test flight

Aeronautics Systems, headquartered in Palmdale, California, produces military aircraft, autonomous systems, and aerospace structures for the U.S. and other nations. Major products include the E-2D Advanced Hawkeye, an airborne early warning and control aircraft used by the U.S. Navy; the B-2 Spirit, a strategic bomber introduced in 1988; the B-21 Raider, a strategic bomber with a first flight in 2023; and the MQ-4C Triton, a high-altitude long endurance unmanned aerial system for maritime surveillance.

=== Mission Systems ===
Mission Systems, headquartered in Linthicum, Maryland, creates military radar, sensors, and microelectronics like semiconductor chips. This unit developed the AN/APG-83 Scalable Agile Beam Radar upgrade for the F-16 Fighting Falcon and the AN/TPS-80 Ground/Air Task Oriented Radar (G/ATOR). It also developed the Integrated Viper Electronic Warfare Suite, a tool to improve situational awareness and detect electronic threats against an aircraft.

=== Space Systems ===
The Space Systems sector, headquartered in McLean, Virginia, provides space and launch systems to commercial and government customers. Northrop Grumman's space operations include construction of the James Webb Space Telescope and the construction and operation of the Cygnus spacecraft that delivers supplies to the International Space Station. The company is also creating the Habitation and Logistics Outpost (HALO) module for NASA's Lunar Gateway and has begun development of the Next-Generation Overhead Persistent Infrared Polar (NGP) as part of efforts to modernize U.S. missile defense systems.

Northrop Grumman produces solid rocket motors, including for Space Launch Systems and for Graphite-Epoxy Motors, and developed the Glide Phase Interceptor. The company is a contractor for the Space Development Agency's Tranche 1 Transport and Tracking Layer. In April 2025, the U.S. Space Force gave Northrop Grumman a contract for Elixir, a new mission to develop and demonstrate a satellite refueling capability.

=== Defense Systems ===
Northrop Grumman's Defense Systems unit encompasses products related to technology services, directed energy, information systems, and tactical weapons. The company supplies the U.S. Army with its Integrated Battle Command System (IBCS), which operates on a modular open systems architecture framework to network sensors and interceptors among different operators. Other products of this unit include the LGM-35 Sentinel intercontinental ballistic missile program, Bushmaster chain guns, the AARGM-ER anti-radiation missile, and the M1156 precision guidance kit.

== Corporate governance ==
From 1990 to 2003, before the merger with Grumman in 1994, Kent Kresa was the CEO of the company, who led the serial-acquisition strategy with a total of 15 additional acquisitions from 1994 to 2003, including Litton, Logicon, Westinghouse's defense electronics business, Ryan Aeronautical and Newport News Shipbuilding, and TRW. He retired in 2003 at age 65.

In 2003 Ronald Sugar, the former chief operating officer, took over as CEO. Effective October 1, 2003, Sugar also served as the company chairman of the board.

In January 2010, Wes Bush succeeded as CEO and became company president.

In November 2015, Gloria Flach was named COO. She is the former president of the company's electric services sector.

On July 12, 2018, Wes Bush announced that he would step down as CEO effective January 1, 2019, and would remain chairman of the board until July 2019. His successor is Kathy J. Warden, who has served in numerous roles at the company, most recently president and COO.

== Corporate headquarters ==
Northrop Grumman's headquarters in West Falls Church, Virginia

Since 2011, Northrop Grumman's headquarters are in West Falls Church, Virginia. Before 2011, the company was headquartered in Los Angeles. It decided to move to be closer to its government clients.

== Accolades and criticism ==
Northrop Grumman was named Forbes's Company of the Year in 2002. Forbes's announcement credited the company with "master[ing] the art of innovation". As of 2019, the company is included on Forbes' list of "America's Best Large Employers".

Since 2005 Northrop Grumman credits itself with sponsoring educational programs and donating thousands of dollars to various charities.

Many members of the U.S. government have attended company events and spoken highly of the company and its contributions, for example John McCain. In December 2007, Northrop Grumman Corporation was awarded the Ron Brown Award for Corporate Leadership, the only presidential award recognizing companies for outstanding achievement in employee and community relations.

In 2022, Northrop Grumman and NASA received the National Aeronautic Association's (NAA) Collier Trophy, referred to as the highest honor in aviation, for the James Webb Space Telescope. Aviation Week gave Northrop Grumman Grand Laureate Awards for its leadership in the James Webb Space Telescope in 2022 and the B-21 Raider stealth bomber in 2024.

=== Environmental record ===
In 2000, Northrop Grumman was designated a Potentially Responsible Party under federal Superfund laws at 13 hazardous waste sites and under state Superfund laws at eight sites. The corporation has also been linked to 52 superfund toxic waste sites. Based on 2008 data, Northrop Grumman was the 62nd-largest corporate producer of air pollution in the United States, per the Political Economy Research Institute of the University of Massachusetts Amherst. Northrop Grumman facilities released more than 23,798 pounds of toxic chemicals into the air in that year.

In 2002, the Bethpage Community Park in Bethpage, New York, owned by the company until the 1960s, was closed due to soil contamination with polychlorinated biphenyls (PCBs). The company dumped cadmium, arsenic, chromium-tainted sludge, solvents, paints and PCBs at the site between 1949 and 1962. Additionally, two toxic chemical plumes centered under Bethpage Community Park and other surrounding land formerly owned by Grumman or Northrop Grumman have spread to under neighboring houses. In November 2013, the Bethpage Water District filed a multimillion-dollar lawsuit against Northrop Grumman in Federal Court for the Eastern District of New York for contaminating the groundwater in Bethpage.

In 2003, the company was among 84 parties with which the United States Environmental Protection Agency, the U.S. Department of Justice, and the state of New York reached an estimated US$15 million settlement for the rehabilitation of the Mattiace Petrochemical Company Superfund site in Glen Cove, Long Island. In the same year, Northrop Grumman agreed to pay $33,214 after EPA inspectors found hazardous waste violations at the Capistrano test site.

In October 2010, the company was named one of Computerworld's Top 12 Green-IT organizations for its large-scale data center migration effort.

In 2019, Northrop Grumman was named the US's largest corporate contributor to water pollution by the Political Economy Research Institute of the University of Massachusetts Amherst.

=== Political contributions and governmental ties ===
From 1990 to 2002, Northrop Grumman contributed $8.5 million to federal campaigns. According to Political action committee (PAC) summary data compiled by Source Watch, the company gave US$1,011,260 to federal candidates in the 2005–2006 election cycle, compared to $10,612,837 given by all defense contractors in the same cycle. This donation amount was only behind that of General Dynamics and Lockheed Martin in the defense industry. The majority of the contributions, 63%, went to Republicans.

Former Northrop Grumman Electronics Systems chief James G. Roche served as Secretary of the Air Force for two years under George W. Bush. Roche would eventually be nominated to head the Army, but withdrew his nomination among accusations of mismanaging a contract with Boeing and for failing to properly handle the Air Force sexual assault scandals of 2003. According to CorpWatch, "at least seven former officials, consultants, or shareholders of Northrop Grumman" have held posts "in the Bush administration...including Deputy Secretary of Defense Paul Wolfowitz, Vice-Presidential Chief of Staff I. Lewis Libby, Pentagon Comptroller Dov S. Zakheim, and Sean O'Keefe, director of NASA". Wolfowitz and Libby have both since left the government amid scandals.

The company engages third-party lobbying firms in jurisdictions where it has interests. For example, in South Australia it works with lobbying firm CMAX Communications.

=== Controversies ===
In the late 1980s and early 1990s, Northrop was the target of several high-profile criminal and civil cases.

In 1995, Robert Ferro, an employee for TRW Inc., a company Northrop Grumman acquired in 2002, discovered that satellite components manufactured for the U.S. Air Force (USAF) were faulty and likely to fail in operation. TRW suppressed Ferro's report of the problem and hid the information from the USAF, even after a satellite in space equipped with the faulty components experienced serious anomalies. Ferro later sued Northrop Grumman in federal court under the federal whistle-blower law.

In 1999, the company was sued for knowingly giving the Navy defective aircraft. This suit sought $210 million in damages. Ten years later, on April 2, 2009, Northrop Grumman agreed to pay $325 million to settle the suit. Ferro was awarded $48.8 million of the settlement. Northrop Grumman stated, "it believed that TRW had 'acted properly under its contracts' and that the company had substantive defenses against the claims".

In 2001, federal investigators probed NG for fraud of more than $100 million, systematic overcharging for radar jammers and other high-tech devices used in the B-1 bomber, the F-15 fighter and the B-2 Stealth bomber. In 2003, the company was sued for overcharging the U.S. government for space projects in the 1990s. Northrop Grumman paid $111.2 million to settle out of court.

From August 25 to September 2, 2010, Virginia's computer system operated by NG, under a $2.4 billion contract, experienced an outage which resulted in around 45,000 citizens not being able to renew their drivers licenses prior to their expiration. Computer systems for 26 of the state's 89 agencies were affected and Governor Bob McDonnell announced that some data may have been permanently lost. In 2010 Northrop Grumman apologized for the outage, and agreed to fund an investigation.

In 2012, controversy began over Northrop Grumman's Integrated Air and Missile Defense Battle Command System (IBCS), when it missed its first deadline. Since then, the system has had a number of controversial developments. In 2016, a Director, Operational Test and Evaluation found a number of major faults with the system, concluding it was "neither mature nor stable".

Northrop Grumman's supply of weapons to Israel led to protests against the company during the Gaza war, including blocking the entrances at facilities in San Diego and Plymouth, Minnesota. Students on hunger strike at Brown University named Northrop Grumman as a company to divest from.

=== International Traffic in Arms Regulations (ITAR) violations ===
U.S. State Department investigators found that Litton Industries, a subsidiary acquired by Northrop Grumman in 2000, had provided portions of source code used by guidance and navigation system interfaces aboard Air Force One to a company in Russia in 1998. Northrop Grumman agreed to pay a $15 million fine for 110 violations, occurring between September 1998 and November 1998, of the Arms Export Control Act and the International Traffic in Arms Regulations (ITAR).

Additionally, documents filed by the State Department state that between 1994 and 2003, Northrop Grumman failed to notify the U.S. State Department about the computer guidance systems also being transferred to Angola, Indonesia, Israel, China, Ukraine and Yemen.

== See also ==
- IMETS
- Northrop Grumman RQ-180 Unmanned Aircraft System
- Top 100 contractors of the U.S. federal government – $30.1 billion in FY2018
- Northrop Grumman M-ACE
