= National Electronics Museum =

Museum in Linthicum, Maryland

- Location within Maryland
- Established: 1980
- Location: Middle River, Maryland (Opening summer 2026); Hunt Valley, Maryland (2023-2026); Linthicum, Maryland (1983-2023)
- Coordinates: 39°19′47″N 76°25′52″W
- Founder: Robert Dwight
- Executive director: Aubrey Quasney
- Website: www.nationalelectronicsmuseum.org

The National Electronics Museum, located in Hunt Valley, Maryland, displays the history of the United States defense electronics. The museum houses exhibits containing assortments of telegraphs, radios, radars and satellites. Located near the light rail stop at Gilroy Road, the museum displays hands-on electronics. The library serves as a research center open to the public. In addition, an amateur radio station is broadcast live from the museum each week. K3NEM/W3GR includes both antique and updated communication equipment.

== History ==
The National Electronics Museum was created by Westinghouse employees. Robert L. Dwight, who worked for the Westinghouse Defense and Electronics Systems Center located in Baltimore, Maryland, jump-started the current collection in 1973 by conducting a "Family Day" to display his colleagues' work while involving their families. Titled "Yesterday, Today, and Tomorrow", the exhibit showed examples of past and present Westinghouse work to represent the company's progress through the eras.

Dwight then decided to pursue more radar systems and other electronics for viewing. His first mission, taken on with the help of Jack Sun, a former U.S. Air Force officer and Westinghouse employee, was to acquire the BOMARC missile radar from the Department of Defense. This missile housed the first airborne pulse-doppler radar, AN/DPN-53. However, in order to gain access to the radar they had to be classified as a non-profit museum.

After gaining advice and paperwork from Westinghouse lawyer, Butch Gregory, they founded the National Electronics Museum in 1980.

Finances and storage space were handled by Westinghouse, and in 1983 a 190 m² (2,000 sq-ft) portion of space was devoted to the museum at the Airport Square III. Then, in 1986 the space was extended to 370 m² (4,000 sq-ft). Formerly run by volunteers, the museum hired its first professional employee in 1989 and subsequently relocated to Friendship Square in 1992.

In 1996, Northrop Grumman bought Westinghouse and continued support for museum efforts. The museum closed its doors temporarily when it underwent construction in 1999 and reopened with over 2000 m² (22,000 sq-ft) of space. This space included a conference room, event hall, gallery, and a climate-controlled warehouse.

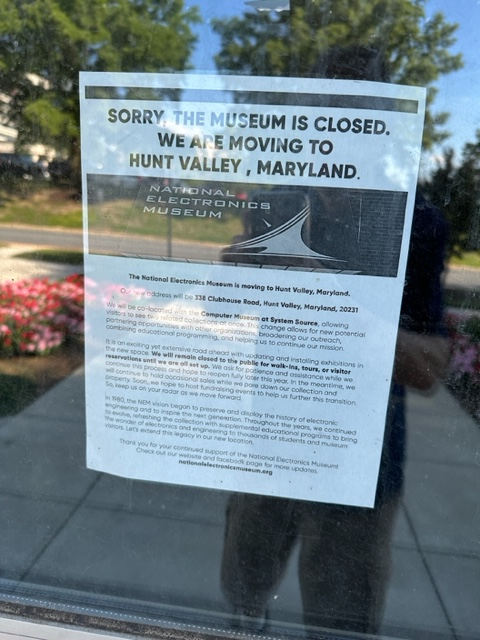
Closed for relocation sign, as of 2023

The museum offers education programs such as YESS (Young Engineers and Scientists) and the annual Robot Fest (held annually on the last weekend of April), as well as the Robert L. Dwight scholarship. Donations and grants are accepted from foundations and engineering societies. Board members include former Westinghouse employees and Northrop Grumman associates. Other public foundations such as Anne Arundel County Public Schools, Camegie Institute, American Alliance of Museums, the University of Maryland – Baltimore County, Johns Hopkins Applied Physics Lab, Allied Signal, and Hertzbach & Company support the museum. Over 30 volunteers donate over 5,000 hours of their time each year.

In 2023, the museum closed at its Linthicum site, and has of 2024 relocation to Hunt Valley, Maryland, where it is adjacent to the Computer Museum at System Source.

In 2026, the museum announced that it was moving to the Maryland Aerospace Heritage Center, where it will be co-located with the Glenn L. Martin Maryland Aviation Museum.

== Galleries ==
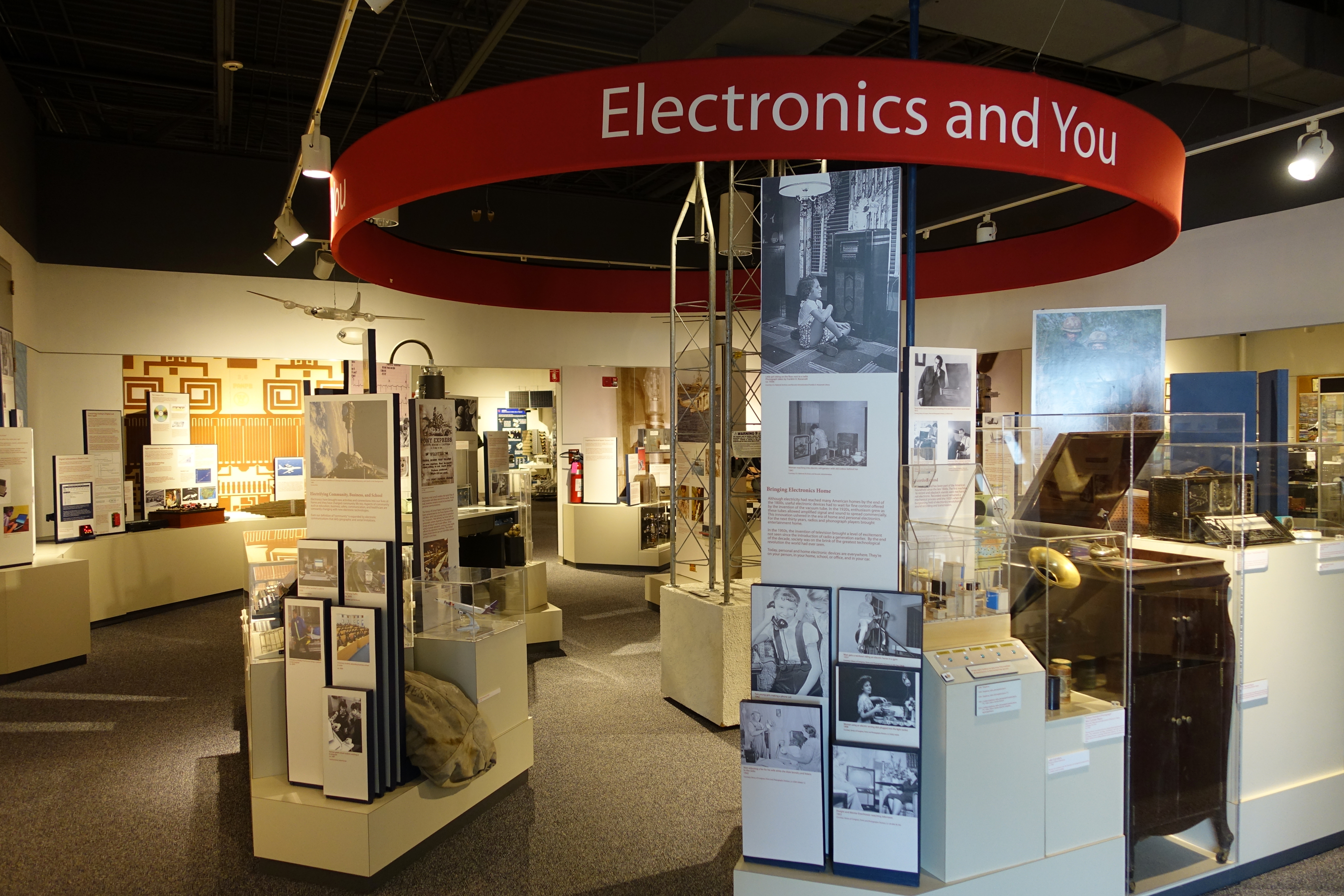
Gallery inside the museum

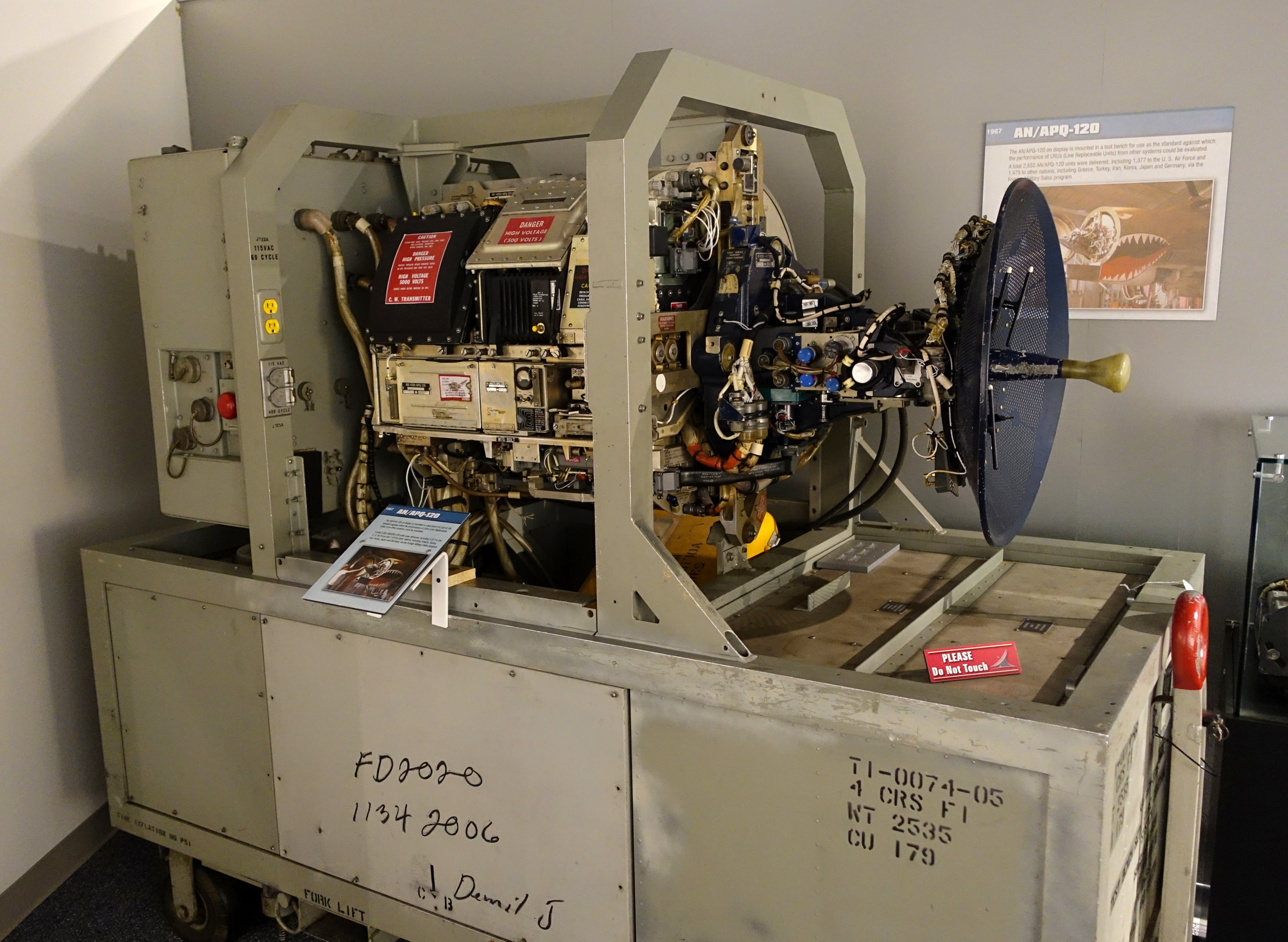
AN-APQ-120 radar and test bench

The National Electronics Museum is organized into twelve related exhibit galleries:

- Fundamentals Gallery – Focuses on the basics of electricity and electronics as well as early electronics
- Communications Gallery – From the telegraph to modern computers, this gallery focuses on a wide range of communication devices, including Ham Radio and the Enigma Machine.
- Early Radar Gallery – Radar from World War II, to the include the actual SCR-270 unit used at the Opana Radar Site on December 7, 1941.
- Cold War Radar Gallery – The Cold War advanced technology in many areas, including radar.
- Modern Radar Gallery – Radar has continued to develop, as is shown in this gallery
- Countermeasures Gallery – As Radar has developed, so have ways to hide from it, including jammers, receivers, and transmitters.
- Under Seas Gallery – Focuses on SONAR as well as other underwater technology
- Electro-optical Gallery – Focuses on the basics of infrared versus visual and the applications of infrared and Electro-optical technology
- Space Sensor Gallery – From satellites to the cameras used on the Moon, this gallery looks at the technologies that have been used outside Earth
- Temporary Gallery – The museum has gallery space that changes regularly.
- Outside Gallery – Six Historic radar Antennas, spanning 75 years of radar development, stand around the museum.

== Events ==
- RobotFest – held at the museum annually
- Pioneer Camp – held at the museum each summer

== See also ==
- List of museums in Maryland
