= Lockheed Martin F-22 Raptor =

American stealth air superiority fighter

F-22 Raptor
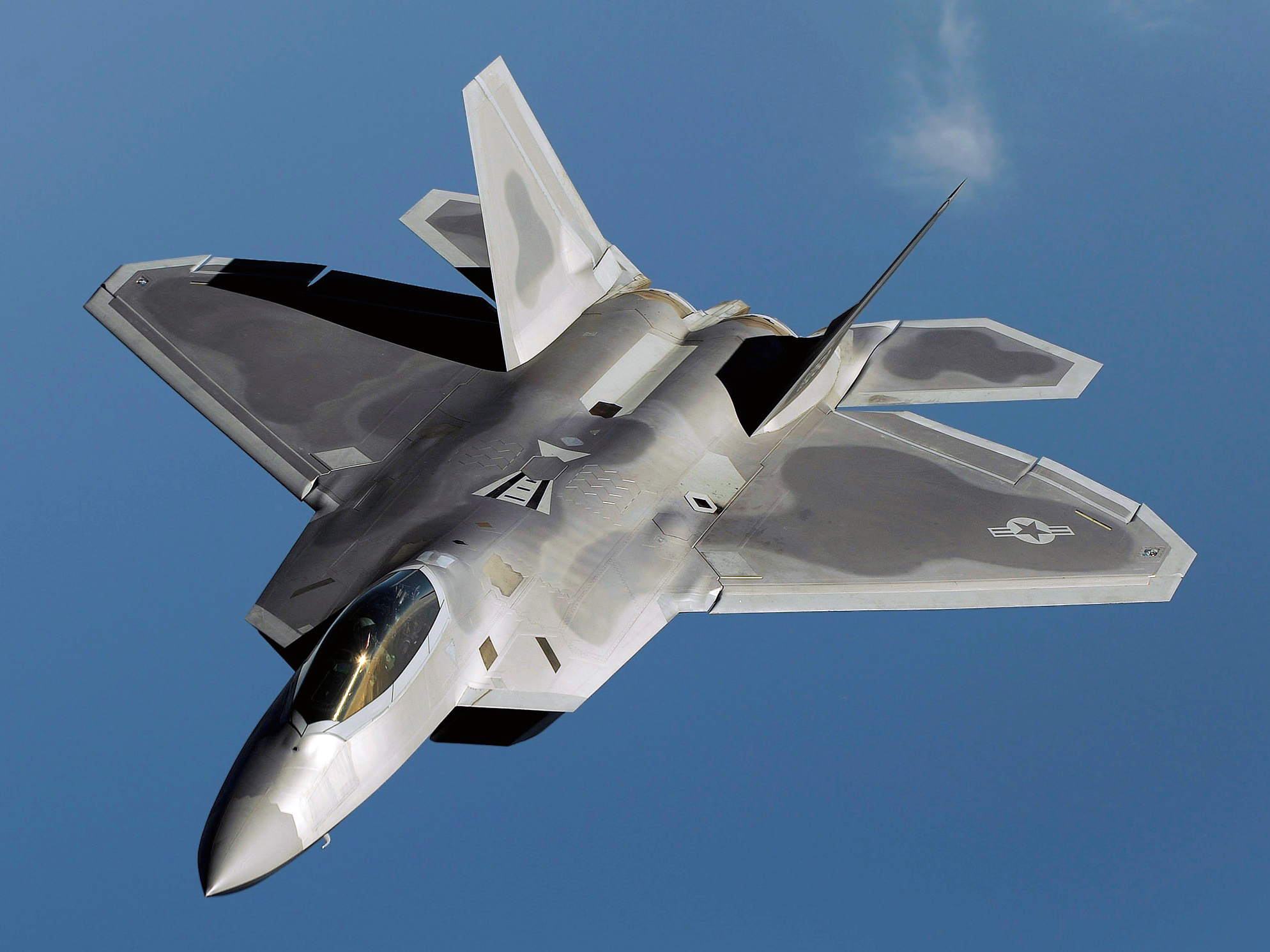
- An F-22 over Kadena Air Base, Japan, in 2009

General information
- Type: Air superiority fighter
- National origin: United States
- Manufacturer: Lockheed Martin Aeronautics; Boeing Integrated Defense Systems
- Status: In service
- Primary user: United States Air Force
- Number built: 195 (8 test and 187 operational aircraft) (Note: Total production run consisted of 9 Engineering & Manufacturing Development (EMD) and 186 production aircraft; the last two EMD aircraft were in a Production Representative Test Vehicle (PRTV) configuration, while one of the production aircraft was a dedicated flight sciences test vehicle; at times, the production run was listed as 8 test and 187 production aircraft.)

History
- Manufactured: 1996–2011
- Introduction date: 15 December 2005
- First flight: 7 September 1997; 29 years ago
- Developed from: Lockheed YF-22
- Developed into: Lockheed Martin X-44 MANTA; Lockheed Martin FB-22; (both proposed)

The Lockheed Martin–Boeing F-22 Raptor is an American twin-engine, jet-powered, all-weather, supersonic stealth fighter aircraft. As a product of the United States Air Force's (USAF) Advanced Tactical Fighter (ATF) program, the aircraft was designed as an air superiority fighter, but also incorporates ground attack, electronic warfare, and signals intelligence capabilities. The prime contractor, Lockheed Martin, built most of the F-22 airframe and weapons systems and conducted final assembly, while program partner Boeing provided the wings, aft fuselage, avionics integration, and training systems.

First flown in 1997, the F-22 descended from the Lockheed YF-22 and was variously designated F-22 and F/A-22 before it formally entered service in December 2005 as the F-22A. It replaced the F-15 Eagle in most active duty USAF squadrons. Although the service had originally planned to buy a total of 750 ATFs to replace its entire F-15 fleet, it later scaled down to 381 and the program was ultimately cut to 195 aircraft – 187 of them operational models – in 2009 due to political opposition from high costs, a perceived lack of air-to-air threats at the time of production, and the development of the more affordable and versatile F-35 Lightning II. (Note: Referring to statements made by the Secretary of Defense Robert Gates: "The secretary once again highlighted his ambitious next-year request for the more-versatile F-35s.") The last aircraft was delivered in 2012.

The F-22 is a critical component of the USAF's tactical airpower as its most advanced air superiority fighter. While it had a protracted development and initial operational difficulties, the aircraft became the service's leading counter-air platform. Its regular deployments have included Okinawa, the Middle East, and NATO's eastern front. Although designed for air superiority operations, the F-22 first engaged in combat by conducting airstrikes in 2014 during the US intervention in Syria. The F-22 has carried out and supported airstrikes in the war in Afghanistan in 2017, 2025 strikes on Iran, 2026 strikes on Venezuela, and the 2026 Iran war. The F-22 is expected to remain a cornerstone of the USAF's fighter fleet until its successor, the Boeing F-47, is expected to enter service around 2030.

== Development ==
=== Origins ===
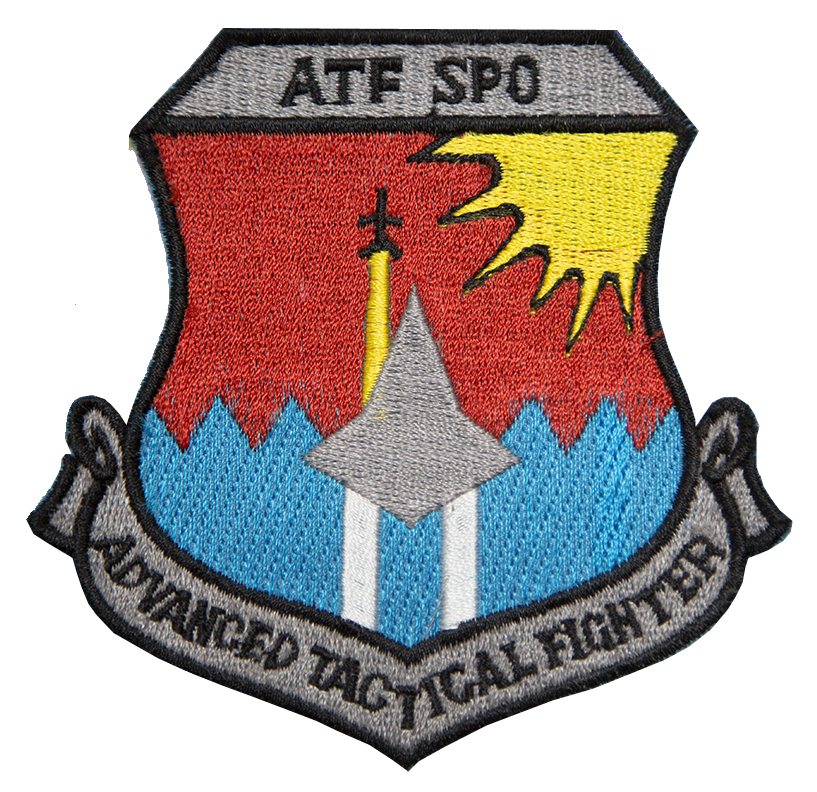
ATF SPO Patch, 1990

The F-22 originated from the Advanced Tactical Fighter (ATF) program that the U.S. Air Force (USAF) initiated in 1981 to replace the F-15 Eagle and F-16 Fighting Falcon. Intelligence reports indicated that their effectiveness would be eroded by emerging worldwide threats emanating from the Soviet Union, including new developments in surface-to-air missile systems for integrated air defense networks, the introduction of the Beriev A-50 "Mainstay" airborne warning and control system (AWACS), and the proliferation of the Sukhoi Su-27 "Flanker" and Mikoyan MiG-29 "Fulcrum" class of fighter aircraft. Code-named "Senior Sky", the ATF would become an air superiority fighter program influenced by these threats; in the potential scenario of a Soviet and Warsaw Pact invasion in Central Europe, the ATF was envisaged to support the air-land battle by spearheading offensive and defensive counter-air operations (OCA/DCA) in this highly contested environment that would then enable following echelons of NATO strike and attack aircraft to perform air interdiction against ground formations; to do so, the ATF would make an ambitious leap in capability and survivability by taking advantage of the new technologies in fighter design on the horizon, including composite materials, lightweight alloys, advanced flight control systems and avionics, more powerful propulsion systems for supersonic cruise (or supercruise) around Mach 1.5, and stealth technology for low observability.

The USAF published an ATF request for information (RFI) to the aerospace industry in May 1981, and following a period of concept and specification development, the ATF System Program Office (SPO) issued the demonstration and validation (Dem/Val) request for proposals (RFP) in September 1985, with requirements placing strong emphasis on stealth, supersonic cruise and maneuver. The RFP saw some alterations after its initial release, including more stringent signature reduction requirements in December 1985 and the addition of the requirement for flying technology demonstrator prototypes in May 1986. (Note: The greatly increased stealth requirements arose from the SPO's discussions with Lockheed and Northrop, the two companies with prior stealth experience from the "Senior Trend"/F-117 and "Senior Ice"/B-2 respectively.) Owing to the immense investments required to develop the advanced technologies, teaming among companies was encouraged. Of the seven bidding companies, (Note: The seven bidding companies for Dem/Val were Lockheed, Northrop, General Dynamics, Boeing, McDonnell Douglas, Grumman, and North American Rockwell.) Lockheed and Northrop were selected on 31 October 1986 as Dem/Val finalists. (Note: Lockheed's design had considerable variations throughout concept exploration, ranging from SR-71/YF-12-like, to faceted designs similar to the F-117, to a curved surface design with an arrowhead-like planform as the company became able to design stealthy shapes with curved surfaces.) Lockheed, through its Skunk Works division at Burbank, California, teamed with Boeing and General Dynamics, while Northrop teamed with McDonnell Douglas. These two contractor teams undertook a 50-month Dem/Val phase to compete for ATF full-scale development, culminating in the flight test of two technology demonstrator prototypes, the Lockheed YF-22 and Northrop YF-23; while they represented competing designs, the prototypes were meant for demonstrating concept viability and risk mitigation rather than a competitive flyoff. (Note: The contractor teams were to give the SPO "sealed envelope" flight performance predictions against which their prototypes would be evaluated, rather than against each other.) Concurrently, Pratt & Whitney and General Electric competed for the ATF engines.

Evolution of the F-22 design from 1987, with the bottom being the production configuration

Dem/Val was focused on system engineering, technology development plans, and risk reduction over point aircraft designs; in fact, after down-select, the Lockheed team completely redesigned the airframe configuration in summer 1987 due to weight analysis, with notable changes including the wing planform from swept trapezoidal to diamond-like delta and a reduction in forebody planform area. The team extensively used analytical and empirical methods including computational fluid dynamics and computer-aided design, wind tunnel testing (18,000 hours for Dem/Val), and radar cross-section (RCS) calculations and pole testing. Avionics were tested in ground prototypes and flying laboratories. During Dem/Val, the SPO used trade studies from both teams to review the ATF system specifications and adjust or delete requirements that were significant weight and cost drivers while having marginal value. The short takeoff and landing (STOL) requirement was relaxed to delete thrust-reversers, saving substantial weight. Side-looking radars and the dedicated infrared search and track (IRST) system were eventually removed as well, although space and cooling provisions were retained to allow for their later addition. The ejection seat was downgraded from a fresh design to the existing ACES II. Despite efforts by both teams to rein in weight, the takeoff gross weight estimates grew from 50,000 to 60,000 lb (22,700 to 27,200 kg), resulting in engine thrust requirement increasing from 30,000 to 35,000 lbf (133 to 156 kN) class.

Each team built two prototype air vehicles for Dem/Val, one for each engine option. The YF-22 had its maiden flight on 29 September 1990 and, in testing, successfully demonstrated supercruise, high angle-of-attack maneuvers, and the firing of air-to-air missiles from internal weapons bays. After the flight test of the demonstrator prototypes at Edwards Air Force Base, the teams submitted the results and their full-scale development design proposals – or Preferred System Concept – in December 1990; on 23 April 1991, the Secretary of the USAF, Donald Rice, announced the Lockheed team and Pratt & Whitney as the winners of the ATF and engine competitions. Both designs met or exceeded all performance requirements; the YF-23 was considered stealthier and faster, but the YF-22, with its thrust vectoring nozzles, was more maneuverable as well as less expensive and risky, having flown considerably more test sorties and hours than its counterpart. The press also speculated that the Lockheed team's design was more adaptable to the Navy Advanced Tactical Fighter (NATF) for replacing the F-14 Tomcat, but by fiscal year (FY) 1992, the U.S. Navy had abandoned NATF due to cost.

=== Full-scale development ===
The program formally moved to full-scale development, or Engineering & Manufacturing Development (EMD), in August 1991. The production F-22 design (internally designated Configuration 645) had also evolved to have notable differences from the YF-22, which was immature due to being frozen relatively soon after the summer 1987 configuration redesign. (Note: The YF-22 outer lines were frozen to allow construction to begin in 1988, resulting in the shaping being rather unrefined, especially compared to the YF-23.) While overall layout was similar, the external geometry saw significant alterations; the wing's leading edge sweep was decreased from 48° to 42°, while the vertical stabilizers were shifted rearward and decreased in area by 20%. The radome shape was changed for better radar performance, the wingtips were clipped for antennas, and the dedicated airbrake was eliminated. To improve pilot visibility, the canopy was moved forward 7 inches (18 cm) and the engine inlets moved rearward 14 inches (36 cm). Overall length was reduced by 2 feet (0.6 m), while wingspan increased by 1.5 feet (0.5 m). The shapes of the fuselage, wing, and stabilator trailing edges were refined to improve aerodynamics, strength, and stealth characteristics. The structural design was refined, with the production airframe engineered for a service life of 8,000 hours. The revised shaping was validated with over 17,000 additional hours of wind tunnel testing and RCS testing at Helendale, California and the USAF RATSCAT range before first flight. Increasing weight during EMD due to demanding ballistic survivability requirements and added capabilities caused slight reductions in projected range and maneuver performance.

An EMD F-22 alongside the Flying Test Bed

Aside from advances in air vehicle and propulsion technology, the F-22's avionics were unprecedented in complexity and scale for a combat aircraft, with the integration of multiple sensor systems and antennas, including electronic warfare, communications, identification friend or foe (IFF), and software of 1.7 million lines of code written in Ada. Avionics often became the pacing factor of the whole program. In light of rapidly advancing computing and semiconductor technology, the avionics was to employ the Department of Defense's (DoD) PAVE PILLAR systems architecture and Very High Speed Integrated Circuit (VHSIC) program technology; the computing and processing requirements were equivalent to multiple contemporary Cray supercomputers to achieve sensor fusion. To enable early looks and troubleshooting for mission software development, the software was ground-tested in Boeing's Avionics Integration Laboratory (AIL) and flight-tested on a Boeing 757 modified with F-22 avionics and sensors, called Flying Test Bed (FTB). Because much of the F-22's avionics design occurred in the 1990s as the electronics industry was shifting from military to commercial applications as the predominant market, avionics upgrade efforts were initially difficult and protracted due to changing industry standards; for instance, C/C++ rather than Ada became predominant programming languages.

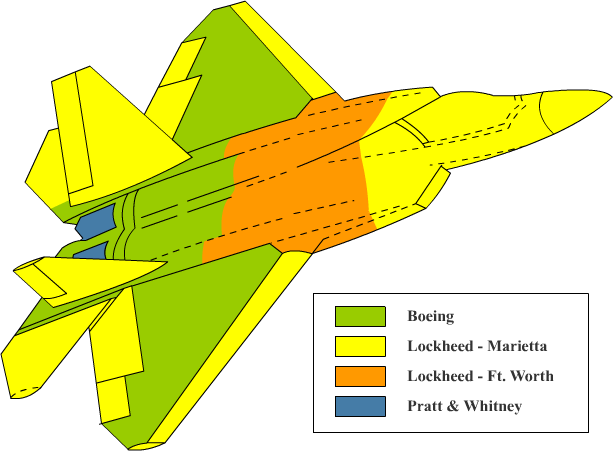
Manufacturers of the F-22

The roughly equal division of work amongst the team largely carried through from Dem/Val to EMD, with prime contractor Lockheed responsible for the forward fuselage and control surfaces, General Dynamics for the center fuselage, and Boeing for aft fuselage and wings. Lockheed acquired General Dynamics' fighter portfolio at Fort Worth, Texas, in 1993 and thus gained the majority of the airframe manufacturing, and merged with Martin Marietta in 1995 to form Lockheed Martin. While Lockheed primarily performed Dem/Val work at its Skunk Works sites in Burbank and Palmdale, California, it shifted its program office and EMD work from Burbank to Marietta, Georgia, where it performed final assembly; Boeing manufactured airframe components, performed avionics integration, and developed the training systems in Seattle, Washington. The EMD contract originally ordered seven single-seat F-22As and two twin-seat F-22Bs, although the latter was canceled in 1996 to reduce development costs and the orders were converted to single-seaters. The first F-22A, an EMD aircraft with tail number 91-4001, was unveiled at Air Force Plant 6 in Dobbins Air Reserve Base in Marietta on 9 April 1997, where it was officially named "Raptor". (Note: The YF-22 was originally given the unofficial name "Lightning II", from the World War II Lockheed P-38 Lightning fighter, which persisted until the mid-1990s, when the USAF officially named the F-22 "Raptor". The aircraft was also briefly dubbed "SuperStar" and "Rapier".) The aircraft first flew on 7 September 1997, piloted by chief test pilot Alfred "Paul" Metz. (Note: Metz was previously the chief test pilot for the YF-23.) The Raptor's designation was briefly changed to F/A-22 starting in September 2002, mimicking the Navy's F/A-18 Hornet and intended to highlight a planned ground-attack capability amid debate over the aircraft's role and relevance. The F-22 designation was reinstated in December 2005, when the aircraft entered service.

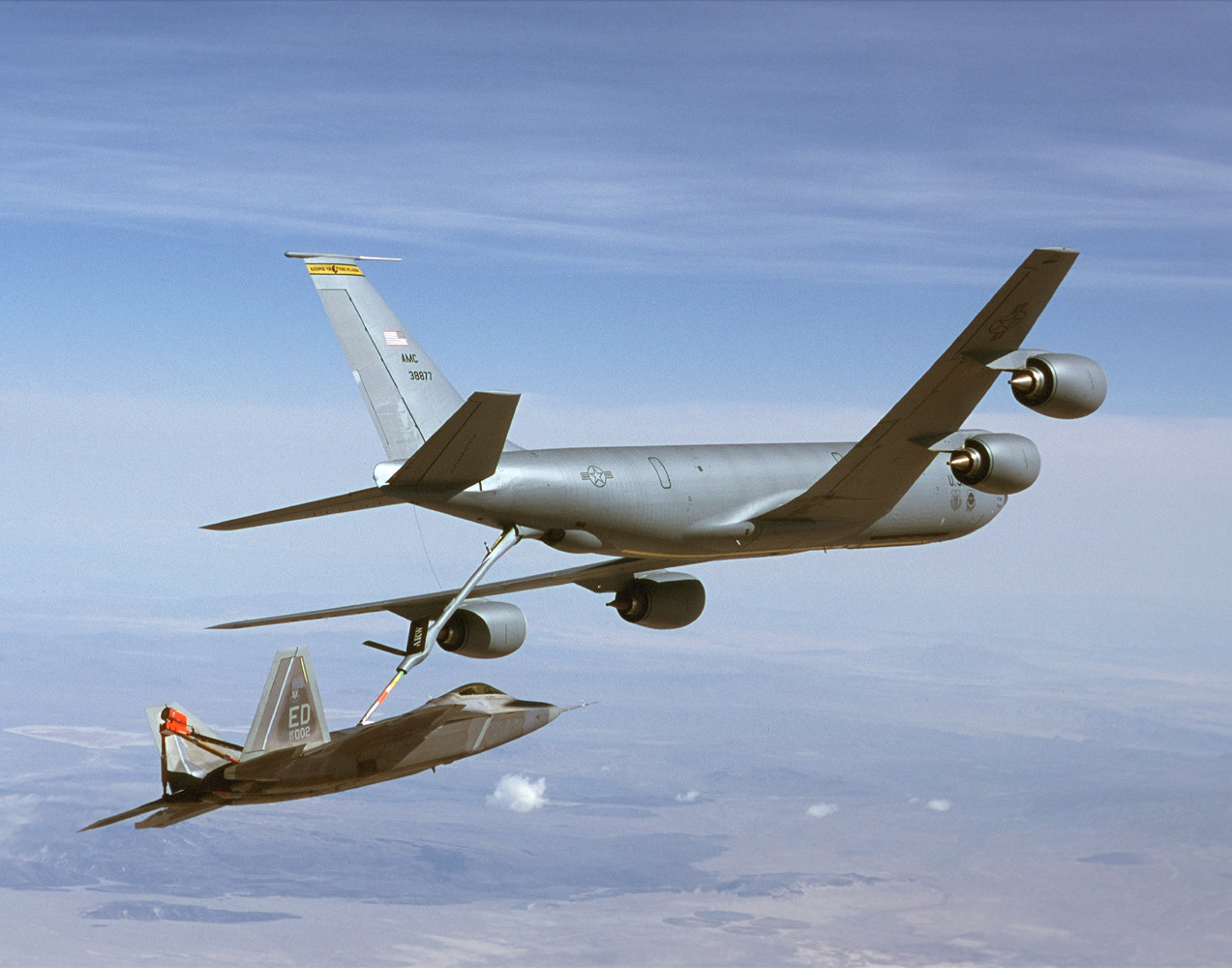
An EMD F-22 refuels from a KC-135 during testing; the attachment on the back top is for a spin recovery chute.

The F-22 flight test program consisted of flight sciences, developmental test (DT), and initial operational test and evaluation (IOT&E) by the 411th Flight Test Squadron (FLTS) at Edwards AFB, California, as well as follow-on OT&E and development of tactics and operational employment by the 422nd Test and Evaluation Squadron (TES) at Nellis AFB, Nevada. Nine EMD jets assigned to the 411th FLTS would participate in the test program under the Combined Test Force (CTF) at Edwards. The first two aircraft conducted envelope expansion testing, such as flying qualities, air vehicle performance, propulsion, and stores separation. The third aircraft, the first to have production-level internal structure, tested flight loads, flutter, and stores separation, while two non-flying F-22s were built for testing static loads and fatigue. Subsequent EMD aircraft and the Boeing 757 FTB tested avionics, environmental qualifications, and observables, with the first combat-capable Block 3.0 software flying in 2001. Air vehicle testing resulted in several structural design modifications and retrofits for earlier lots, including tail fin strengthening to resolve buffeting in certain conditions. Raptor 4001 was retired from flight testing in 2000 and subsequently sent to Wright-Patterson AFB for survivability testing, including live fire testing and battle damage repair training. Other retired EMD F-22s were repurposed as maintenance trainers.

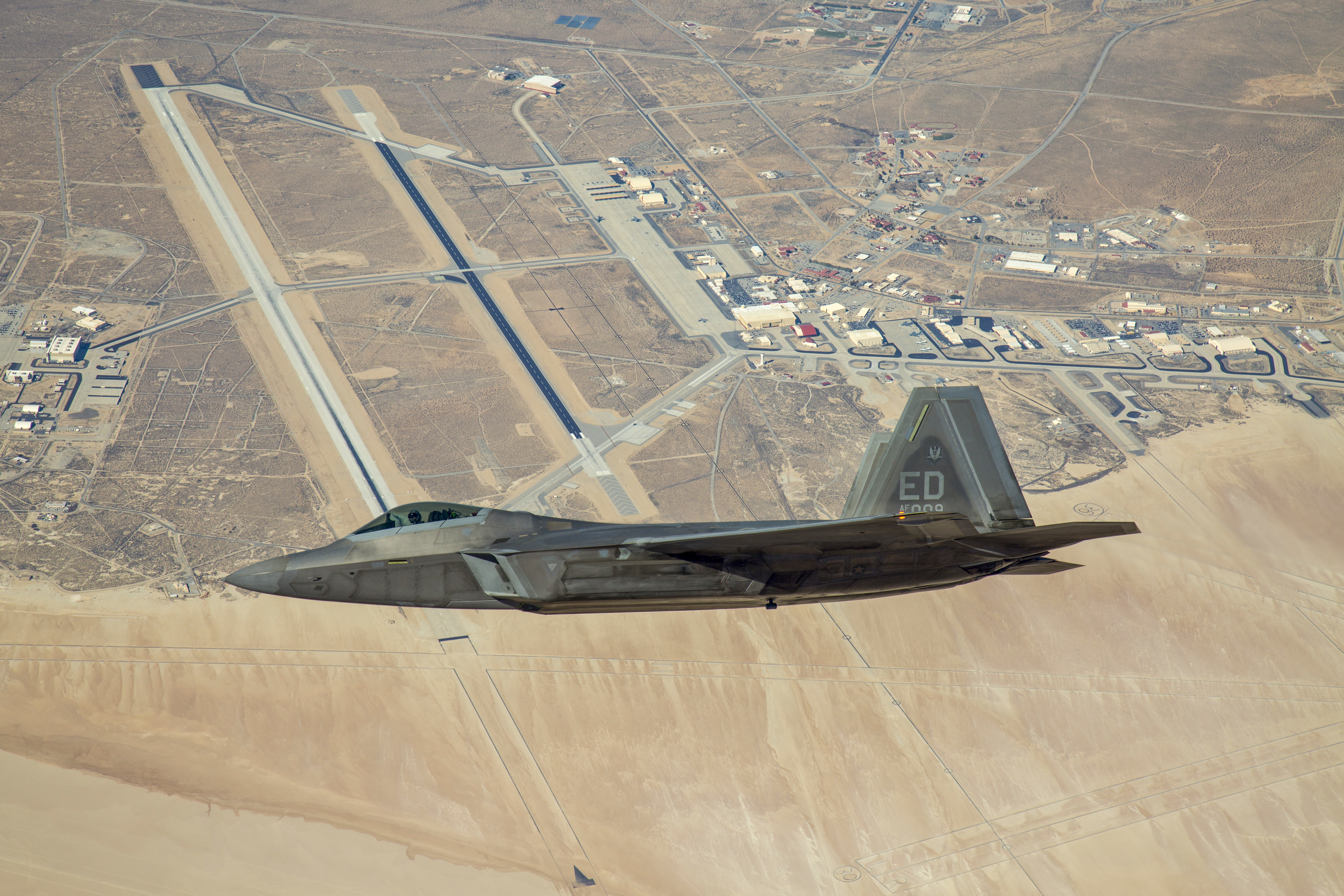
An EMD F-22 of the 411th FLTS flies over Edwards AFB, California, in 2018

Because the F-22 had been designed to defeat contemporary and projected Soviet fighters, the end of the Cold War and the dissolution of the Soviet Union in 1991 had major impacts on program funding; the DoD reduced its urgency for new weapon systems, and the following years would see successive reductions in its budget. This resulted in the F-22's EMD being "rephased", or rescheduled and extended, multiple times. Furthermore, the aircraft's sophistication and numerous technological innovations required extensive testing, which exacerbated the cost overruns and delays, especially from mission avionics. Some capabilities were also deferred to post-service upgrades, reducing the upfront cost but increasing total program cost. The program transitioned to full-rate production in March 2005 and completed EMD that December, after which the test force had flown 3,496 sorties for over 7,600 flight hours. As the F-22 was designed for upgrades throughout its lifecycle, the 411th FLTS and 422nd TES continued the DT/OT&E and tactics development of these upgrades. Derivatives such as the X-44 thrust vectoring research aircraft and the FB-22 medium-range regional bomber were proposed in the late 1990s and early 2000s, although these were eventually abandoned. In 2006, the F-22 development team won the Collier Trophy, American aviation's most prestigious award. Due to the aircraft's sophisticated capabilities, contractors have been targeted by cyberattacks and technology theft.

=== Production and procurement ===
The USAF originally envisioned ordering 750 ATFs at a total program cost of $44.3 billion and procurement cost of $26.3 billion in FY 1985 dollars, with production beginning in 1994 and service entry in the mid-to-late 1990s; this was essentially a 1-for-1 replacement for the service's air superiority F-15A/B/C/D fleet. The 1990 Major Aircraft Review (MAR) led by Secretary of Defense Dick Cheney reduced this to 648 aircraft beginning in 1996 and service entry in the early-to-mid 2000s. After the end of the Cold War, this was further curtailed to 442 in the 1993 Bottom-Up Review while the USAF eventually set its requirement to 381 to support its Air Expeditionary Force structure with the last deliveries in 2013. Throughout development and production, the program was continually scrutinized for its costs and less expensive alternatives such as modernized F-15 or F-16 variants were being proposed, even though the USAF considered the F-22 to provide the greatest capability increase against peer adversaries for the investment. However, funding instability had reduced the total to 339 by 1997, and production was nearly halted by Congress in 1999. (Note: Another reason other than funding issues, the F-22's superior combat capability, has been attributed to cuts to F-22 purchases. In 1997, Defense Secretary William Cohen, for example, cited this as a reason for that year's Quadrennial Defense Review's (QDR) proposed reduction to 341 aircraft.) Although funds were eventually restored, the planned number continued to decline due to delays and cost overruns during EMD, slipping to 277 by 2003. In 2004, with its focus on asymmetric counterinsurgency warfare in Iraq and Afghanistan, the DoD under Secretary Donald Rumsfeld further cut procurement to 183 production aircraft, despite the USAF's requirement for 381; funding for this number was reached by a multi-year procurement contract awarded in 2006, with aircraft distributed to seven combat squadrons; total program cost was projected to be $62 billion (equivalent to approximately $95.1 billion in 2025). In 2008, the Congressional defense spending bill raised the number to 187.

F-22 production would support over 1,000 subcontractors and suppliers from 46 states and up to 95,000 jobs, and spanned 15 years at a peak rate of roughly two airplanes per month, about half of the initially planned rate from the 1990 MAR; after EMD aircraft contracts, the first production lot was awarded in September 2000. As production wound down in 2011, the total program cost was estimated to be about $67.3 billion (about $360 million for each production aircraft delivered), with $32.4 billion spent on Research, Development, Test, and Evaluation (RDT&E) and $34.9 billion on procurement and military construction in then-year dollars. The incremental cost for an additional F-22 was estimated at $138 million (equivalent to approximately $201 million in 2025) in 2009.

In total, 195 F-22s were built. The first two were EMD aircraft in the Block 1.0 (Note: Block number designates production variation groups.) configuration for initial flight testing and envelope expansion, while the third was a Block 2.0 aircraft built to represent the internal structure of production airframes and enabled it to test full flight loads. Six more EMD aircraft were built in the Block 10 configuration for development and upgrade testing, with the last two considered essentially production-quality jets. Production for operational squadrons consisted of 74 Block 10/20 training aircraft and 112 Block 30/35 combat aircraft for a total of 186 (or 187 when accounting for Production Representative Test Vehicles and certain EMD jets); one of the Block 30 aircraft is dedicated to flight sciences at Edwards AFB. By 2020, Block 20 aircraft from Lot 3 onward were upgraded to Block 30 standards under the Common Configuration Plan, increasing the Block 30/35 fleet to 149 aircraft while 37 remained in the Block 20 configuration for training. (Note: The combat-coded fleet consists of 123 primary and 20 reserve airframes, while several Block 30 aircraft are devoted to operational testing and tactics development at Nellis AFB.)

=== Ban on exports ===
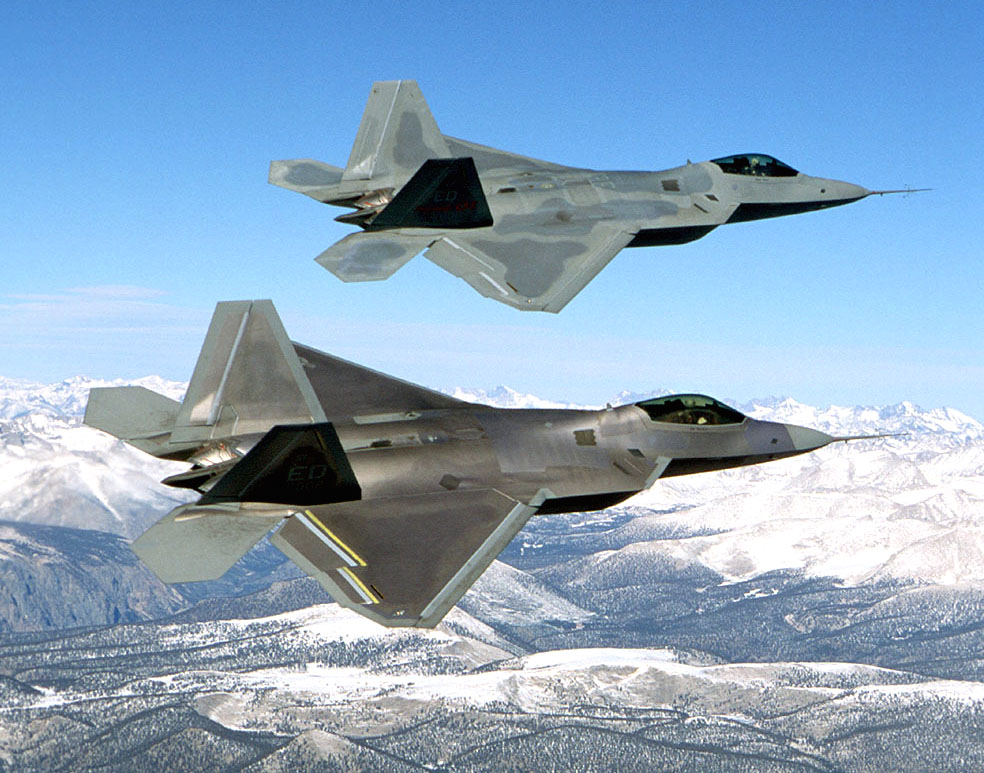
Two F-22s during flight testing, the upper one being the first EMD F-22, Raptor 4001

In order to prevent the inadvertent disclosure of the aircraft's stealth technology and classified capabilities to U.S. adversaries, annual DoD appropriations acts since FY1998 have included a provision prohibiting the use of funds made available in each act to approve or license the sale of the F-22 to any foreign government. Customers for U.S. fighters are acquiring earlier designs such as the F-15 Eagle and F-16 Fighting Falcon or the newer F-35 Lightning II, which contains technology from the F-22 but was designed to be cheaper, more flexible, and available for export. In September 2006, Congress upheld the ban on foreign F-22 sales. Despite the ban, the 2010 defense authorization bill included provisions requiring the DoD to report on the costs and feasibility for an F-22 export variant, and another report on the effect of export sales on the U.S. aerospace industry.

Some Australian defense officials and politicians have expressed interest in procuring the F-22; in 2008, the Chief of the Defence Force, Air Chief Marshal Angus Houston, stated that the aircraft was being considered by the Royal Australian Air Force (RAAF) as a potential supplement to the F-35. Some defense commentators have even advocated for the purchase in lieu of the planned F-35s, citing the F-22's known capabilities and F-35's delays and developmental uncertainties. However, considerations for the F-22 were later dropped, and the F/A-18E/F Super Hornet would serve as the RAAF's interim aircraft prior to the F-35's service entry.

The Japanese government also showed interest in the F-22. The Japan Air Self-Defense Force (JASDF) would reportedly require fewer fighters for its mission if it obtained the F-22, thus reducing engineering and staffing costs. With the end of F-22 production, Japan chose the F-35 in December 2011. At one point, the Israeli Air Force had hoped to purchase up to 50 F-22s. In November 2003, however, Israeli representatives announced that after years of analysis and discussions with Lockheed Martin and the DoD, they had concluded that Israel could not afford the aircraft. Israel eventually purchased the F-35.

=== Production termination ===
Throughout the 2000s, when the U.S. was primarily fighting counterinsurgency wars in Iraq and Afghanistan, the USAF's requirement for 381 F-22s was questioned over rising costs, initial reliability and availability problems, limited multirole versatility, and a lack of relevant adversaries for air combat missions. In 2006, Comptroller General of the United States David Walker found that "the DoD has not demonstrated the need" for more investment in the F-22, and further opposition was expressed by Bush Administration Secretary of Defense Rumsfeld and his successor Robert Gates, Deputy Secretary of Defense Gordon R. England, and Chairman of the U.S. Senate Armed Services Committee (SASC) Senators John Warner and John McCain. Under Rumsfeld, procurement was severely cut to 183 aircraft. The F-22 lost influential supporters in 2008 after the forced resignations of Secretary of the Air Force Michael Wynne and the Chief of Staff of the Air Force General T. Michael Moseley. In November 2008, Gates stated that the F-22 lacked relevance in asymmetric post-Cold War conflicts, and in April 2009, under the Obama Administration, he called for production to end in FY 2011 after completing 187 F-22s.

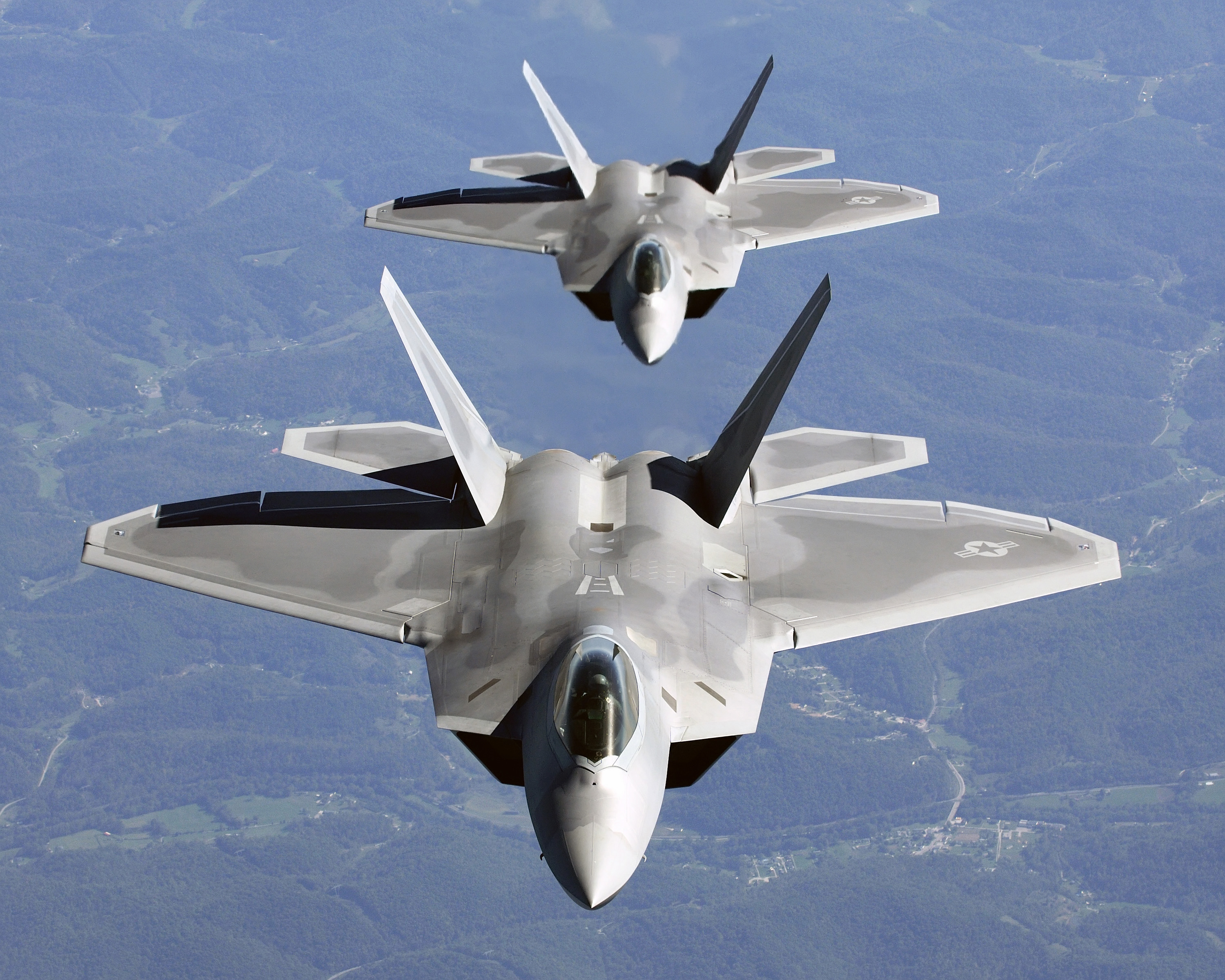
Two F-22As in close trail formation

The loss of staunch F-22 advocates in the upper DoD echelons resulted in the erosion of its political support. In July 2008, General James Cartwright, Vice Chairman of the Joint Chiefs of Staff, stated to the SASC his reasons for supporting the termination of F-22 production, including shifting resources to the multi-service F-35 and the electronic warfare EA-18G Growler. Although Russian and Chinese fighter developments fueled concern for the USAF, Gates dismissed this and in 2010, he set the F-22 requirement to 187 aircraft by lowering the number of major regional conflict preparations from two to one, despite an effort by Wynne's and Moseley's successors Michael Donley and General Norton Schwartz to raise the number to 243; according to Schwartz, he and Donley finally relented in order to convince Gates to preserve the Long Range Strike Bomber program. After President Barack Obama threatened to veto further production at Gates' urging, both the Senate and House agreed to abide by the 187 cap in July 2009. Gates highlighted the F-35's role in the decision, and believed that the U.S. would maintain its stealth fighter numbers advantage by 2025 even with F-35 delays. In December 2011, the 195th and final F-22 was completed out of 8 test and 187 production aircraft built; the jet was delivered on 2 May 2012.

After production ended, F-22 tooling and associated documentation were retained and mothballed at the Sierra Army Depot to support repairs and maintenance throughout the fleet life cycle, as well as the possibility of a production restart or a Service Life Extension Program (SLEP). The Marietta plant space was repurposed to support the C-130J and F-35, while engineering work for sustainment and upgrades continued at Fort Worth, Texas, and Palmdale, California. The curtailed F-22 production forced the USAF to extend the service of 179 F-15C/Ds to the late 2020s—well beyond its planned retirement—to maintain adequate air superiority fighter numbers.

In April 2016, Congress directed the USAF to conduct a cost study and assessment associated with resuming production of the F-22, citing advancing threats from Russia and China. On 9 June 2017, the USAF submitted their report stating they had no plans to restart the F-22 production line due to cost-prohibitive economic and logistical challenges; it estimated it would cost approximately $50 billion to procure 194 additional F-22s at a cost of $206–216 million per aircraft, including approximately $9.9 billion for non-recurring start-up costs and $40.4 billion for acquisition with the first delivery in the mid-to-late 2020s. The long gap since the end of production meant hiring new workers, sourcing replacement vendors, and finding new plant space, contributing to the high start-up costs and lead times. The USAF believed that the funding would be better invested in its next-generation Air Superiority 2030 effort, which evolved into the Next Generation Air Dominance (NGAD). Starting in 2019, to replace its aging F-15C/D still remaining in inventory, the USAF procured a number of new-build F-15EX, which minimized start-up costs by using an active export production line.

=== Modernization and upgrades ===
The F-22 and its subsystems were designed to be upgraded over its life cycle via numbered Increments (Note: Increments were originally called "Spirals".) and Operational Flight Program (OFP) updates in anticipation of technological advances and evolving threats, although this initially proved difficult and costly due to the highly integrated avionics systems architecture. Amid debates over the airplane's relevance in asymmetric counterinsurgency warfare, the first upgrades primarily focused on ground attack, or strike capabilities. Joint Direct Attack Munitions (JDAM) employment was added with Increment 2 in 2005, and Small Diameter Bomb (SDB) was integrated with 3.1 in 2011; the improved AN/APG-77(V)1 radar, which incorporates air-to-ground modes, was certified in March 2007 and fitted on airframes from Lot 5 onward. (Note: Increment 3.1 also incorporated synthetic aperture radar (SAR) mapping, radio emitter direction finding, and electronic attack.) To address oxygen deprivation issues, F-22s were fitted with an automatic backup oxygen system (ABOS) and modified life support system starting in 2012.

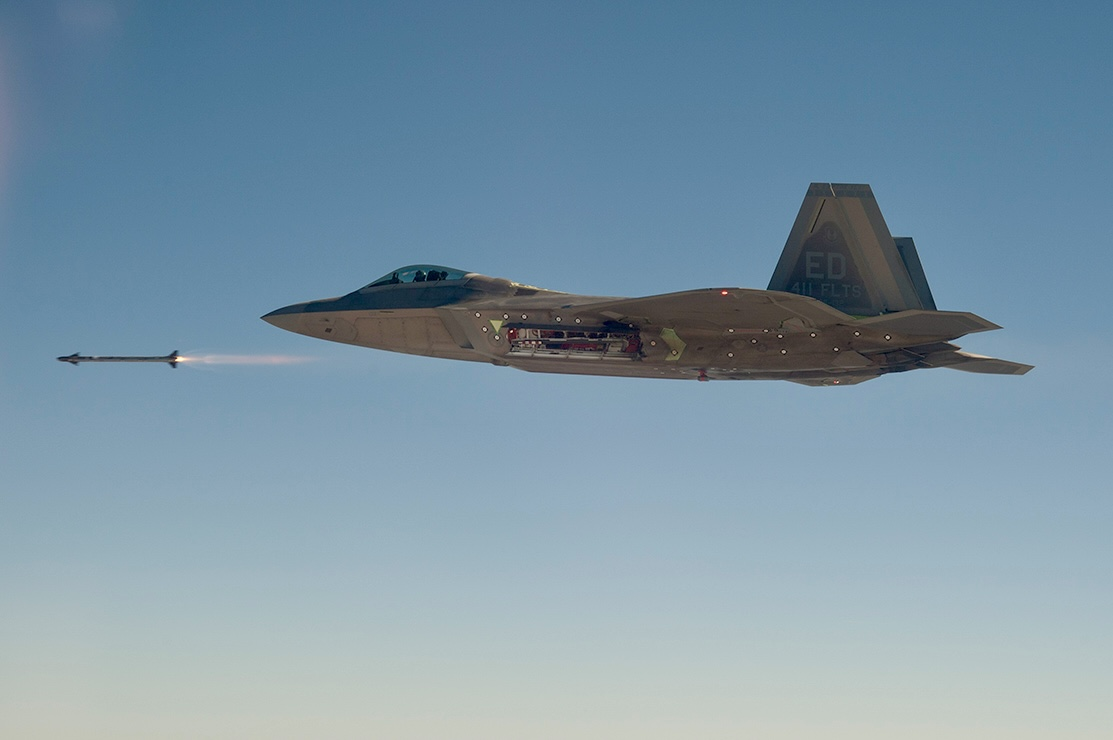
A Block 30 F-22A, serial 06-4132, of the 411th Flight Test Squadron test-fires an AIM-9X in 2015

In contrast to prior upgrades, Increment 3.2 emphasized air combat capabilities with updates to electronic warfare, CNI (including Link 16 receive), and geolocation as well as AIM-9X and AIM-120D integration. Fleet releases of the two-part process began in 2013 and 2019, respectively. Concurrently, OFP updates added Automatic Ground Collision Avoidance System, cryptographic enhancements, and improved avionics stability, among others. A MIDS-JTRS terminal, which includes Mode 5 IFF and Link 16 transmit/receive capability, was installed starting in 2021. To address obsolescence and modernization difficulties, the F-22's mission computers were upgraded in 2021 with military-hardened commercial off-the-shelf (COTS) open mission system (OMS) processor modules with a modular open systems architecture (MOSA). An agile software development process in conjunction with an orchestration system was implemented to enable faster upgrades from additional vendors, and software updates shifted away from Increments developed using the waterfall model to numbered annual releases.

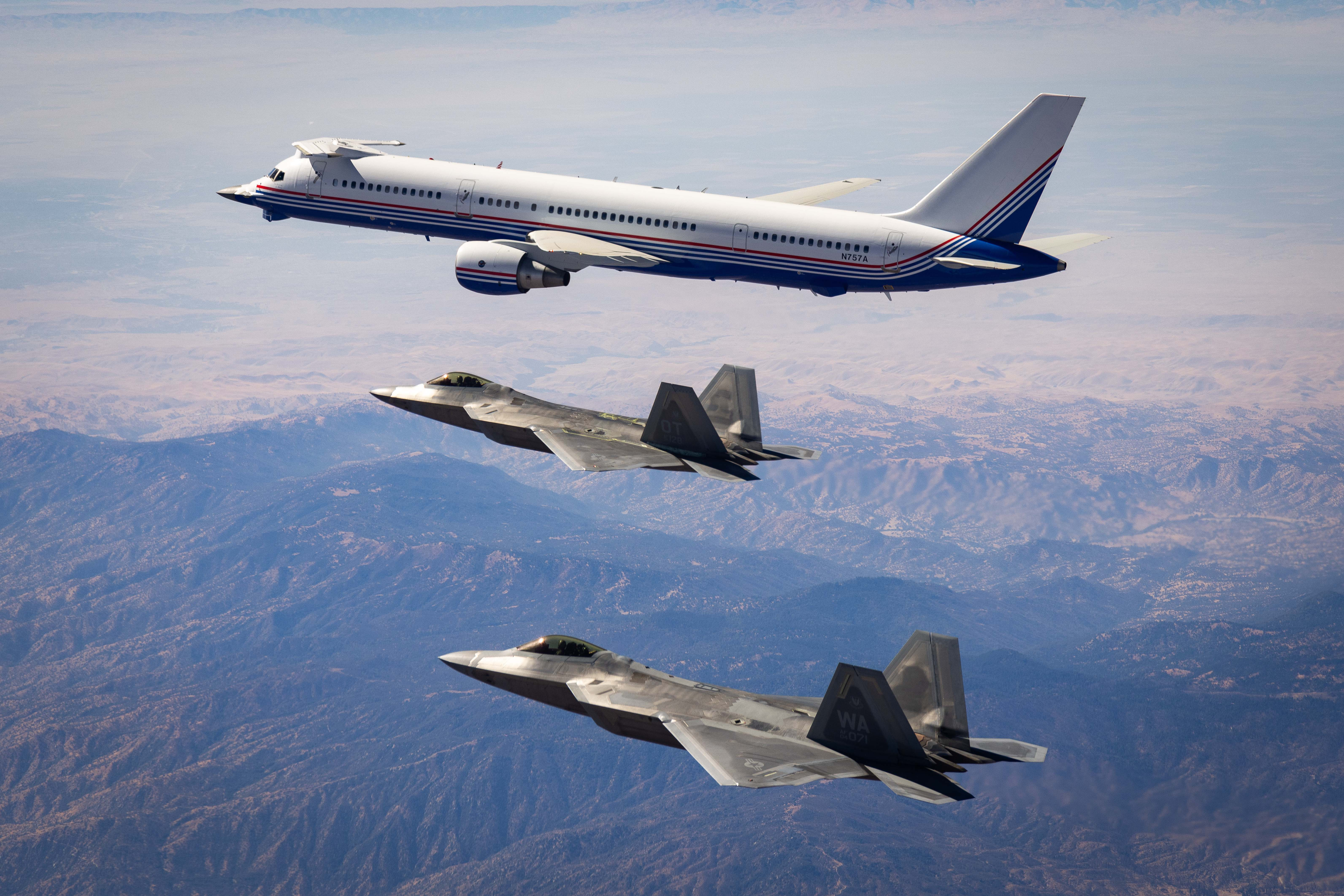
F-22s fly in formation with the 757 FTB near Edwards AFB

Additional upgrades being tested include new sensors and antennas, integration of new weapons including the AIM-260 JATM, and reliability improvements such as more durable stealth coatings; the dedicated infrared search and track (IRST), originally deleted during Dem/Val, is one of the sensors added. Other developments include all-aspect IRST functionality for the Missile Launch Detector (MLD), (Note: All-aspect IRST functionality, called Infrared Defensive System (IRDS), is being developed for the F-22, with updated sensors called TacIRST.) manned-unmanned teaming (MUM-T) capability with uncrewed collaborative combat aircraft (CCA) or "loyal wingmen", and integration of the Gentex/Raytheon (later Thales USA) Scorpion helmet-mounted display (HMD). (Note: The original plan to integrate the Joint Helmet-Mounted Cueing System (JHMCS) was deferred due to costs and technical difficulties. In 2013, the newer Scorpion HMD was successfully tested on the F-22, but it was initially not deployed due to funding cuts.) To preserve the aircraft's stealth while enabling additional payload and fuel capacity, stealthy external carriage has been investigated since the early 2000s, with a low drag, low-observable external tank and pylon under development to increase stealthy combat radius. The F-22 has also been used as a platform to test and apply technologies from the NGAD program.

Not all proposed upgrades have been implemented. The planned Multifunction Advanced Data Link (MADL) integration was cut due to development delays and lack of proliferation. While Block 20 aircraft from Lot 3 onwards have been upgraded to Block 30/35 under the Common Configuration Plan, Lockheed Martin in 2017 had also proposed upgrading all remaining Block 20 training aircraft to Block 30/35 as well to increase numbers available for combat; this was not pursued due to other budget priorities.

Aside from modernizations, the F-22's structural design and construction was improved over the course of the production run; for instance, aircraft from Lot 3 onwards had improved stabilators built by Vought. The fleet underwent a $350 million "structures repair/retrofit program" (SRP) to resolve problems identified during testing as well as address improper titanium heat treatment in the parts of early batches. By January 2021, all aircraft had gone through the SRP to ensure full service lives for the entire fleet. The F-22 has also been used to test and qualify alternative fuels, including a synthetic jet fuel consisting of a 50/50 mix of JP-8 and a Fischer–Tropsch process-produced, natural gas-based fuel in August 2008, and a 50% mixture of biofuel derived from camelina in March 2011.

== Design ==
=== Overview ===
F-22 flight demonstration video

The F-22 Raptor is a fifth-generation air superiority fighter that is considered fourth generation in stealth aircraft technology by the USAF. It is the first operational aircraft to combine supercruise, supermaneuverability, stealth, and integrated avionics (or sensor fusion) in a single weapons platform to enable it to survive and conduct missions, primarily offensive and defensive counter-air operations, in highly contested environments.

The F-22's shape combines stealth and aerodynamic performance. Planform and panel edges are aligned at common angular aspects, and the surfaces, also aligned accordingly, have continuous curvature to minimize the aircraft's radar cross-section. Its clipped diamond-like delta wings have the leading edge swept 42°, trailing edge swept −17°, a slight anhedral, and a conical camber to reduce supersonic wave drag. The shoulder-mounted wings are smoothly blended into the fuselage with four empennage surfaces and leading edge root extensions running to the caret inlets' upper edges, where the forebody chines also meet. Flight control surfaces include leading-edge flaps, flaperons, ailerons, rudders on the canted vertical stabilizers, and all-moving horizontal tails (stabilators); for air braking, the ailerons deflect up, flaperons down, and rudders outwards to increase drag. Owing to the focus on supersonic performance, area rule is applied extensively to the airplane's shape and nearly all of the fuselage volume lies ahead of the wing's trailing edge to reduce drag at supersonic speeds, with the stabilators pivoting from tail booms extending aft of the engine nozzles. Weapons are carried internally in the fuselage for stealth. The jet has a retractable tricycle landing gear and an emergency tailhook. A fire suppression system and fuel tank inerting system are installed for survivability.

The aircraft's dual Pratt & Whitney F119 augmented turbofan engines are closely spaced and incorporate rectangular two-dimensional thrust vectoring nozzles with a range of ±20 degrees in the pitch-axis; the nozzles are fully integrated into the F-22's flight controls and vehicle management system. Each engine has dual-redundant Hamilton Standard full-authority digital engine control (FADEC) and maximum thrust in the 35,000 lbf (156 kN) class. The F-22's thrust-to-weight ratio at typical combat weight is nearly at unity in maximum military power and 1.25 in full afterburner. The fixed shoulder-mounted caret inlets are offset from the forward fuselage to bypass the turbulent boundary layer and generate oblique shocks with the upper inboard corners to ensure good total pressure recovery and efficient supersonic flow compression. Maximum speed without external stores is approximately Mach 1.8 in supercruise at military/intermediate power and greater than Mach 2 with afterburners. (Note: This capability was demonstrated in 2005 when General John P. Jumper exceeded Mach 1.7 in the F-22 without afterburners. When flying at Mach 2.0 at 40,000 feet (12,000 m) in steady level flight, the F-22 is only using 118% throttle out of 150% available (with 100% being military/intermediate power and 150% being full afterburner). Time from brake release to Mach 1.7 at 60,000 feet (18,000 m) level flight is less than 3 minutes 30 seconds.) With 18,000 lb (8,165 kg) of internal fuel and an additional 8,000 lb (3,629 kg) in two 600 US gal (2,270 L) external tanks, the jet has a ferry range of over 1,600 nmi (1,840 mi; 2,960 km). The aircraft has a refueling boom receptacle centered on its spine and an auxiliary power unit embedded in the left wing root.

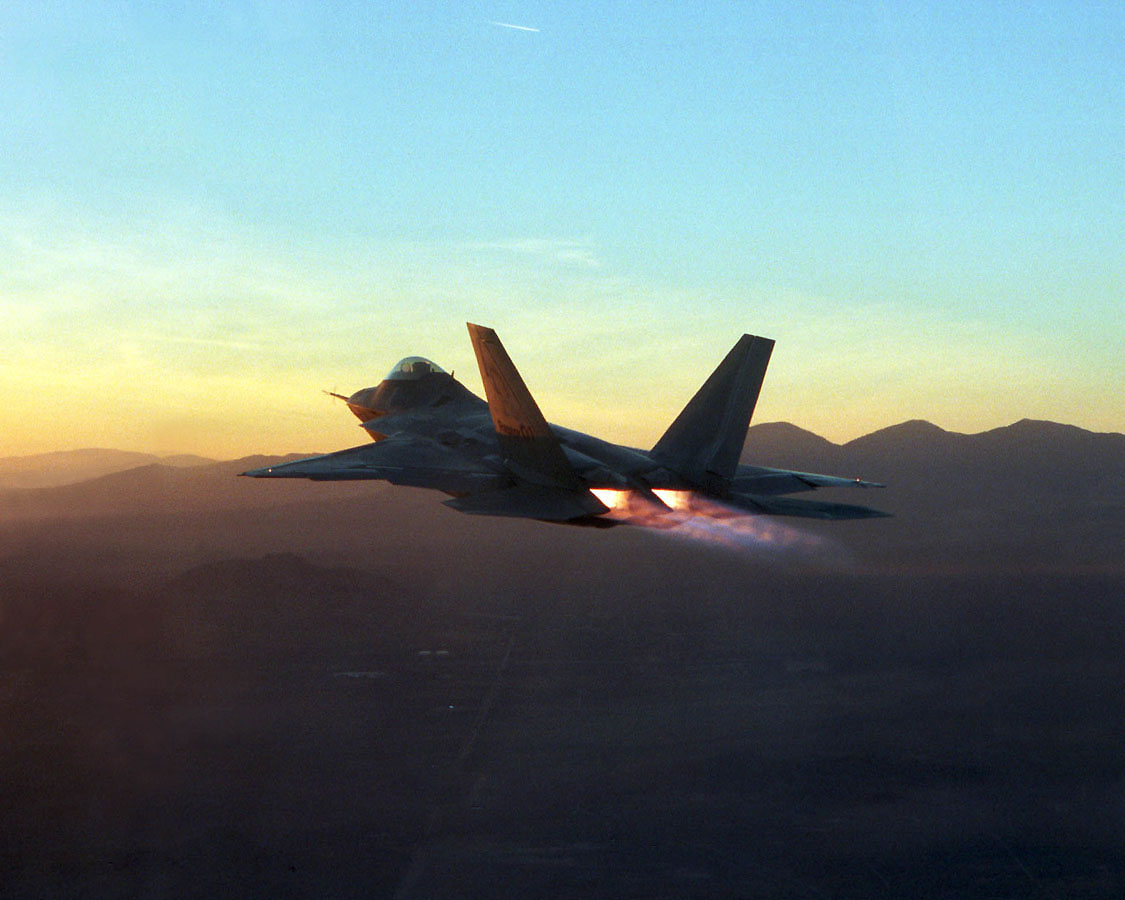
F-22 flying with its Pratt & Whitney F119 engines on full afterburner during testing

The F-22's high cruise speed and operating altitude over prior fighters improve the effectiveness of its sensors and weapon systems, and increase survivability against ground defenses such as surface-to-air missiles. Its ability to supercruise, or sustain supersonic flight without using afterburners, allows it to intercept targets that afterburner-dependent aircraft would lack the fuel to reach. The use of internal weapons bays permits the aircraft to maintain comparatively higher performance over most other combat-configured fighters due to a lack of parasitic drag from external stores. The F-22's thrust and aerodynamics enable regular combat speeds of Mach 1.5 at 50,000 feet (15,000 m), thus providing 50% greater employment range for air-to-air missiles and twice the effective range for JDAMs than with prior platforms. (Note: In testing, an F-22 cruising at Mach 1.5 at 50,000 feet (15,000 m) struck a moving target 24 miles (39 km) away with a JDAM.) Its structure contains a significant amount of high-strength materials to withstand stress and heat of sustained supersonic flight. Respectively, titanium alloys and bismaleimide/epoxy composites comprise 42% and 24% of the structural weight; the materials and multiple load path structural design also enable good ballistic survivability. (Note: The fuselage and wing structure was tested to validate survivability against 30 mm cannon fire.)

The airplane's aerodynamics, relaxed stability, and powerful thrust-vectoring engines give it excellent maneuverability and energy potential across its flight envelope, capable of 9-g maneuvers at takeoff gross weight with full internal fuel. Its large control surfaces, vortex-generating chines and LERX, and vectoring nozzles provide excellent high alpha (angle of attack) characteristics. The aircraft is capable of flying at trimmed alpha of over 60° while maintaining roll control and performing maneuvers such as the Herbst maneuver (J-turn) and Pugachev's Cobra; vortex impingement on the vertical tail fins did cause more buffeting than initially anticipated, resulting in the strengthening of the fin structure by changing the rear spar from composite to titanium. The computerized triplex-redundant fly-by-wire control system and FADEC make the aircraft highly departure-resistant and controllable, thus giving the pilot carefree handling.

=== Stealth ===
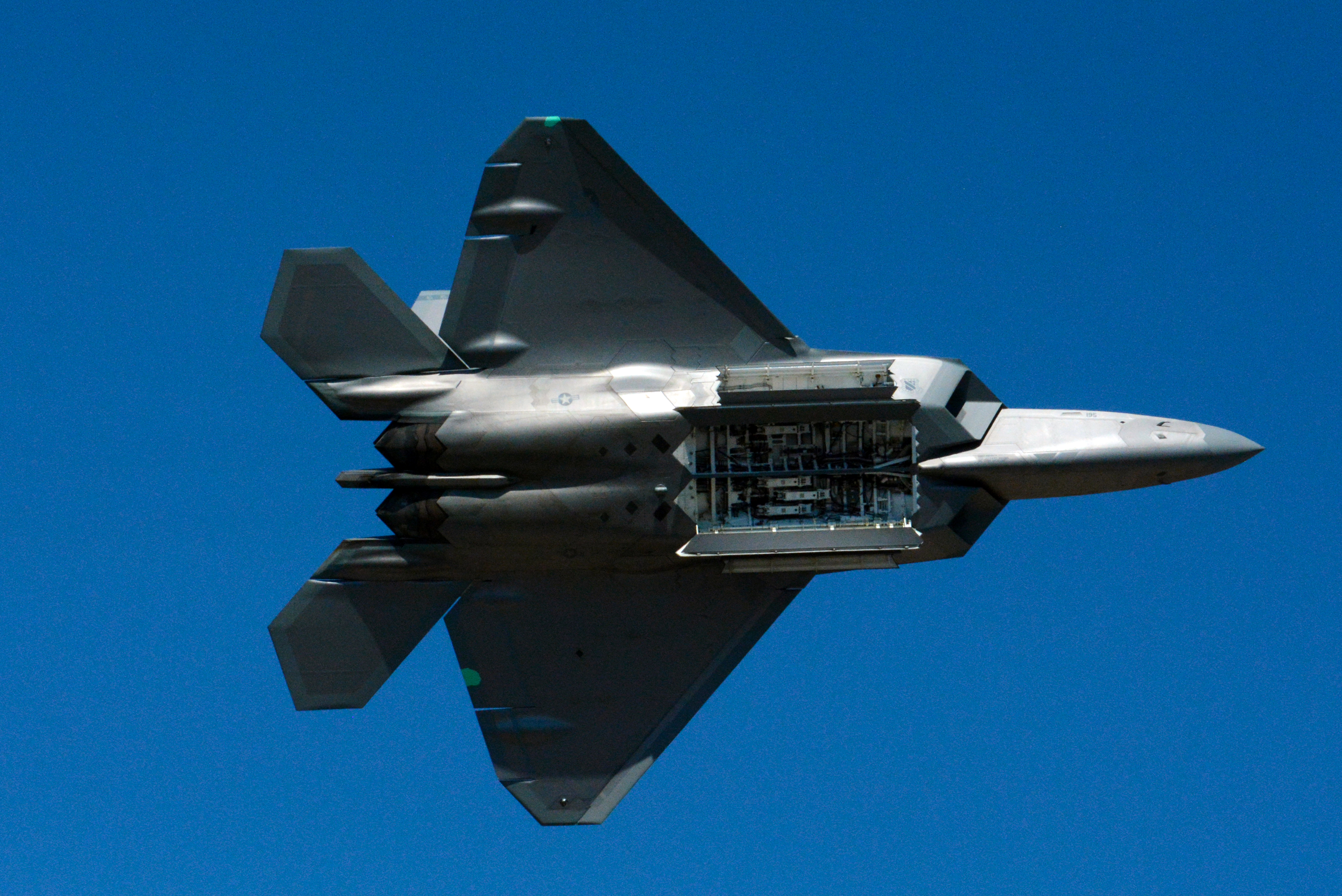
For stealth, the F-22 carries weapons in internal bays. The doors for the center and side bays are open; four LAU-142/A AMRAAM Vertical Eject Launchers (AVEL) are visible.

The F-22 was designed to be highly difficult to detect and track by radar, with radio waves reflected, scattered, or diffracted away from the emitter source towards specific sectors, or absorbed and attenuated. Measures to reduce RCS include airframe shaping such as alignment of edges and continuous curvature of surfaces, internal carriage of weapons, fixed-geometry serpentine inlet ducts and curved vanes that prevent line-of-sight of the engine fan faces and turbines from any exterior view, use of radar-absorbent material (RAM), and attention to detail such as hinges and pilot helmets that could provide a radar return. The F-22 was also designed to have decreased radio frequency emissions, infrared signature, and acoustic signature, as well as reduced visibility to the naked eye. The aircraft's rectangular thrust-vectoring nozzles flatten the exhaust plume and facilitate its mixing with ambient air through shed vortices, which reduces infrared emissions to mitigate the threat of infrared homing ("heat seeking") surface-to-air or air-to-air missiles. Additional measures to reduce the infrared signature include special topcoat and active cooling to manage the heat buildup from supersonic flight.

Compared to previous stealth designs, the F-22 is less reliant on RAM, which are maintenance-intensive and susceptible to adverse weather conditions, and can undergo repairs on the flight line or in a normal hangar without climate control. The F-22 incorporates a Signature Assessment System, which delivers warnings when the radar signature is degraded and necessitates repair. While the F-22's exact RCS is classified, in 2009 Lockheed Martin released information indicating that from certain angles the airplane has an RCS of 0.0001 m^{2} or −40 dBsm – equivalent to the radar reflection of a honeybee; the aircraft can mount a Luneburg lens reflector to mask its RCS. For missions where stealth is required, the mission capable rate is 62–70%. (Note: "... noting that Raptors are ready for a mission around 62 percent of the time, if its low-observable requirements are met (DAILY, 20 November). Reliability goes up above 70 percent for missions with lower stealth demands.") Beginning in 2021, the F-22 has been seen testing a new chrome-like surface coating, speculated to help reduce the F-22's detectability by infrared tracking systems.

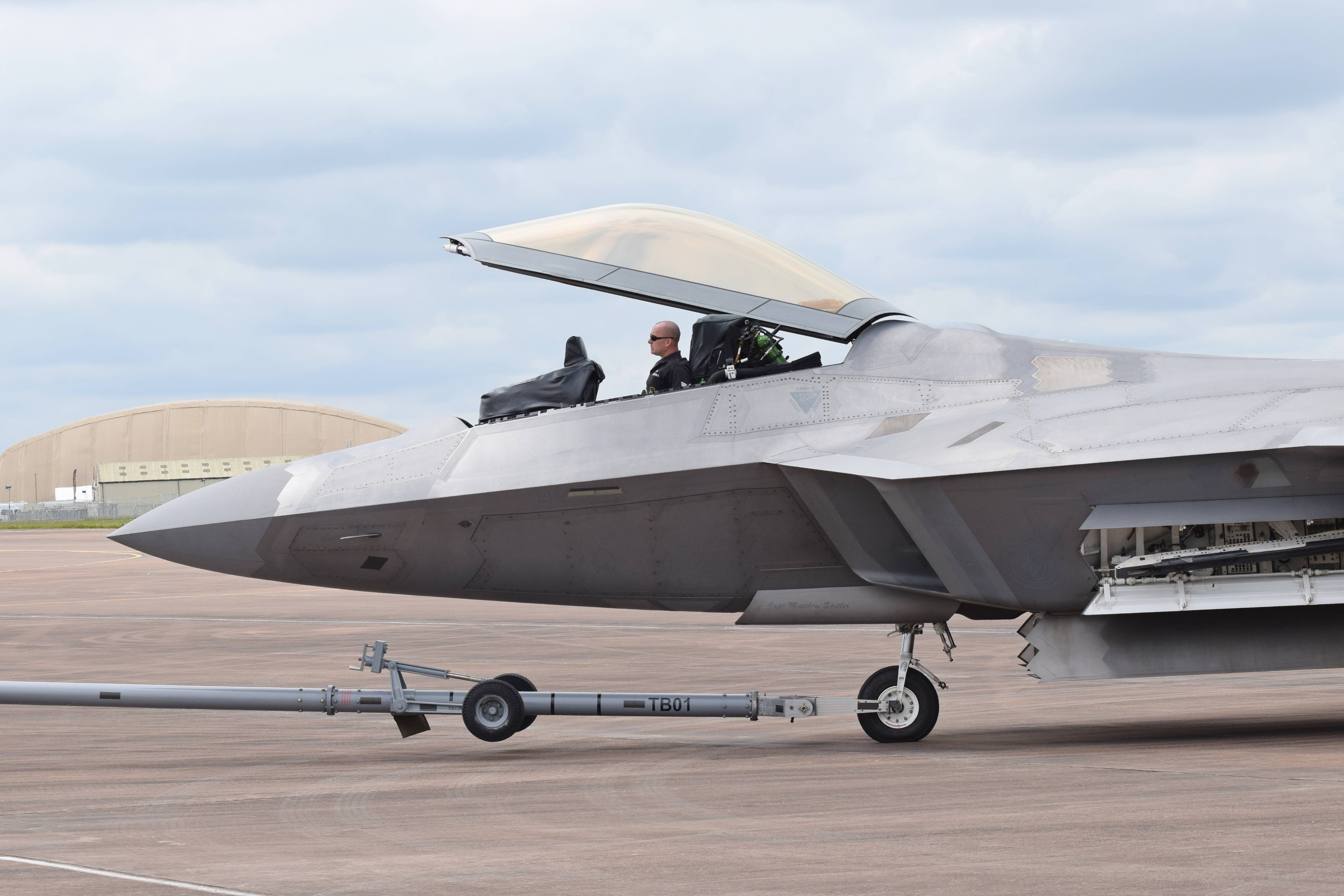
Front fuselage detail of an F-22

The effectiveness of the stealth characteristics is difficult to gauge. The RCS value is a restrictive measurement of the aircraft's frontal or side area from the perspective of a static radar. When an aircraft maneuvers, it exposes a completely different set of angles and surface area, potentially increasing radar observability. Furthermore, the F-22's stealth contouring and radar-absorbent materials are chiefly effective against high-frequency radars, usually found on other aircraft. The effects of Rayleigh scattering and resonance mean that low-frequency radars such as weather radars and early-warning radars are more likely to detect the F-22 due to its physical size. These are also conspicuous, susceptible to clutter, and have low precision. Additionally, while faint or fleeting radar contacts make defenders aware that a stealth aircraft is present, reliably vectoring interception to attack the aircraft is much more challenging.

=== Avionics ===
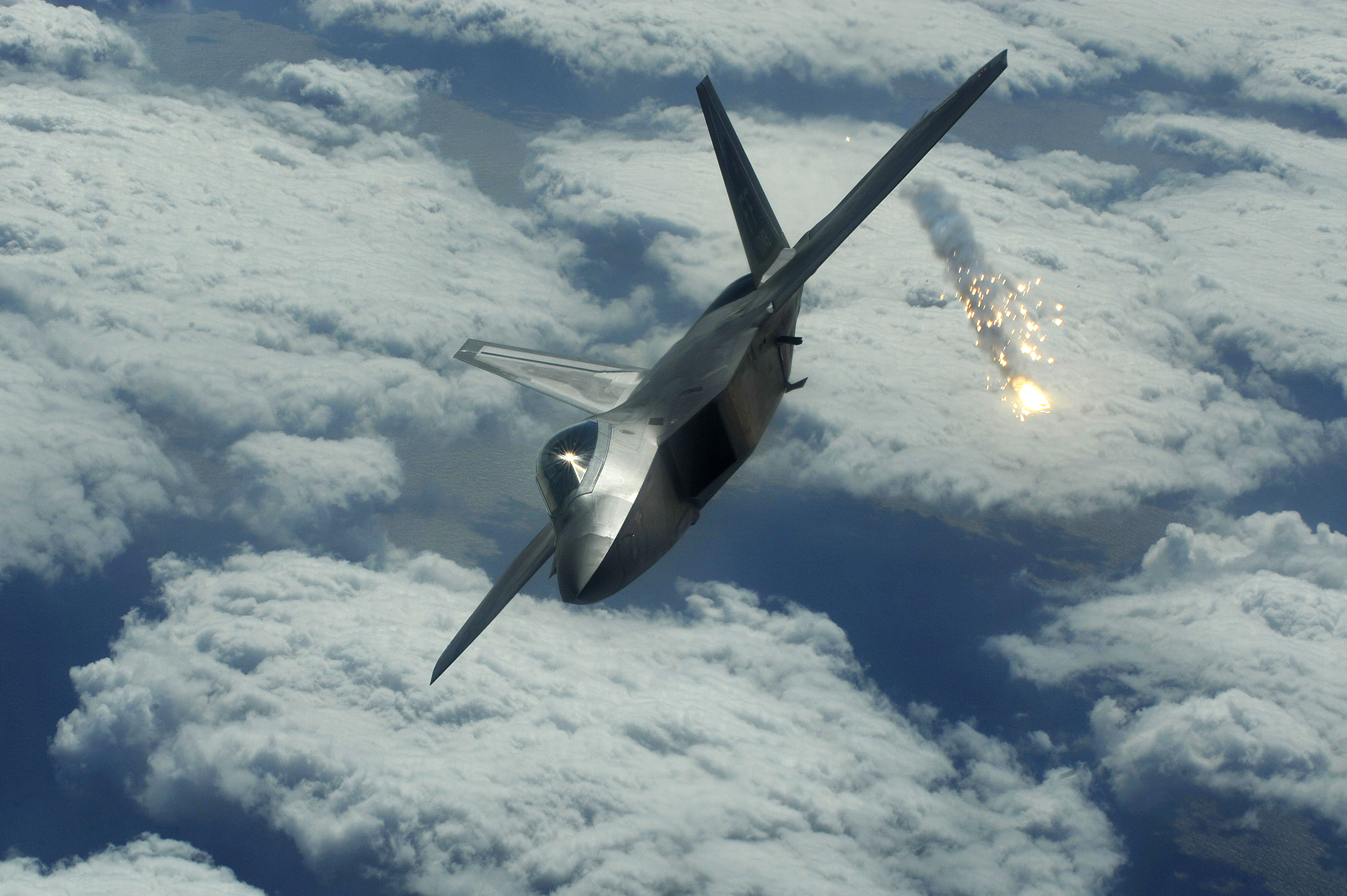
An F-22 releases a flare during a training flight

The aircraft has an integrated avionics system where, through sensor fusion, data from all onboard sensor systems as well as off-board inputs are filtered and processed into a combined tactical picture, thus enhancing the pilot's situational awareness and reducing workload. Key mission systems include Sanders/General Electric AN/ALR-94 electronic warfare system, Martin Marietta AN/AAR-56 infrared and ultraviolet Missile Launch Detector (MLD), Westinghouse/Texas Instruments AN/APG-77 active electronically scanned array (AESA) radar, TRW AN/ASQ-220 Communication/Navigation/Identification (CNI) suite, and Raytheon advanced infrared search and track (IRST) being tested.

The APG-77 radar has a low-observable, active-aperture, electronically scanned antenna with multiple target track-while-scan in all weather conditions; the antenna is tilted back for stealth. Its emissions can be focused to overload enemy sensors as an electronic attack capability. The radar changes frequencies more than 1,000 times per second to lower interception probability and has an estimated range of 125–150 mi (201–241 km) against an 11 sq ft (1 m^{2}) target and 250 mi (400 km) or more in narrow beams. The upgraded APG-77(V)1 provides air-to-ground functionality through synthetic aperture radar (SAR) mapping, ground moving target indication/track (GMTI/GMTT), and strike modes.

The ALR-94 electronic warfare system, among the most technically complex equipment on the F-22, integrates more than 30 antennas blended into the wings and fuselage for all-round radar warning receiver (RWR) coverage and threat geolocation. It can be used as a passive detector capable of searching targets at ranges (250+ nmi) exceeding the radar's, and can provide enough information for a target lock through narrowband interleaved search-and-track (NBILST) and cue radar emissions to a narrow beam (down to 2° by 2° in azimuth and elevation). Depending on the detected threat, the defensive systems can prompt the pilot to release countermeasures such as flares or chaff. To ensure stealth in the radio frequency spectrum, the ASQ-220 CNI emissions are strictly controlled and confined to specific sectors, with tactical communication between F-22s performed using the directional Inter/Intra-Flight Data Link (IFDL). The CNI system also manages TACAN, IFF (including Mode 5), and communication through various methods such as HAVE QUICK/SATURN, SINCGARS, and later Link 16. Additional passive detection methods include the AAR-56 Missile Launch Detector, which uses six sensors to provide full spherical infrared coverage; the sensors are being updated to the TacIRST for improved detection and survivability measures. Separately, the advanced IRST, housed in a stealthy wing pod, is a narrow field-of-view sensor for long-range passive identification and targeting. The aircraft was also upgraded with an automatic ground collision avoidance system (GCAS).

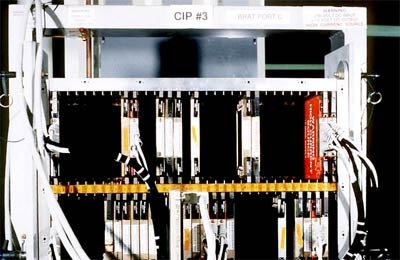
A CIP unit for the F-22

Information from radar, CNI, and other sensors is processed by two Hughes Common Integrated Processor (CIP) mission computers, each capable of processing up to 10.5 billion instructions per second. The F-22's baseline software has some 1.7 million lines of code, the majority involving the mission systems such as processing radar data. The highly integrated nature of the avionics architecture system, as well as the use of the programming language Ada, (Note: Former Secretary of the USAF Michael Wynne blamed the use of the DoD's Ada for cost overruns and delays on many military projects, including the F-22, mistakenly referring to Ada as an operating system rather than a programming language, and citing "the scramble to retain talent for ADA when careers were being made in DOS, Apple and LINUX".) has made the development and testing of upgrades challenging. To enable more rapid upgrades, the CIPs were upgraded with Curtiss-Wright open mission systems (OMS) processor modules as well as a modular open systems architecture called the Open Systems Enclave (OSE) orchestration platform to allow the avionics suite to interface with containerized software from third-party vendors.

The F-22's ability to operate close to the battlefield gives the aircraft threat detection and identification capability comparable with the RC-135 Rivet Joint, and the ability to function as a "mini-AWACS", though its radar is less powerful than those of dedicated platforms. This allows the F-22 to rapidly designate targets for allies and coordinate friendly aircraft. Although communication with other aircraft types was initially limited to voice, upgrades have enabled data to be transferred through a Battlefield Airborne Communications Node (BACN) or via JTIDS/Link 16 traffic through MIDS-JTRS. The IEEE 1394B bus developed for the F-22 was derived from the commercial IEEE 1394 "FireWire" bus system. In 2007, the F-22's radar was tested as a wireless data transceiver, transmitting data at 548 megabits per second and receiving at gigabit speed, far faster than the Link 16 system. The aircraft's radio frequency receivers provide electronic support measures (ESM) and the ability to perform intelligence, surveillance, and reconnaissance (ISR) tasks.

=== Cockpit ===
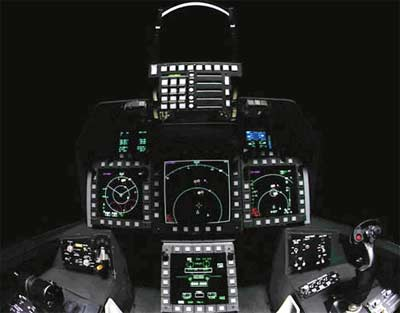
Cockpit of the F-22, showing instruments, head-up display and throttle top (lower left)

The F-22 has a glass cockpit with all-digital flight instruments. The monochrome head-up display offers a wide field of view and serves as a primary flight instrument; information is also displayed upon six color liquid-crystal display (LCD) panels. The primary flight controls are a force-sensitive side-stick controller and a pair of throttles. The USAF initially wanted to implement direct voice input (DVI) controls, but this was judged to be too technically risky and was abandoned. The canopy's dimensions are approximately 140 inches long, 45 inches wide, and 27 inches tall (355 cm × 115 cm × 69 cm) and weighs 360 pounds. The canopy was redesigned after the original design lasted an average of 331 hours instead of the required 800 hours. Although the F-22 was originally intended to have a helmet-mounted display (HMD), this was deferred during development to save costs; the aircraft is currently integrating the Scorpion HMD.

The F-22 has integrated radio functionality; the signal processing systems are virtualized rather than as a separate hardware module. The integrated control panel (ICP) is a keypad system for entering communications, navigation, and autopilot data. Two 3 in × 4 in (7.6 cm × 10.2 cm) up-front displays located around the ICP are used to display integrated caution advisory/warning (ICAW) and CNI data, and they also serve as the stand-by flight instrumentation group and fuel quantity indicator for redundancy. The stand-by flight group displays an artificial horizon, for basic instrument meteorological conditions. The 8 in × 8 in (20 cm × 20 cm) primary multi-function display (PMFD) is located under the ICP, and is used for navigation and situation assessment. Three 6.25 in × 6.25 in (15.9 cm × 15.9 cm) secondary multi-function displays are located around the PMFD for tactical information and stores management.

The ejection seat is a version of the ACES II commonly used in USAF aircraft, with a center-mounted ejection control. The F-22 has a complex life support system, which includes the onboard oxygen generation system (OBOGS), protective pilot garments, and a breathing regulator/anti-g (BRAG) valve controlling flow and pressure to the pilot's mask and garments. The pilot garments were developed under the Advanced Technology Anti-G Suit (ATAGS) project and protect against chemical/biological hazards and cold-water immersion, counter g-forces and low pressure at high altitudes, and provide thermal relief. Following a series of hypoxia-related issues, the life support system was consequently revised to include an automatic backup oxygen system and a new flight vest valve. In combat environments, the ejection seat includes a modified M4 carbine designated the GAU-5/A.

=== Armament ===
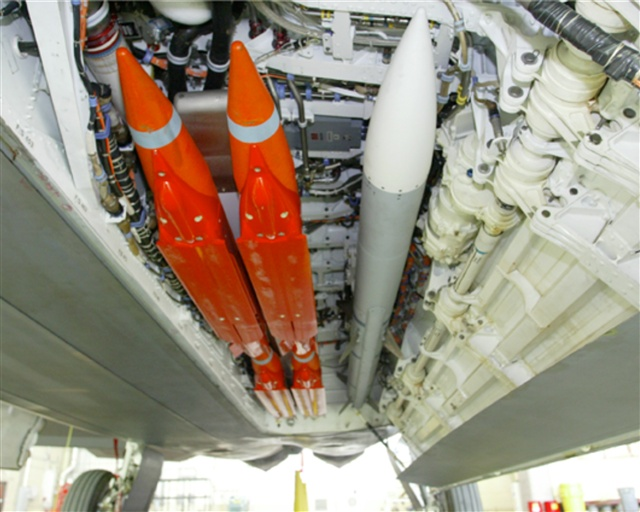
One AIM-120 AMRAAM (right) and four GBU-39 SDB (left) fitted in the main weapons bay of an F-22

The F-22 has three internal weapons bays: a large main bay on the bottom of the fuselage, and two smaller bays on the sides of the fuselage, aft of the engine inlets; a small bay for countermeasures such as flares is located behind each side bay. The main bay is split along the centerline and can accommodate six LAU-142/A launchers for beyond-visual-range (BVR) missiles, and each side bay has an LAU-141/A launcher for short-range missiles. The primary air-to-air missiles are the AIM-120 AMRAAM and the AIM-9 Sidewinder, with planned integration of the AIM-260 JATM. Missile launches require the bay doors to be open for less than a second, during which pneumatic or hydraulic arms push missiles clear of the aircraft; this is to reduce vulnerability to detection and to deploy missiles during high-speed flight. An internally mounted M61A2 Vulcan 20 mm rotary cannon is embedded in the airplane's right wing root with the muzzle covered by a retractable door, which remains closed when the cannon is not firing to minimize the negative effect the exposed muzzle has on the aircraft's radar signature. The radar projection of the cannon fire's path is displayed on the pilot's head-up display.

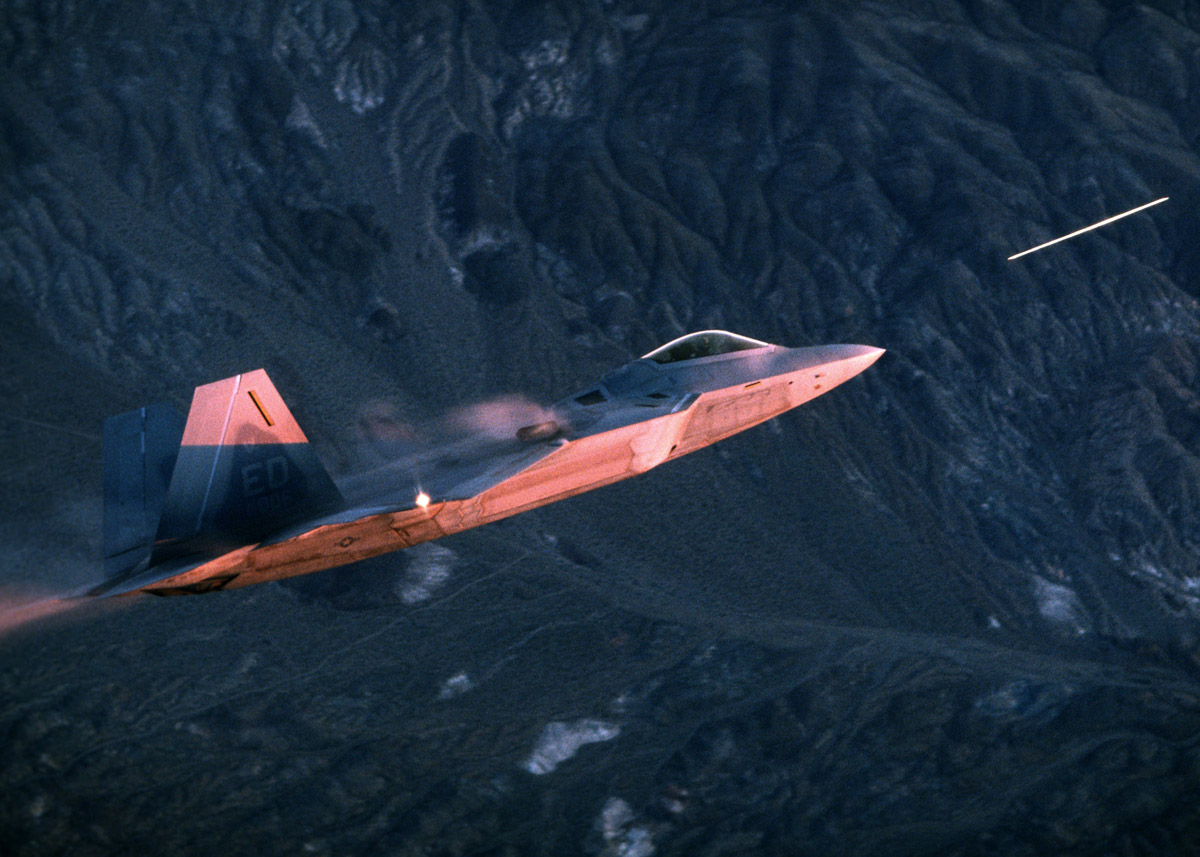
An F-22 firing its M61A2 rotary cannon

Although designed for air-to-air missiles, the main bay can replace four launchers with two bomb racks that can each carry one 1,000 lb (450 kg) or four 250 lb (110 kg) bombs for a total of 2,000 pounds (910 kg) of air-to-surface ordnance. In 2024, Lockheed Martin disclosed its proposed Mako hypersonic missile, a 1,300 lb (590 kg) weapon that can be carried internally in the F-22. While capable of carrying weapons with GPS guidance such as JDAMs and SDBs, the F-22 cannot self-designate laser-guided weapons.

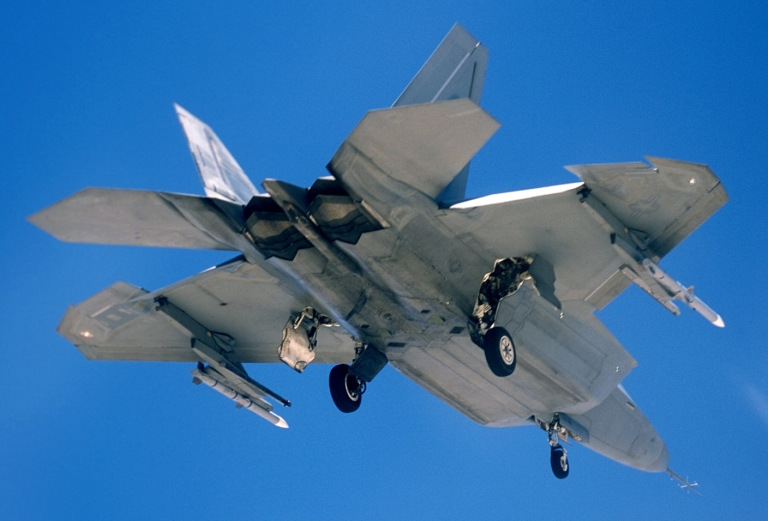
F-22 with external weapons pylons

While the F-22 typically carries weapons internally, the wings include four hardpoints, each rated to handle 5,000 lb (2,300 kg). Each hardpoint can accommodate a pylon that can carry a detachable 600-gallon (2,270 L) external fuel tank or a launcher holding two air-to-air missiles; the two inboard hardpoints are "plumbed" for external fuel tanks. The two outboard hardpoints have since been dedicated to a pair of stealthy pods housing the IRST and mission systems. The aircraft can jettison external tanks and their pylon attachments to restore its low observable characteristics and kinematic performance.

=== Maintenance ===
Each F-22 requires a three-week packaged maintenance plan (PMP) every 300 flight hours. Its stealth coatings were designed to be more robust and weather-resistant than those of earlier stealth aircraft, yet early coatings failed against rain and moisture when F-22s were initially posted to Guam in 2009. Stealth measures account for almost one-third of maintenance, with coatings being particularly demanding. F-22 depot maintenance is performed at Ogden Air Logistics Complex at Hill AFB, Utah; considerable care is taken during maintenance due to the small fleet size and limited attrition reserve.

F-22s were available for missions 63% of the time on average in 2015, up from 40% when it was introduced in 2005. Maintenance hours per flight hour was also improved from 30 early on to 10.5 by 2009, lower than the requirement of 12; man-hours per flight hour was 43 in 2014. When introduced, the F-22 had a Mean Time Between Maintenance (MTBM) of 1.7 hours, short of the required 3.0; this rose to 3.2 hours in 2012. By fiscal year 2015, the cost per flight hour was $59,116, while the user reimbursement rate was approximately US$35,000 (~$43,415 in 2025) per flight hour in 2019.

== Operational history ==
=== Introduction into service ===
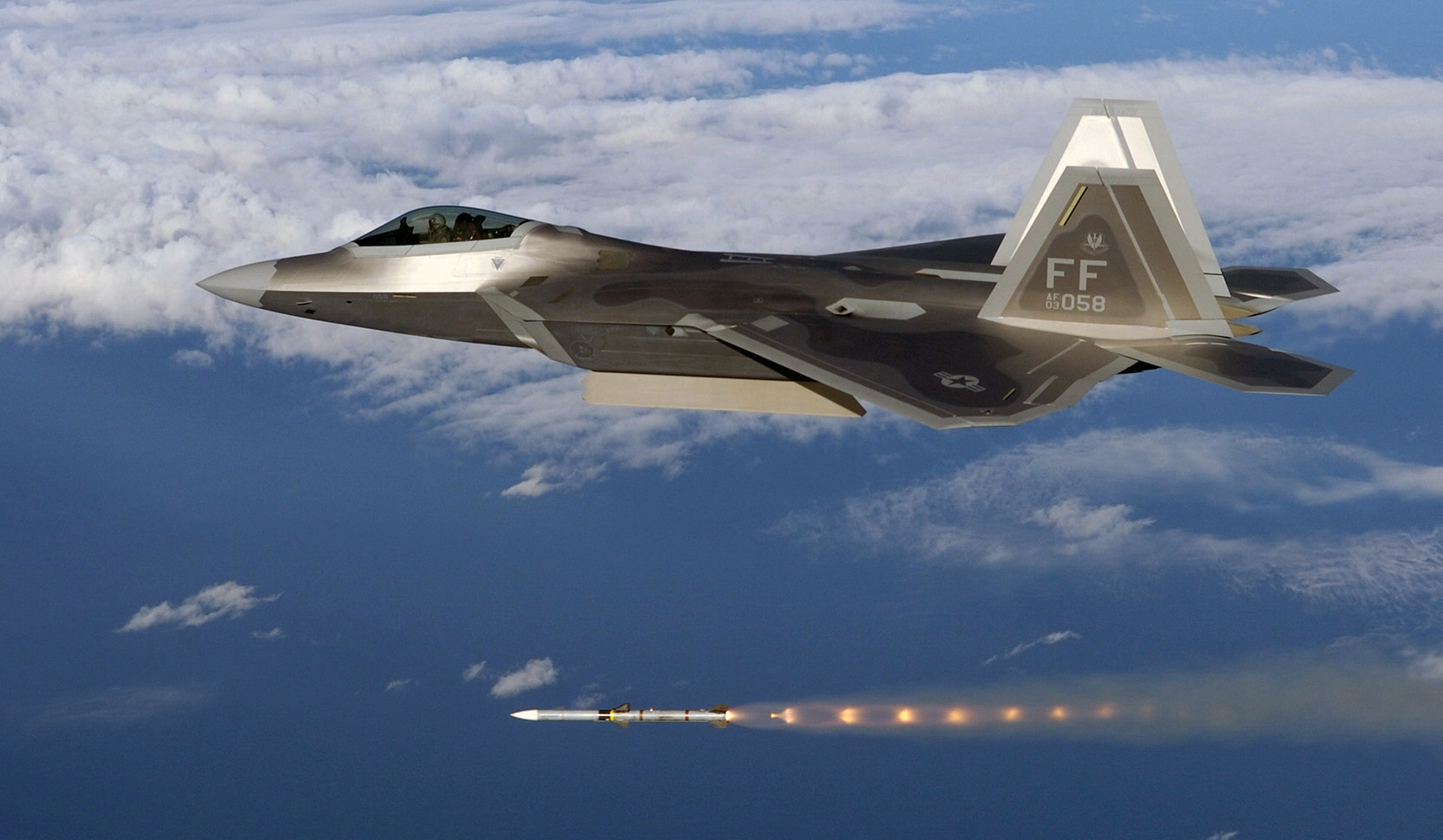
An F-22 fires an AIM-120 AMRAAM

The F-22 underwent extensive testing before its service introduction. While the first production aircraft was delivered to Edwards AFB in October 2002 for IOT&E and the first jet for the 422nd TES at Nellis AFB arrived in January 2003, IOT&E was continually pushed back from its planned start in mid-2003, with mission avionics stability being particularly challenging. (Note: In 2002–2003, the F-22's software reliability was highly inadequate, needing to initiate an avionics system restart (which took minutes to cycle) every 1.9 hours despite the requirement for "mean-time between instability events" being over 20 hours. The integrated avionics software was frequently "crashing" and requiring in-flight reboots.) Following a preliminary assessment, called OT&E Phase 1, formal IOT&E began in April 2004 and was completed in December of that year. This milestone marked the successful demonstration of the jet's air-to-air mission capability, although the jet was more maintenance intensive than expected. A Follow-On OT&E (FOT&E) in 2005 cleared the F-22's air-to-ground mission capability.

The first combat-ready F-22 of the 1st Fighter Wing arrived at Langley AFB, Virginia in January 2005, and that December, the USAF announced that the aircraft had achieved Initial Operational Capability (IOC) with the 94th Fighter Squadron. The unit subsequently participated in Exercise Northern Edge 06 in Alaska in June 2006 and Exercise Red Flag 07–2 at Nellis AFB in February 2007, where it demonstrated the F-22's greatly increased air combat capabilities when flying against Red Force Aggressor F-15s and F-16s with a simulated kill ratio of 108–0. These large force exercises also further refined the F-22's operational tactics and employment.

The F-22 achieved Full Operational Capability (FOC) in December 2007, when General John Corley of Air Combat Command (ACC) officially declared the F-22s of the integrated active duty 1st Fighter Wing and Virginia Air National Guard 192nd Fighter Wing fully operational. This was followed by an Operational Readiness Inspection (ORI) of the integrated wing in April 2008, in which it was rated "excellent" in all categories, with a simulated kill-ratio of 221–0. The fielding of the F-22 with its precision strike capability also contributed to the retirement of the F-117 from operational service in 2008, with the 49th Fighter Wing operating the F-22 for a brief period prior to a series of fleet consolidations to reduce long-term operational costs; further consolidations to improve availability and pilot training were recommended by the Government Accountability Office in 2018.

=== Training ===
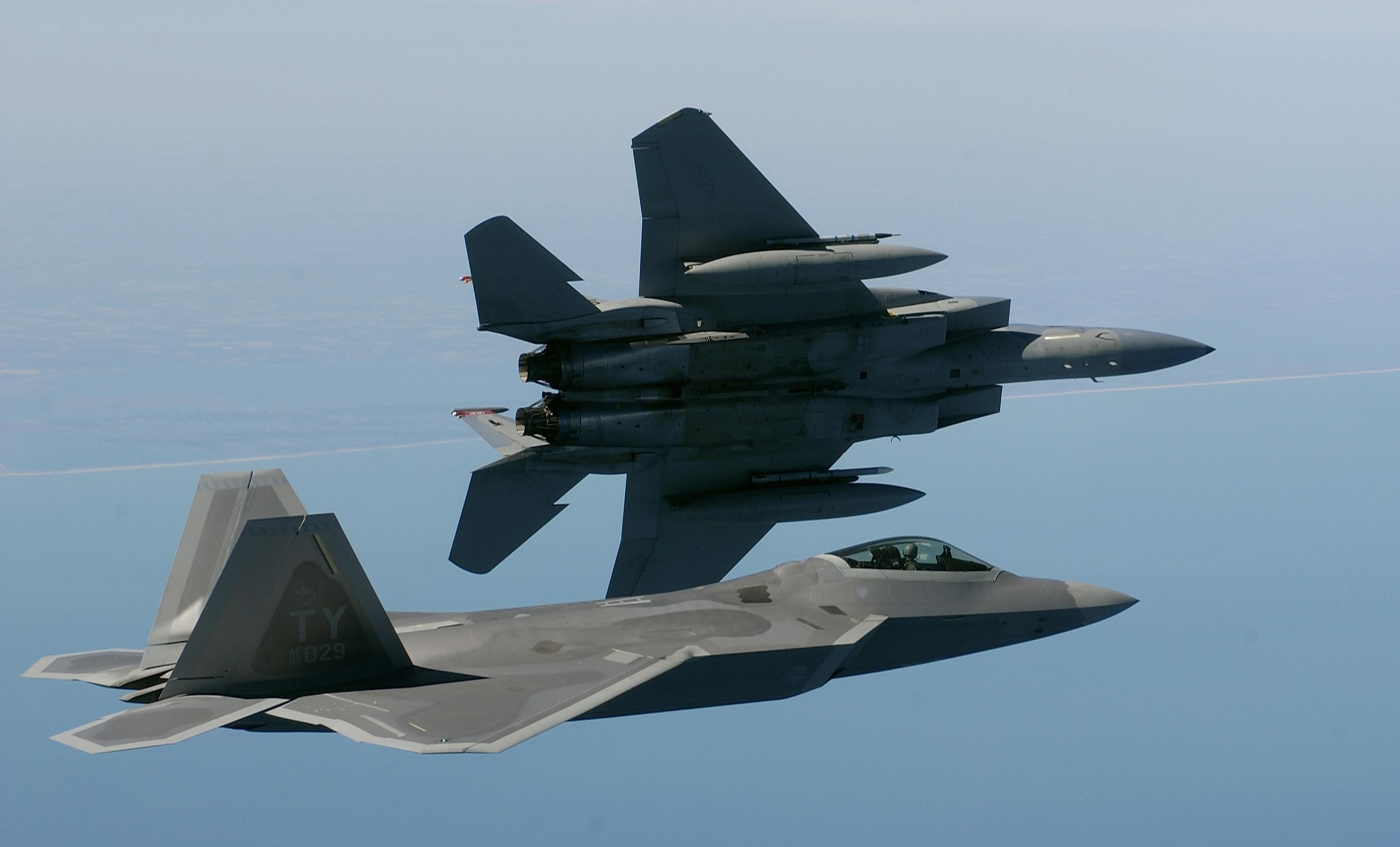
2005: An F-22 of the 43rd Fighter Squadron flies alongside an F-15 of the 27th Fighter Squadron

The 43rd Fighter Squadron was reactivated in 2002 as the F-22 Formal Training Unit (FTU) for the type's basic course at Tyndall AFB, and the first aircraft for pilot training was delivered in September 2003. Following severe damage to the installation in the wake of Hurricane Michael in 2018, the squadron and its aircraft were relocated to nearby Eglin AFB; although it was initially feared that several jets were lost due to storm damage, all were later repaired and flown out. The FTU and its aircraft were reassigned to the 71st Fighter Squadron at Langley AFB in 2023.

As of 2014, B-Course students require 38 sorties to graduate (previously 43 sorties). Track 1 course pilots, pilots retraining from other aircraft, also saw a reduction in the number of sorties needed to graduate, from 19 to 12 sorties. F-22 students are first trained on the T-38 Talon trainer aircraft. Additional pilot training takes place on the F-16 because the aging T-38 is not rated to sustain higher G-forces and lacks modern avionics. Due to a lack of a modern trainer stand-in that can accurately emulate the F-22, the Air Force often uses F-22s to supplement training, which is costly as the F-22 costs almost 10 times more than the T-38 per flight hour. The upcoming T-7 Red Hawk features modern avionics that better approximate those of the F-22 and F-35. This is scheduled to enter initial operating capability in 2027, several years behind schedule. In 2014, the Air Force stood up the 2nd Fighter Training Squadron at Tyndall AFB, which was equipped with T-38s to serve as adversary aircraft to reduce adversary training flights on the F-22s. To reduce operating costs and prolong the F-22's service life, some pilot training sorties are performed using flight simulators. The advanced F-22 weapons instructor course at USAF Weapons School is conducted by the 433rd Weapons Squadron at Nellis AFB.

=== Initial operational problems ===
During the initial years of service, F-22 pilots experienced symptoms as a result of oxygen system issues that include loss of consciousness, memory loss, emotional lability, and neurological changes, as well as lingering respiratory problems and a chronic cough; the issues resulted in a fatal mishap in 2010, a four-month grounding in 2011, and subsequent altitude and distance flight restrictions. In August 2012, the DoD found that the BRAG valve, which inflated the pilot's vest at high-g, was defective and restricted breathing, and the OBOGS (onboard oxygen generation system) unexpectedly fluctuated oxygen supply at high g. In 2005, the Raptor Aeromedical Working Group had recommended oxygen system changes that were unfunded, but received reconsideration in 2012. The F-22 CTF and 412th Aerospace Medicine Squadron eventually determined breathing restrictions as the root cause; coughing symptoms were attributed to acceleration atelectasis (Note: Atelectasis is the collapse or closure of a lung resulting in reduced or absent gas exchange.) from high g exposure and OBOGS delivering excessive oxygen concentration. The presence of toxins and particles in some ground crew was deemed unrelated. Modifications to the life support and oxygen systems, including the installation of an automatic backup, allowed altitude and distance restrictions to be lifted in April 2013.

=== Operational service ===
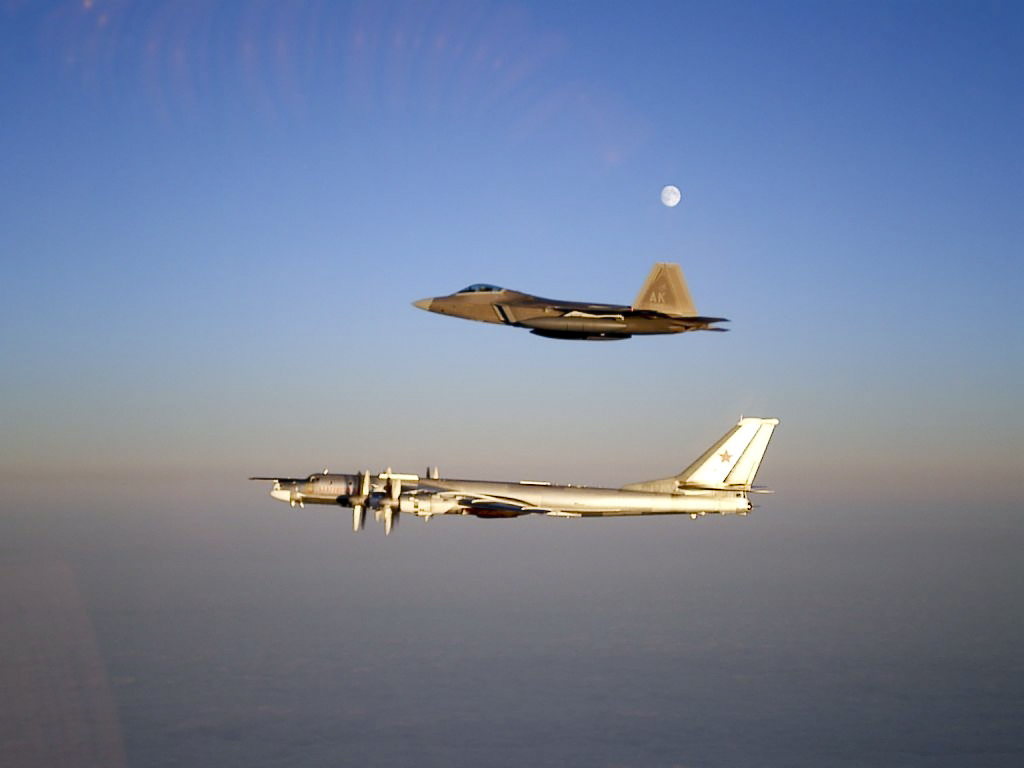
An F-22 from Elmendorf AFB, Alaska, intercepting a Russian Tupolev Tu-95 bomber near American airspace

Following IOC and large-scale exercises, the F-22 flew its first homeland defense mission in January 2007 under Operation Noble Eagle. In November 2007, F-22s of the 90th Fighter Squadron at Elmendorf AFB, Alaska, performed their first North American Aerospace Defense Command (NORAD) interception of two Russian Tu-95MS bombers. Since then, F-22s have also escorted probing Tu-160 bombers.

The F-22 was first deployed overseas in February 2007 with the 27th Fighter Squadron to Kadena Air Base in Okinawa, Japan. This first overseas deployment was initially marred by problems when six F-22s flying from Hickam AFB, Hawaii, experienced multiple software-related system failures while crossing the International Date Line (180th meridian of longitude). The aircraft returned to Hawaii by following tanker aircraft. Within 48 hours, the error was resolved and the journey resumed. Kadena would be a frequent rotation for F-22 units; they have also been involved in training exercises in South Korea, Malaysia, and the Philippines.

Defense Secretary Gates initially refused to deploy F-22s to the Middle East in 2007; the type made its first deployment in the region at Al Dhafra Air Base in the UAE in 2009. In April 2012, F-22s have been rotating into Al Dhafra, less than 200 miles from Iran. In March 2013, the USAF announced that an F-22 had intercepted an Iranian F-4 Phantom II that approached within 16 miles of an MQ-1 Predator flying off the Iranian coastline.

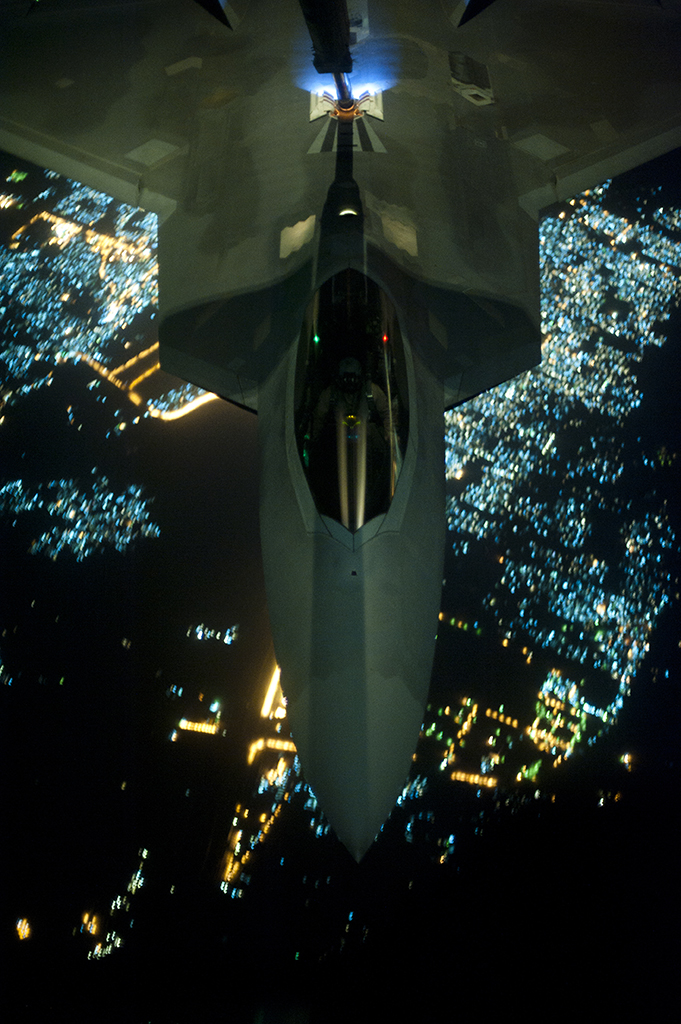
An F-22 refueling prior to combat operations in Syria, September 2014

On 22 September 2014, F-22s performed the type's first combat sorties by conducting some of the opening strikes of Operation Inherent Resolve, the American-led intervention in Syria; aircraft dropped 1,000-pound GPS-guided bombs on Islamic State targets near Tishrin Dam. Between September 2014 and July 2015, F-22s flew 204 sorties over Syria, dropping 270 bombs at some 60 locations. Throughout their deployment, F-22s conducted close air support (CAS) and also deterred Syrian, Iranian, and Russian aircraft from attacking U.S.-backed Kurdish forces and disrupting U.S. operations in the region. F-22s also participated in the U.S. strikes that defeated pro-Assad and Russian Wagner Group paramilitary forces near Khasham in eastern Syria on 7 February 2018. These strikes notwithstanding, the F-22's main role in the operation was conducting intelligence, surveillance and reconnaissance. The aircraft also performed missions in other regions of the Middle East; in November 2017, F-22s operating alongside B-52s bombed opium production and storage facilities in Taliban-controlled regions of Afghanistan.

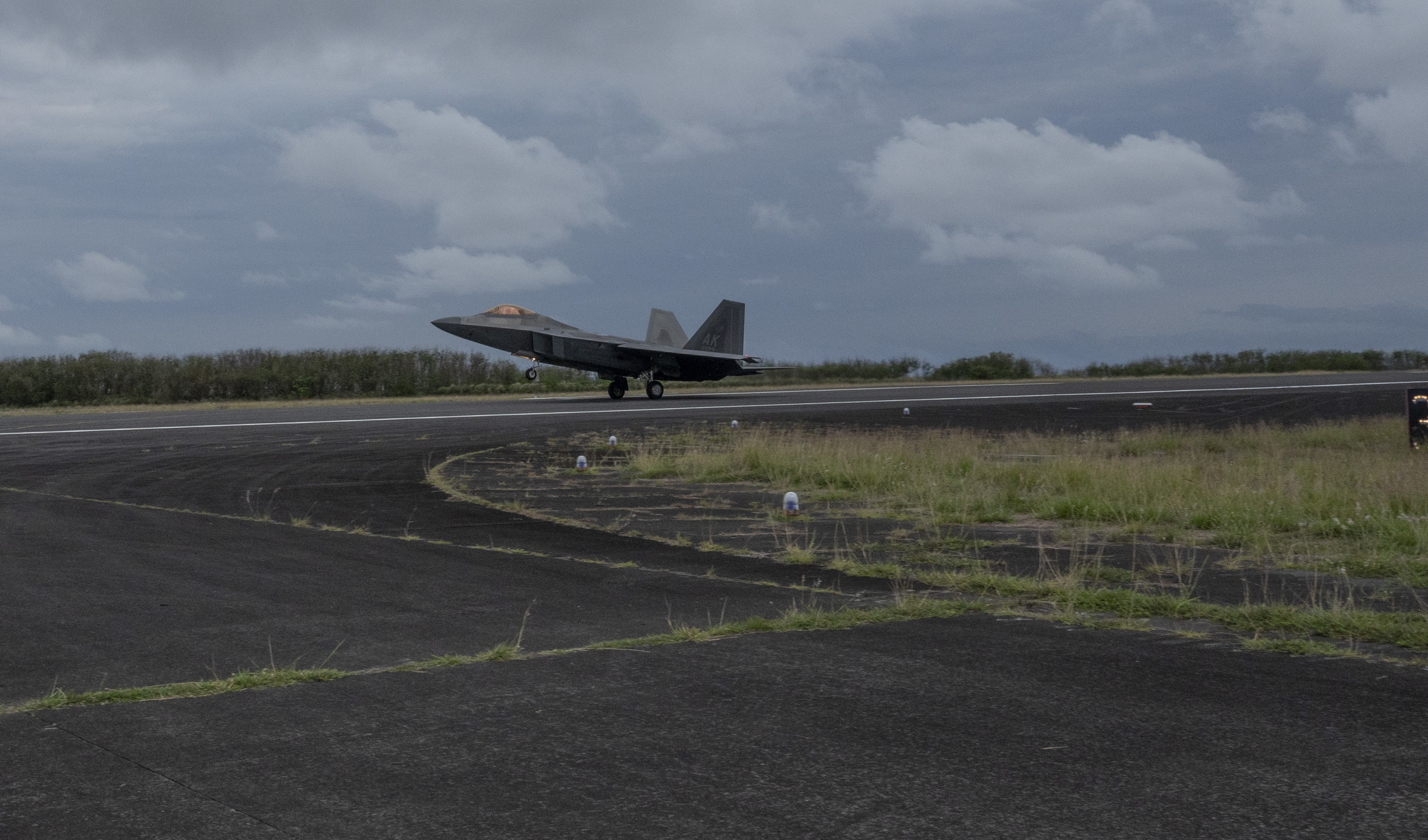
An F-22 lands on Iwo Jima (Iōtō) in April 2024 during Agile Reaper 24-1

To increase deployment responsiveness and reduce logistical footprint in a peer or near-peer conflict, the USAF developed a deployment concept called Rapid Raptor, which involves two to four F-22s and one C-17 for logistical support, first proposed in 2008 by two F-22 pilots. The goal was for the type to be able to set up and engage in combat within 24 hours in smaller and more austere environments that would enable more dispersed and survivable disposition of forces. This concept was tested at Wake Island in 2013 and Guam in late 2014. Four F-22s were deployed to Spangdahlem Air Base in Germany, Łask Air Base in Poland, and Ämari Air Base in Estonia in August and September 2015 to further test the concept and train with NATO allies in response to the Russian annexation of Crimea in 2014. The USAF would build on the principles of Rapid Raptor and eventually integrate it into its new operational concept called Agile Combat Employment, which shifts towards distributed operations during peer conflicts; for instance, detachments of F-22s have operated from austere airfields on Tinian and Iwo Jima during exercises.

On 4 February 2023, an F-22 of the 1st Fighter Wing shot down a suspected Chinese spy balloon within visual range off the coast of South Carolina at an altitude of 60,000 to 65,000 feet (20,000 m), marking the F-22's first air-to-air kill. The wreckage landed approximately 6 miles offshore and was subsequently secured by ships of the U.S. Navy and U.S. Coast Guard. F-22s shot down additional high-altitude objects near the coast of Alaska on 10 February and over Yukon on 11 February.

According to US officials, F-22s and F-35As launched from land bases in the Middle East were used to attempt to draw surface-to-air missile fire ahead of B-2 bombing runs during the United States strikes on Iranian nuclear sites on 22 June 2025.

In January 2026, F-22s along with F-35s, B-1s, F/A-18s, E/A-18s alongside various intelligence, surveillance, and reconnaissance aircraft; and numerous drones were used to dismantle and disable the air defense systems in Venezuela to ensure the safe passage of the helicopters into the target area. The operation resulted in the capture of Venezuelan President Nicolás Maduro.

On 28 February 2026, F-22 Raptors were deployed to Israel and participated in Operation Epic Fury, a large-scale joint US-Israeli military operation against Iran. The U.S. had deployed F-22s alongside KC-135 and KC-46 tankers to Israel in advance of the strikes. CENTCOM described it as "the largest regional concentration of American military firepower in a generation."

The USAF expects to begin retiring the F-22 in the 2030s as it gets replaced by the Next Generation Air Dominance (NGAD) sixth-generation crewed fighter, the Boeing F-47. In May 2021, Air Force Chief of Staff Charles Q. Brown Jr. said that he envisioned a reduction in the future number of fighter fleets to "four plus one": the F-22 followed by NGAD, the F-35A, the F-15E followed by F-15EX, the F-16 followed by "MR-X", and the A-10; the A-10 was later dropped from the plans due to that aircraft's accelerated retirement. In 2022, the Air Force requested that it be allowed to divest all but three of its Block 20 F-22s at Tyndall AFB. Congress denied the request to divest its 33 non-combat-coded Block 20 aircraft and passed language prohibiting the divestment through FY2026. While the Block 30/35 F-22 remains one of the USAF's top priorities and will be continually updated, the service believes the Block 20 aircraft is obsolescent and unsuitable even for training F-22 pilots and that upgrading them to Block 30/35 standards would be cost-prohibitive at $3.5 billion. In September of 2025, Lockheed Martin revealed plans to modify 35 Block 20 F-22s, used for training purposes, to combat-ready Block 30/35 F-22s.

== Variants ==
3-view drawings of the planned two-seat F-22B

F-22A
Single-seat version, was designated F/A-22A in early 2000s before reverting back to F-22A in 2005; 195 built, consisting of 8 test and 187 operational aircraft.
F-22B
Planned two-seat version with the same combat capabilities as the single-seat version, canceled in 1996 to save development costs, with test aircraft orders converted to F-22A.
Naval F-22 variant
Sometimes referred to as NATF-22 or F-22N (it was never formally designated), planned carrier-borne variant/derivative for the U.S. Navy's Navy Advanced Tactical Fighter (NATF) program. Because the NATF needed lower landing speeds than the F-22 for aircraft carrier operations while still attaining Mach 2-class speeds, the design would have incorporated variable-sweep wings; it would also have had expanded weapons carriage, including the AIM-152 AAAM, AGM-88 HARM, and AGM-84 Harpoon. The program was canceled in 1991 due to tightening budgets.

=== Proposed derivatives ===
The X-44 MANTA, or multi-axis, no-tail aircraft, was a planned experimental aircraft based on the F-22 with enhanced thrust vectoring controls and no aerodynamic surface backup. The aircraft was to be solely controlled by thrust vectoring, without featuring any rudders, ailerons, or elevators. Funding for this program was halted in 2000.

The FB-22 was proposed in the early 2000s as a supersonic stealth regional bomber for the USAF. The design went through several iterations, and the later ones would combine an F-22 fuselage with greatly enlarged delta wings and were projected to carry up to 30 Small Diameter Bombs to over 1,600 nmi (3,000 km), about twice the combat range of the F-22A. The FB-22 proposals were canceled with the 2006 Quadrennial Defense Review and subsequent developments, in lieu of a larger subsonic strategic bomber with a much greater range; this became the Next-Generation Bomber, although it would be rescoped in 2009 as the Long Range Strike Bomber resulting in the B-21 Raider.

In August 2018, Lockheed Martin proposed an F-22 derivative to the Japan Air Self-Defense Force (JASDF) for its 5th/6th generation F-X program. The design, which was later also proposed to the USAF, would combine a modified F-22 airframe with enlarged wings to increase fuel capacity and combat radius to 1,200 nmi (2,200 km) as well as the avionics and improved stealth coatings of the F-35. The proposal was ultimately not considered by the USAF or JASDF due to cost as well as existing export restrictions and industrial workshare concerns.

== Operators ==
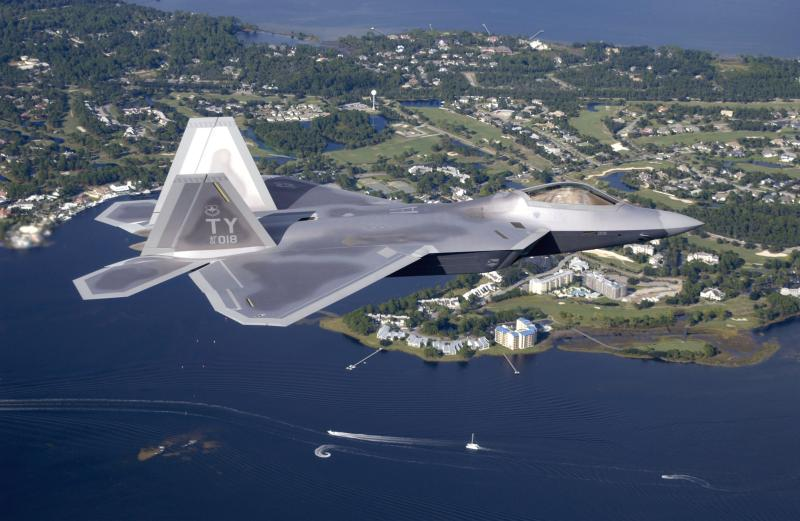
F-22 from Tyndall Air Force Base, Florida, cruising over the Florida Panhandle

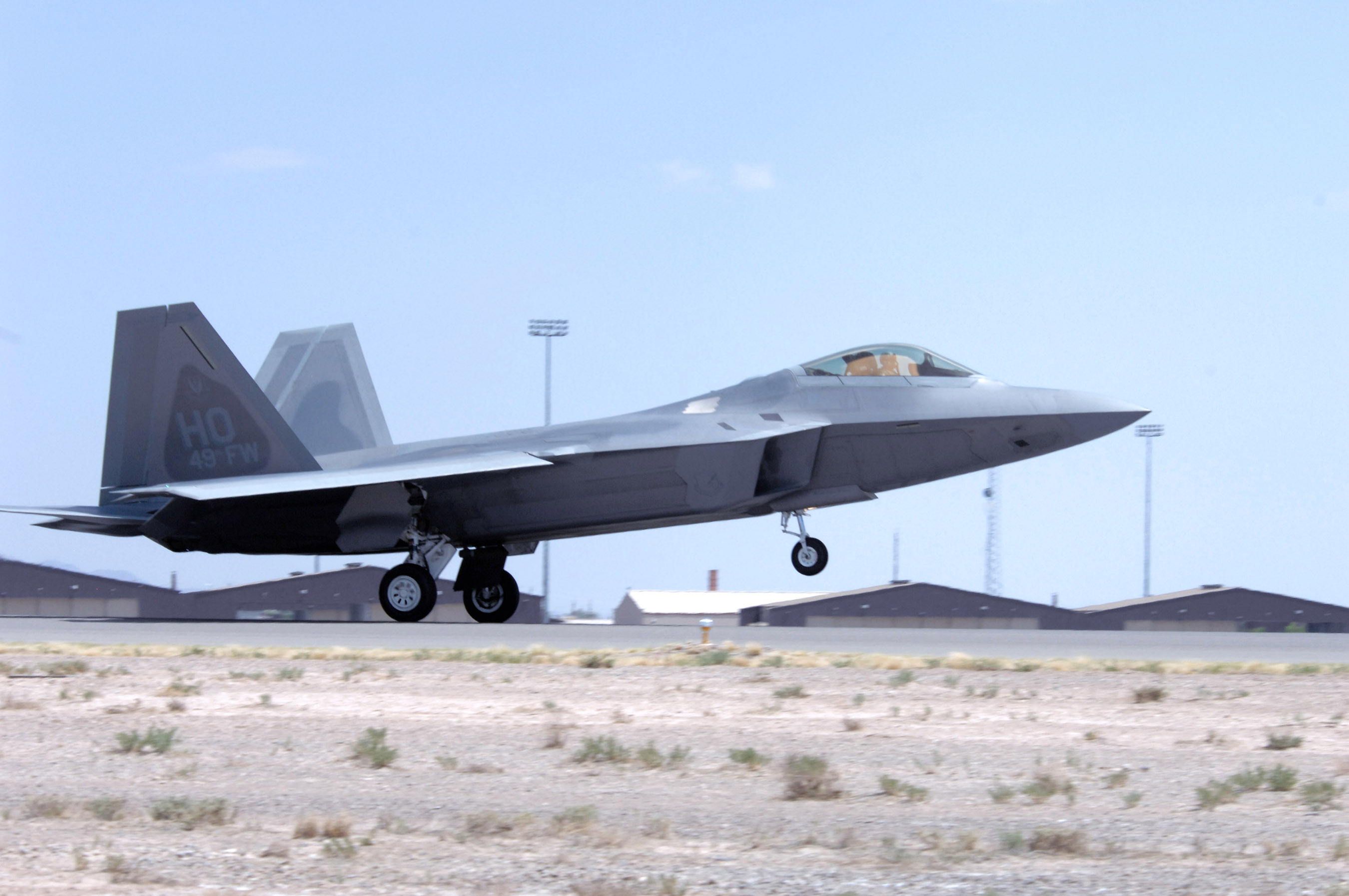
An F-22 landing at Holloman AFB, New Mexico

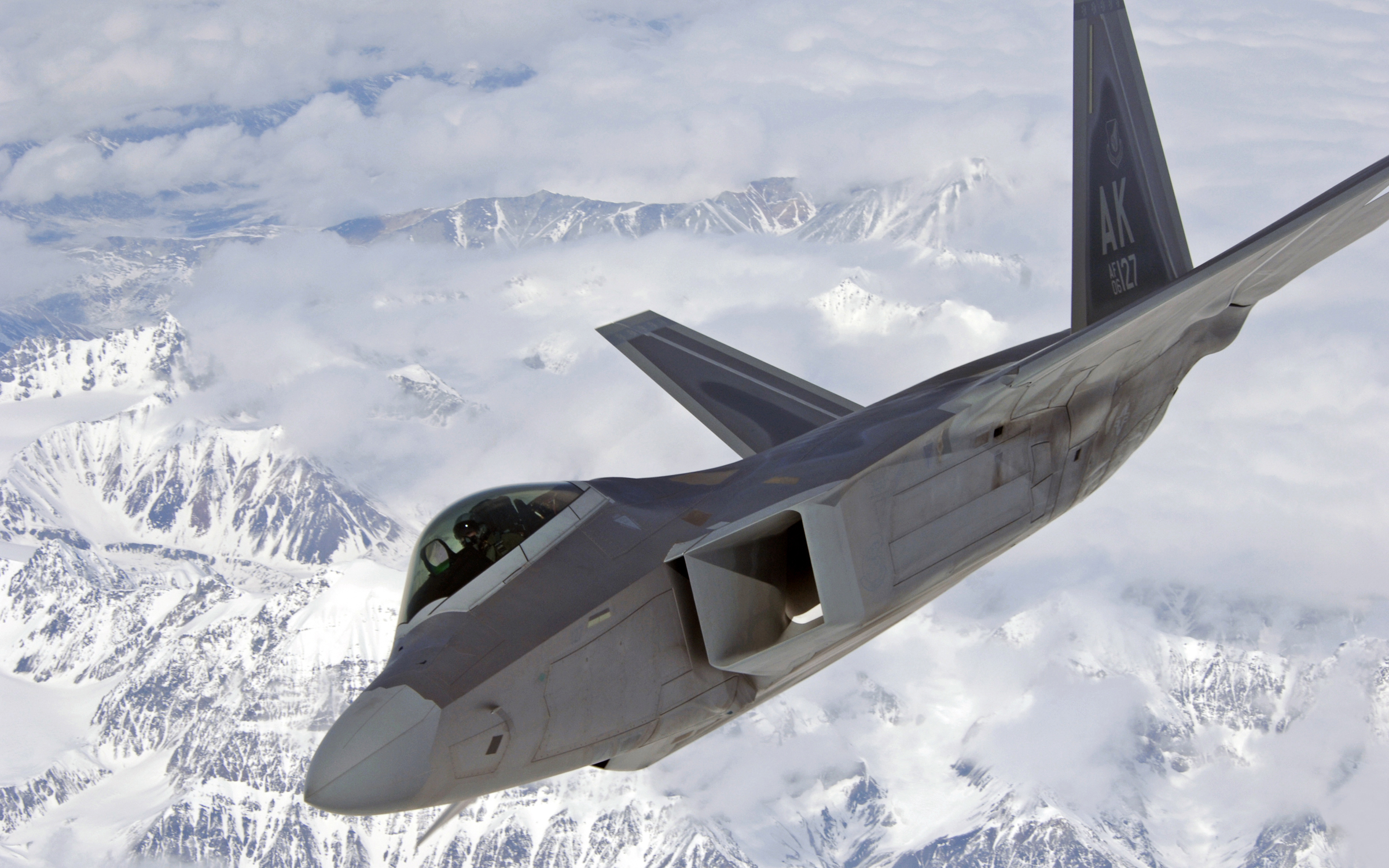
An F-22, based at Elmendorf AFB, Alaska, over mountain terrain

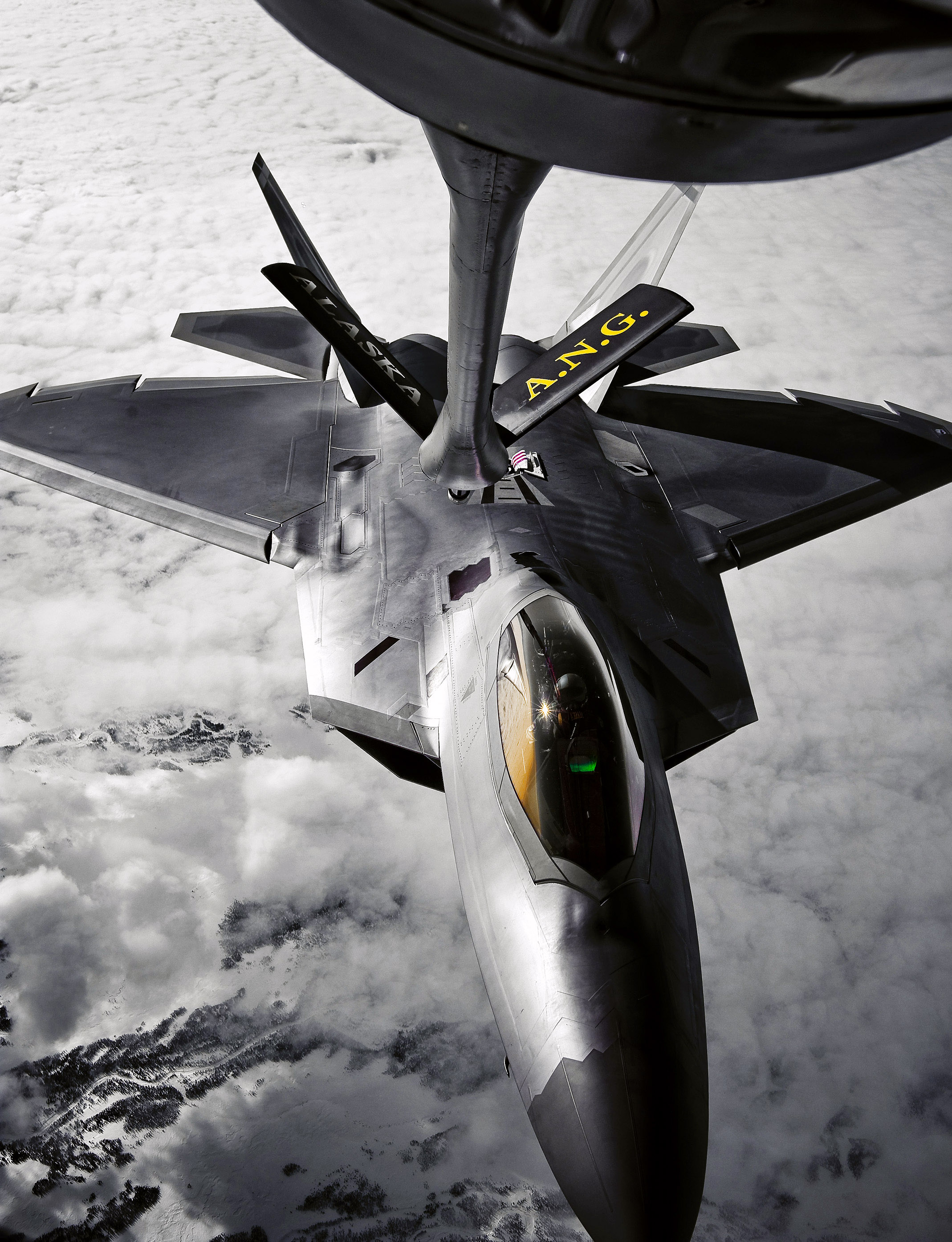
An F-22 during in-flight refueling with a tanker aircraft

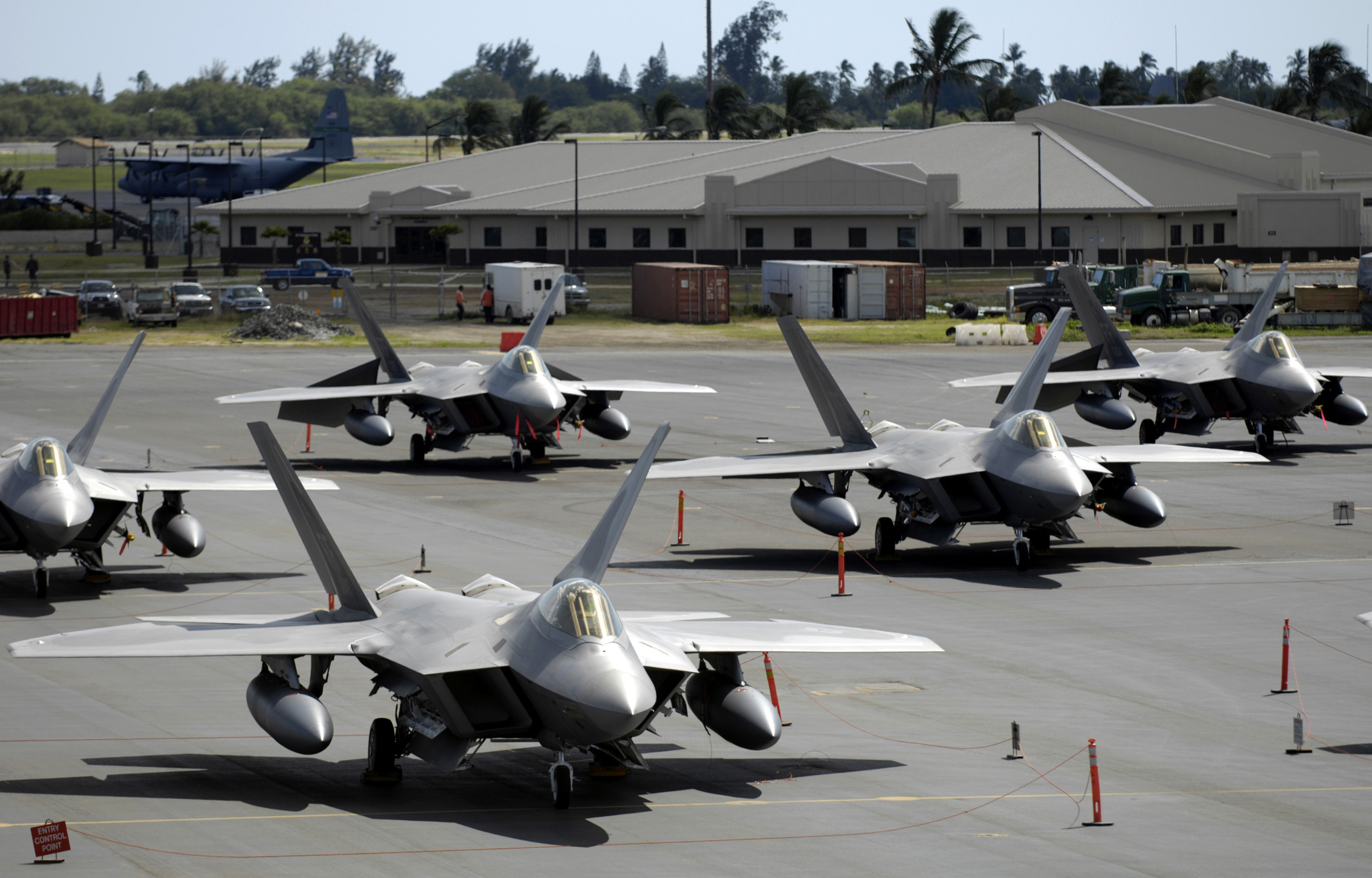
F-22 with drop tanks in transit to Kadena Air Base, Japan, from Langley AFB, Virginia

The United States Air Force is the only operator of the F-22. As of August 2022, it has 178 active aircraft in its inventory. Current units are bolded.

=== Air Combat Command ===
- **1st Fighter Wing** - Joint Base Langley–Eustis, Virginia
  - **27th Fighter Squadron**
  - **71st Fighter Squadron** (Formal Training Unit)
  - **94th Fighter Squadron**
- **53rd Wing** - Eglin Air Force Base, Florida
  - **422nd Test and Evaluation Squadron** - Nellis Air Force Base, Nevada
- **57th Wing** - Nellis Air Force Base, Nevada
  - **433rd Weapons Squadron**
- 325th Fighter Wing - Tyndall Air Force Base, Florida
  - 43rd Fighter Squadron (inactivated in 2023)
  - 95th Fighter Squadron (activated in 2013, inactivated in 2018)

=== Pacific Air Forces ===
- **3rd Wing** - Joint Base Elmendorf–Richardson, Alaska
  - **90th Fighter Squadron**
  - **525th Fighter Squadron**
- **15th Wing** - Hickam Air Force Base, Hawaii
  - **19th Fighter Squadron** (active associate unit)

=== Air National Guard ===
- **154th Wing** - Hickam Air Force Base, Hawaii
  - **199th Fighter Squadron**
- **192nd Fighter Wing** - Joint Base Langley–Eustis, Virginia
  - **149th Fighter Squadron** (associate unit)

=== Air Force Reserve Command ===
- **477th Fighter Group** – Joint Base Elmendorf–Richardson, Alaska
  - **302nd Fighter Squadron** (associate unit)

=== Air Force Materiel Command ===
- **412th Test Wing** - Edwards Air Force Base, California
  - **411th Flight Test Squadron**

== Accidents ==
The first F-22 crash occurred during takeoff at Nellis AFB on 20 December 2004, in which the pilot ejected safely before impact. The investigation revealed that a brief interruption in power during an engine shutdown prior to flight caused a flight-control system malfunction; consequently, the aircraft design was corrected to avoid the problem. Following a brief grounding, F-22 operations resumed after a review.

On 25 March 2009, an EMD F-22 crashed 35 miles (56 km) northeast of Edwards AFB during a test flight, resulting in the death of Lockheed Martin test pilot David P. Cooley. An Air Force Materiel Command investigation found that Cooley momentarily lost consciousness during a high-G maneuver, or g-LOC, then ejected when he found himself too low to recover. Cooley was killed during ejection by blunt-force trauma from windblast due to the aircraft's speed. The investigation found no design issues.

On 16 November 2010, an F-22 from Elmendorf AFB crashed, killing the pilot, Captain Jeffrey Haney. F-22s were restricted to flying below 25,000 feet, then grounded during the investigation. The crash was attributed to a bleed air system malfunction after an engine overheat condition was detected, shutting down the Environmental Control System (ECS) and OBOGS. The accident review board ruled Haney was to blame, as he did not react properly to engage the emergency oxygen system. Haney's widow sued Lockheed Martin, claiming equipment defects, and later reached a settlement. After the ruling, the emergency oxygen system engagement handle was redesigned and the entire system was eventually replaced by an automatic backup. On 11 February 2013, the DoD's Inspector General released a report stating that the USAF had erred in blaming Haney, and that facts did not sufficiently support conclusions; the USAF stated that it stood by the ruling.

On 15 November 2012, an F-22 crashed to the east of Tyndall AFB during a training mission. The pilot ejected safely and no injuries were reported on the ground. The investigation determined that a "chafed" electrical wire ignited the fluid in a hydraulic line, causing a fire that damaged the flight controls.

On 15 May 2020, an F-22 from Eglin Air Force Base crashed during a routine training mission shortly after takeoff; the pilot ejected safely. The cause of the crash was attributed to a maintenance error after an aircraft wash resulting in faulty air data sensor readings.

== Aircraft on display ==
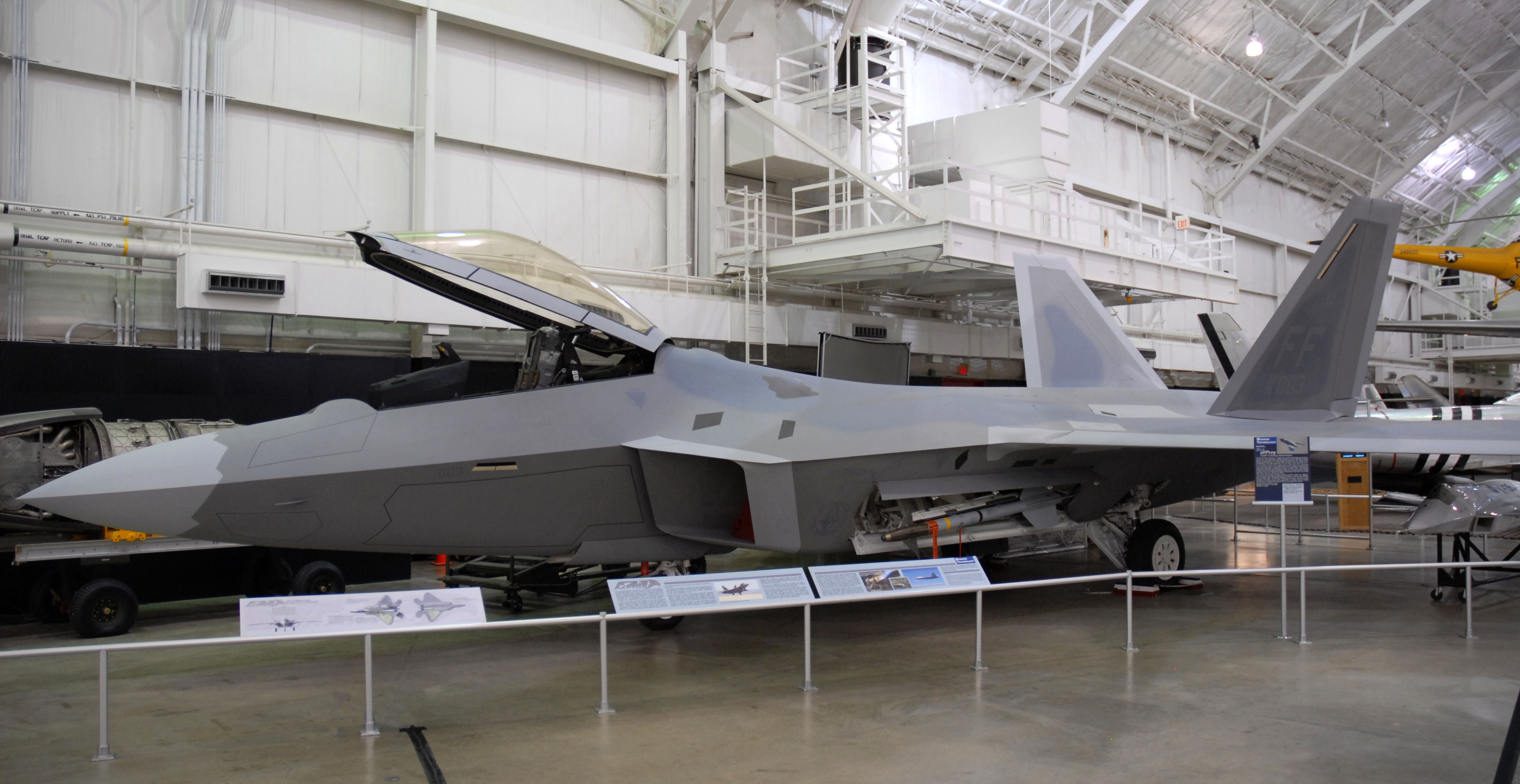
F-22A 91-4003 at the National Museum of the United States Air Force in Dayton, Ohio

- 91-4002 – Hill Aerospace Museum in Ogden, Utah
- 91-4003 – National Museum of the United States Air Force in Dayton, Ohio

== Specifications (F-22A) ==
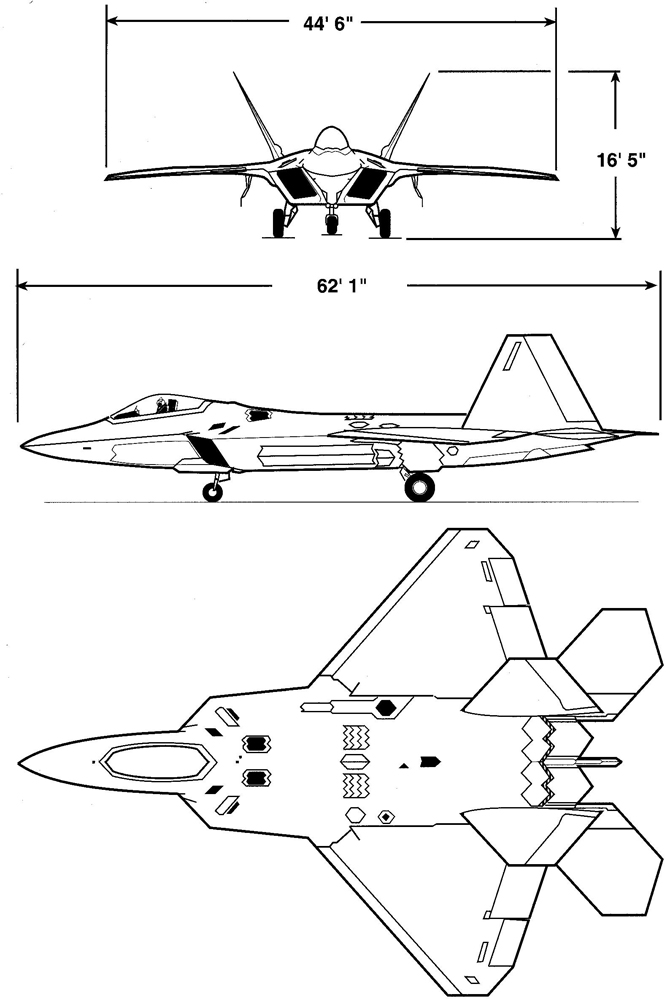
F-22 Raptor 3-view drawings

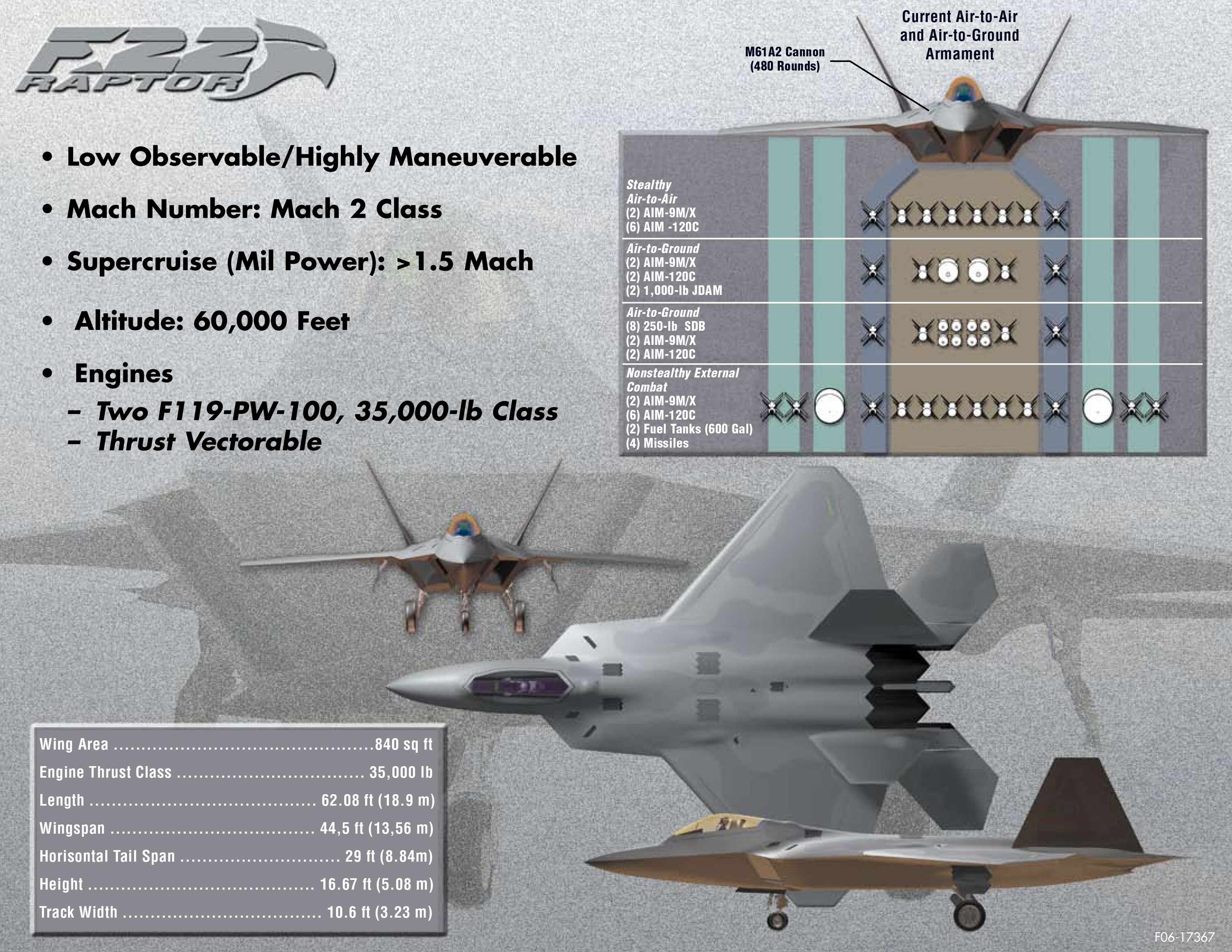
USAF poster of key F-22 features and armament

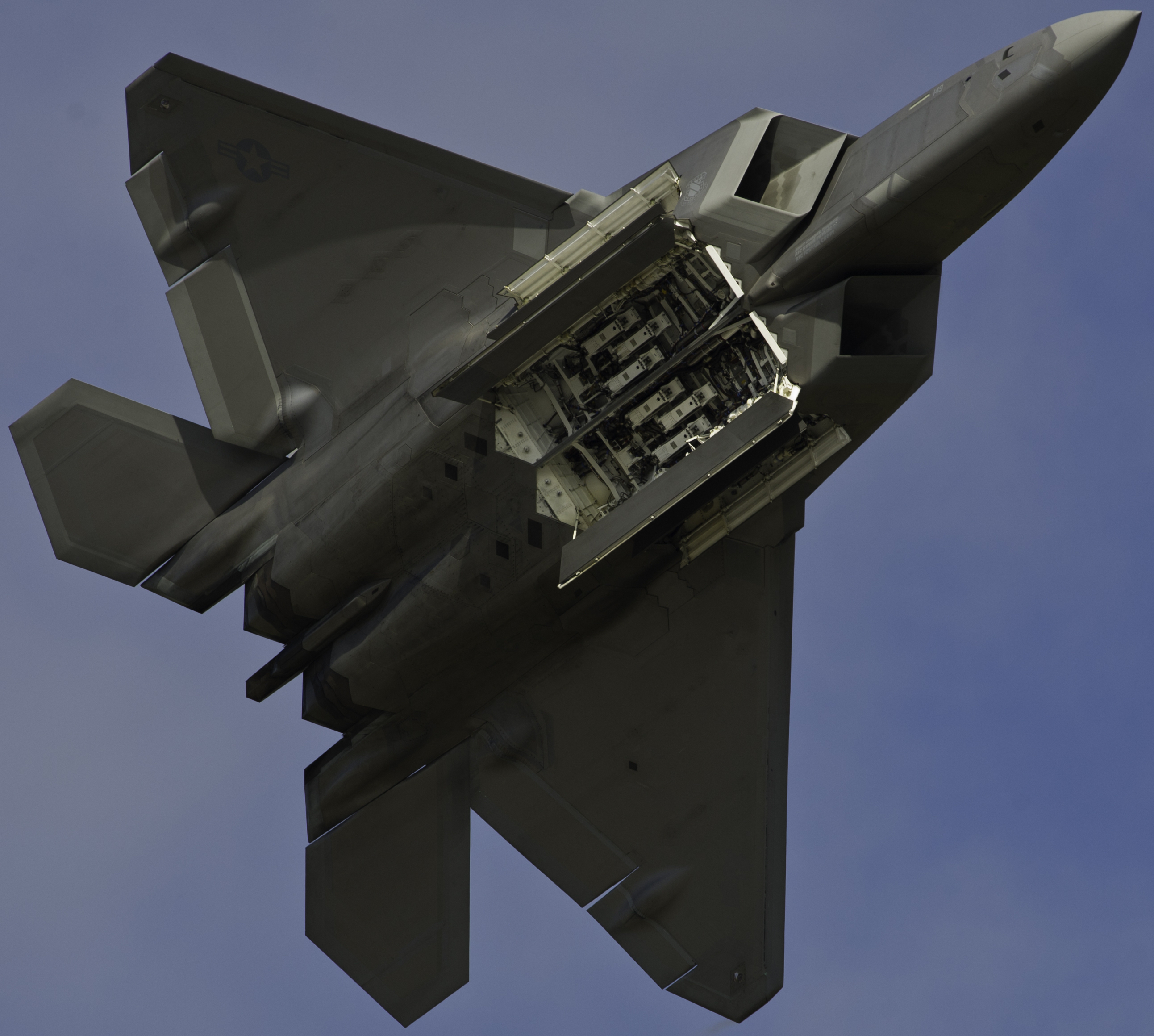
F-22's underside with main bay doors open

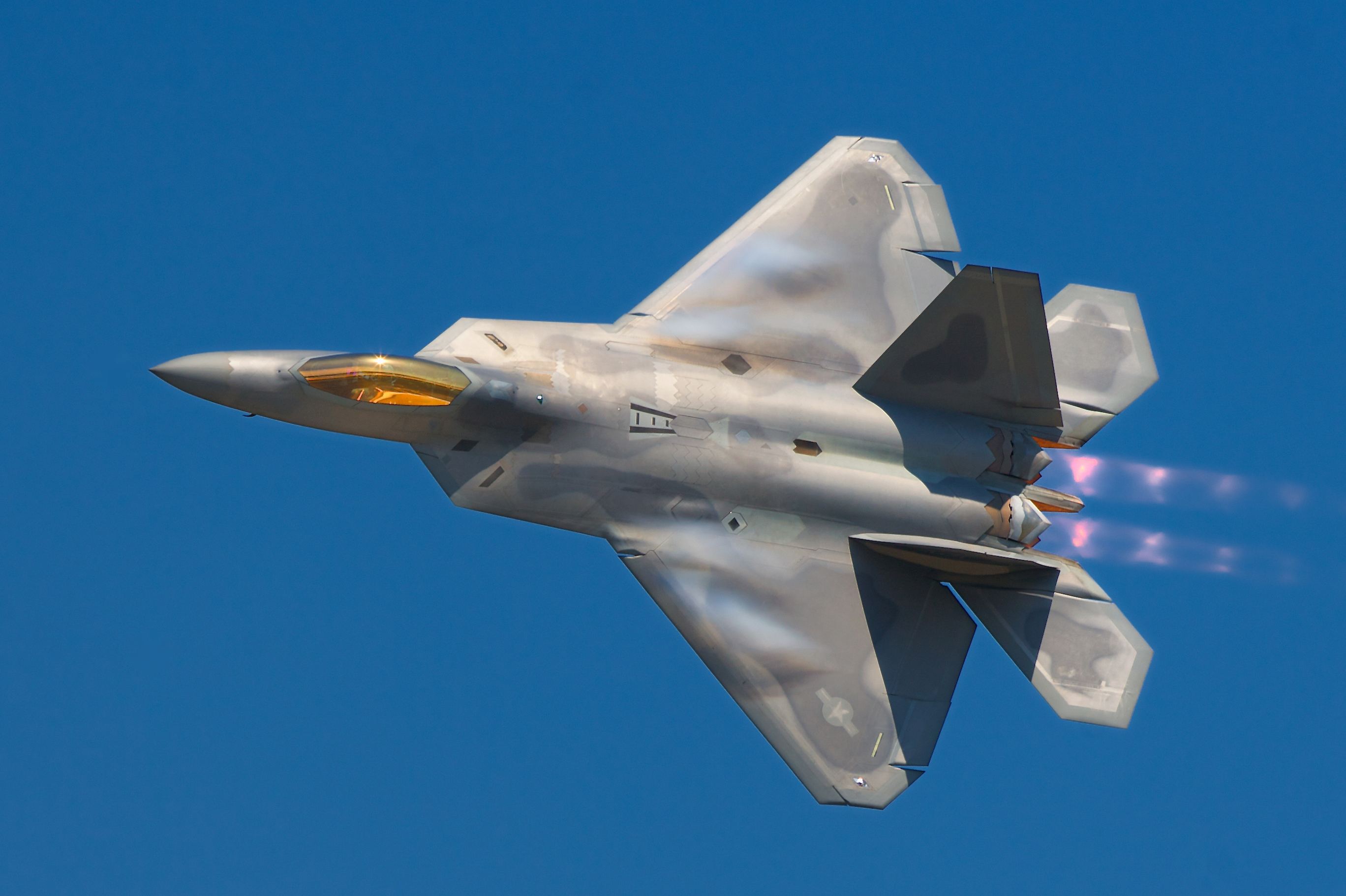
F-22's diamond-like delta wing planform

Data from USAF, manufacturers' data, Aerofax, Aviation Week, Air Forces Monthly, and Journal of Electronic Defense

General characteristics

- Crew: 1
- Length: 62 ft 1 in (18.92 m)
- Wingspan: 44 ft 6 in (13.56 m)
- Height: 16 ft 8 in (5.08 m)
- Wing area: 840 sq ft (78.04 m^{2})
- Aspect ratio: 2.36
- Airfoil: NACA 6 series airfoil
- Empty weight: 43,340 lb (19,700 kg)
- Gross weight: 64,840 lb (29,410 kg)
- Max takeoff weight: 83,500 lb (38,000 kg)
- Fuel capacity: 18,000 lb (8,200 kg) internally, or 26,000 lb (12,000 kg) with 2× 600 US gal (2,270 L) tanks
- Powerplant: 2 × Pratt & Whitney F119-PW-100 augmented turbofans, 26,000 lbf (120 kN) thrust each dry, 35,000 lbf (160 kN) with afterburner (Note: Actual thrust is up to 37,000 lbf (165 kN).)

Performance

- Maximum speed: Mach 2.25, 1,500 mph (1,303 kn; 2,414 km/h) at altitude
  - Mach 1.21, 800 knots (921 mph; 1,482 km/h) at sea level
- Supercruise: Mach 1.76, 1,162 mph (1,010 kn; 1,870 km/h) at altitude
- Range: 1,600 nmi (1,800 mi, 3,000 km) or more with 2 external fuel tanks
- Combat range: 460 nmi (530 mi, 850 km) clean with 100 nmi (115 mi; 185 km) in supercruise
  - 595 nmi (685 mi; 1,102 km) clean subsonic
  - 750 nmi (863 mi; 1,389 km) with 100 nmi in supercruise with 2× 600 U.S. gal tanks (Note: 860 nmi subsonic with 2× 600 U.S. gal tanks. All figures include −6% routing factor, combat and 2× GBU-32 + 2× AIM-9 + 2× AIM-120.)
- Ferry range: 1,740 nmi (2,000 mi, 3,220 km)
- Service ceiling: 65,000 ft (20,000 m)
- g limits: +9.0/−3.0
- Wing loading: 77.2 lb/sq ft (377 kg/m^{2})
- Thrust/weight: 1.08 (1.25 with loaded weight and 50% internal fuel)

Armament

- Guns: 1× 20 mm M61A2 Vulcan rotary cannon, 480 rounds
- Internal weapons bays:
  - 8× internal weapon stations for a combination of:
  - Air-to-air mission loadout:
    - 6× AIM-120C/D AMRAAM or
    - 4× AIM-120A/B
    - 2× AIM-9M/X Sidewinder
  - Air-to-ground mission loadout:
    - 2× 1,000 lb (450 kg) JDAM and 2× AIM-120 or
    - 8× 250 lb (110 kg) GBU-39 SDB and 2× AIM-120 or
    - 4× 250 lb GBU-39 and 4× AIM-120
    - 2× AIM-9
- Hardpoint (external):
  - 4× under-wing pylon stations can be fitted to carry weapons, each with a capacity of 5,000 lb (2,270 kg) or 600 U.S. gallon (2,270 L) drop tanks
  - 4x AIM-120 AMRAAM (external)

Avionics

- AN/APG-77 or AN/APG-77(V)1 AESA radar: 125–150 miles (201–241 km) against 1 m^{2} (11 sq ft) targets (estimated range), more than 250 miles (400 km) in narrow beams
- AN/AAR-56 Missile Launch Detector (MLD)
- AN/ALR-94 electronic warfare system: 250 nautical miles (460 km) or more detection range for radar warning receiver (RWR)
- AN/ASQ-220 Integrated CNI Avionics including:
  - Inter/Intra-Flight Datalink (IFDL)
  - MIDS-JTRS
  - Link 16/JTIDS
  - IFF (Mode 5)
  - Embedded GPS/INS (EGI)
  - TACAN
  - HAVE QUICK/SATURN
  - SINCGARS
- MJU-39/40 flares for protection against IR missiles

== See also ==
- Advanced Tactical Fighter – U.S. Air Force stealth air superiority fighter program
- Aircraft in fiction § F-22 Raptor

Related development

- Lockheed YF-22 – American aircraft prototype
- Lockheed Martin FB-22 – Proposed bomber aircraft for the U.S. Air Force derived from the F-22 Raptor
- Lockheed Martin X-44 MANTA – Conceptual aircraft design by Lockheed Martin

Aircraft of comparable role, configuration, and era

- Chengdu J-20 – Chinese stealth fighter aircraft
- Lockheed Martin F-35 Lightning II – American stealth multirole fighter aircraft
- Sukhoi Su-57 – Russian stealth multirole fighter aircraft
- TAI TF Kaan – Turkish fighter aircraft

Related lists

- List of active United States military aircraft
- List of fighter aircraft
- List of Lockheed aircraft
- List of megaprojects, Aerospace
- List of military electronics of the United States
