= Northrop YF-23 =

Prototype demonstrator aircraft for the US Air Force Advanced Tactical Fighter program

YF-23
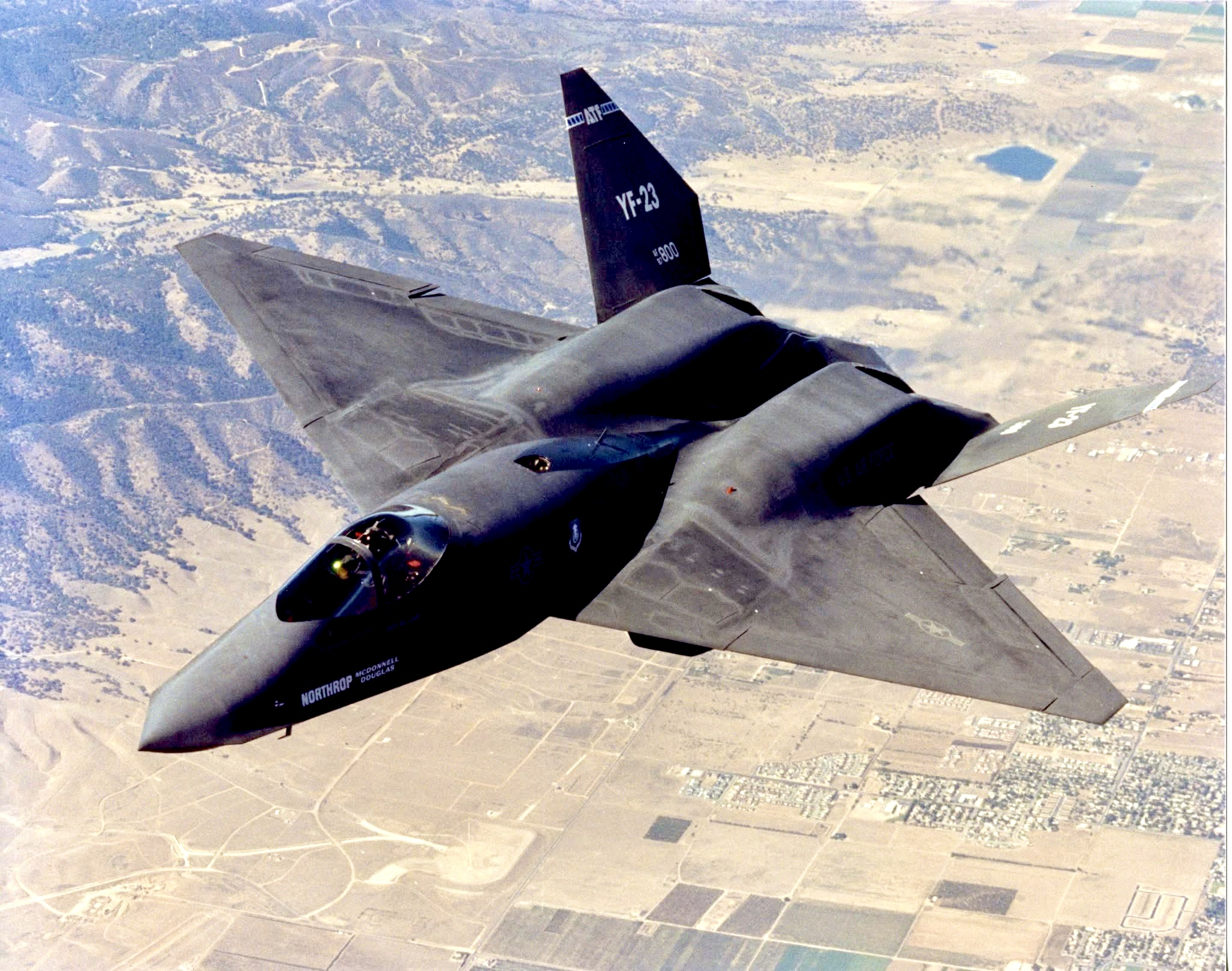
- YF-23 flying over Edwards Air Force Base

General information
- Type: Stealth fighter prototype Technology demonstrator
- National origin: United States
- Manufacturer: Northrop/McDonnell Douglas
- Status: Canceled
- Primary user: United States Air Force
- Number built: 2

History
- Manufactured: 1989–1990
- First flight: 27 August 1990

The Northrop–McDonnell Douglas YF-23 is an American single-seat, twin-engine, stealth fighter prototype technology demonstrator designed for the United States Air Force (USAF). The design team, with Northrop as the prime contractor, was a finalist in the USAF's Advanced Tactical Fighter (ATF) demonstration and validation competition, battling the Lockheed-led YF-22 team for full-scale development and production. Nicknamed "Black Widow II", two YF-23 prototypes were built.

In the 1980s, the USAF began looking for a replacement for its F-15 fighter aircraft to more effectively counter emerging threats such as the Soviet Union's advanced Su-27 and MiG-29 fighters. Several companies submitted design proposals; the USAF selected proposals from Northrop and Lockheed for demonstration and validation. Northrop teamed up with McDonnell Douglas to develop the YF-23, and Lockheed, Boeing, and General Dynamics developed the YF-22. The YF-23 was considered stealthier and faster, but less agile than its competitor. After a four-year development and evaluation process, the YF-22 team was announced as the winner in 1991 and developed the F-22 Raptor, which first flew in 1997 and entered service in 2005. The US Navy considered using a naval version of the ATF as an F-14 replacement, but these plans were later canceled due to costs.

After flight testing, both YF-23s were placed in storage while various agencies considered plans to use them for further research, but none proceeded. In 2004, Northrop Grumman (Note: Northrop acquired Grumman in 1994 to become Northrop Grumman.) used the second YF-23 as a display model for its proposed regional bomber aircraft, but this project was dropped because longer range bombers were required. The two YF-23 prototypes are currently displayed at the National Museum of the United States Air Force and the Western Museum of Flight.

== Development ==
=== Concept definition ===
American reconnaissance satellites first spotted the advanced Soviet Su-27 and MiG-29 fighter prototypes between 1977 and 1979, which caused concern in the US. Both Soviet models were expected to reduce the combat and maneuverability advantages of contemporary US fighter aircraft, including the newly introduced F-15 Eagle and F-16 Fighting Falcon. US tactical airpower was further threatened by new Soviet systems such as the A-50 airborne warning and control system (AWACS) revealed in 1978 and more advanced surface-to-air missile systems. In light of these late-Cold War threats, the USAF in 1981 began developing requirements and discussing with the aerospace industry on concepts for an Advanced Tactical Fighter (ATF) with both air-to-air and air-to-ground missions in consideration. The ATF was to take advantage of emerging technologies, including composite materials, lightweight alloys, advanced flight-control systems, more powerful engines, and stealth technology.

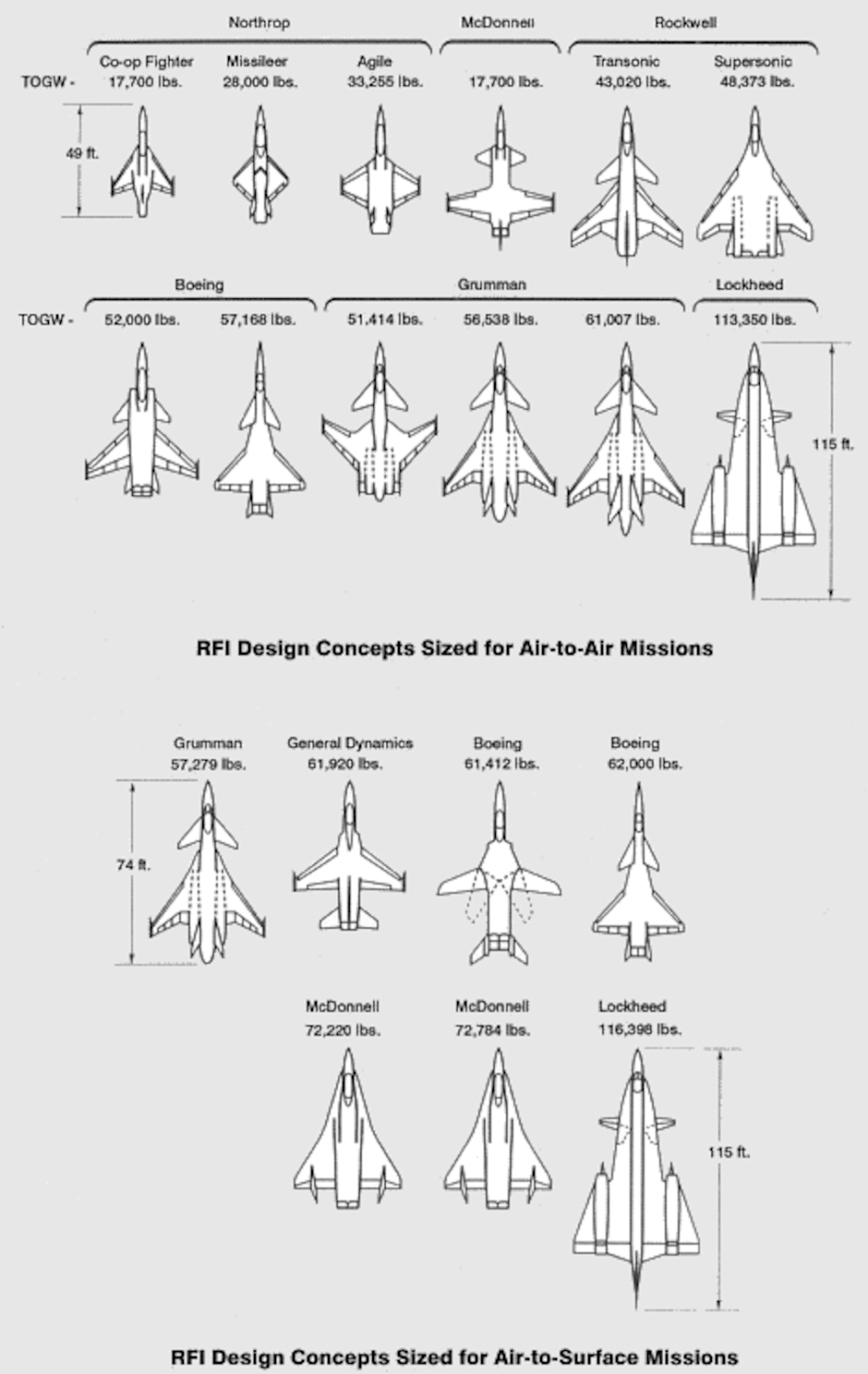
Diagram of several designs submitted for ATF RFI, showing the comparatively small sizes of Northrop's initial designs

The USAF released the ATF request for information (RFI) in May 1981 to the aerospace defense industry on possible features for the new fighter. Later code-named "Senior Sky", the ATF at this time was still in the midst of requirements definition, which meant that there was considerable variety in the responses from the aerospace companies. Northrop submitted three designs for the RFI, ranging from ultra low-cost, to highly agile, to low-observable missileer; all were on the smaller and lighter end of the response spectrum. In 1983, the ATF System Program Office (SPO) was formed at Wright-Patterson Air Force Base from the initial Concept Development Team (CDT). After discussions with aerospace companies and Tactical Air Command (TAC), the CDT/SPO made air-to-air combat the primary role for the ATF, which would replace the F-15 and emphasize outstanding kinematic performance with supersonic cruise and maneuver. Northrop's response was a larger Mach 2+ design designated N-360 with delta wings, a single vertical tail, and twin engines with thrust vectoring nozzles and thrust reversers. Around this time, the SPO also became aware of the very low radar cross section (RCS) results from the Air Force's "black world" innovations such as the Have Blue/F-117 ("Senior Trend"), Tacit Blue, and the Advanced Technology Bomber (ATB) program (which resulted in the B-2, or "Senior Ice"); consequently, the SPO increasingly emphasized stealth for survivability and combat effectiveness while still requiring fighter-like speed and maneuverability.

Northrop was able to quickly adapt to the ATF's increasing emphasis on stealth. Since October 1981, a small team of engineers under Robert Sandusky within its ATB/B-2 division had been working on stealth fighter designs. Sandusky later became the Northrop ATF's Chief Engineer, and fellow B-2 stealth engineer Yu Ping Liu was recruited in 1985 as the chief scientist. (Note: Additional individuals with key roles include Walter Fellers for configurations, and Merle Jager and William Moore for aerodynamics.) Three design concepts were studied: the Agile Maneuverable Fighter (AMF) similar to N-360 with two canted vertical tails and the best aerodynamic performance of the three but with minimal stealth, the Ultra Stealth Fighter (USF) that emphasized maximum stealth through edge alignment with only four RCS lobes and nicknamed "Christmas Tree" for its planform shape, and the High Stealth Fighter (HSF) that balanced stealth and maneuverability with diamond wings, all-moving V-tail "ruddervators" (or butterfly tails), engine exhaust troughs, and aligned edges for eight RCS lobes. (Note: Northrop ATF configurator Darold Cummings stated that despite its excellent stealth potential, USF (DP21/DP22) was unsuitable due to aerodynamic qualities that made it uncontrollable beyond roughly 10° angle-of-attack.) First emerging in 1983, HSF took many design cues from the B-2 to reduce its susceptibility to radar and infrared detection, and Liu's understanding of both radar signatures and aerodynamics lent itself to key design features, such as the shaping of the nose (nicknamed the "platypus" for the initial shape and pronounced chine edges) and canopy with their continuously curved, Gaussian surfaces. By 1985, HSF had evolved to be recognizably similar to the eventual YF-23 and emerged as the optimal balance of stealth and aerodynamic performance.

=== Demonstration and validation ===
From left to right, flat-plate models of Northrop's AMF, USF ("Christmas Tree"), and HSF design concepts. HSF was the preferred concept by 1985.

By November 1984, concept exploration had allowed the SPO to narrow its requirements and release the Statement of Operational Need, which called for a 50,000 lb (22,700 kg) takeoff weight fighter with stealth and excellent kinematics, including prolonged supersonic flight without the use of afterburners, or supercruise; mission radius was expected to be 500 nautical miles (580 mi; 930 km) mixed subsonic/supersonic or 700–800 nautical miles (806–921 mi; 1,300–1,480 km) subsonic. In September 1985, the USAF issued the request for proposal (RFP) for demonstration and validation (Dem/Val) to several aircraft manufacturers with the top four proposals, later cut down to two to reduce program costs, proceeding to the next phase; as well as the ATF's demanding technical requirements, the RFP also emphasized systems engineering, technology development plans, and risk mitigation. The RFP saw some changes after initial release; following the SPO's discussions with Lockheed and Northrop regarding their experiences with the F-117 and B-2, all-aspect stealth requirements were drastically increased in late 1985. Although there was initially no requirement for the evaluation of prototype air vehicles, this was added in May 1986 due to recommendations from the Packard Commission, a federal commission by President Ronald Reagan to study Department of Defense procurement practices. At this time, the USAF envisioned procuring 750 ATFs at a unit flyaway cost of $35 million in fiscal year (FY) 1985 dollars ($86.4 million in 2024). The US Navy under the Navy Advanced Tactical Fighter (NATF) program announced in 1988 that it would use a derivative of the ATF winner to replace its F-14 Tomcat and called for the procurement of 546 aircraft.

Northrop's DP110 submission for Dem/Val RFP, which was similar to the eventual YF-23

Northrop's early work on the HSF paid off for the Dem/Val RFP. By January 1986, the HSF evolved into Design Proposal 86E (DP86E) as a refined and well-understood concept through extensive computational fluid dynamics simulations, wind tunnel testing, and RCS pole testing and became Northrop's preference for its ATF submission. Northrop's ability to design and analyze stealthy curved surfaces, stemming back to its work on Tacit Blue and the ATB/B-2, gave their designers an early advantage in combining stealth with aerodynamics, especially since Lockheed, the only other company with extensive stealth experience, had previously relied on faceting as on the F-117 and lost the ATB to Northrop as a result. That loss, along with the poor aerodynamic performance of their early faceted ATF concept, forced Lockheed to also develop designs and analysis methods with curved stealthy surfaces. Northrop's HSF design was refined into DP110, which was its submission for the Dem/Val RFP.

In July 1986, proposals for Dem/Val were submitted by Lockheed, Boeing, General Dynamics, McDonnell Douglas, Northrop, Grumman and North American Rockwell; the latter two dropped out of the competition shortly thereafter. As contractors were expected to make significant investments for technology development, companies forming teams was encouraged by the SPO. Following proposal submissions, Northrop and McDonnell Douglas formed a team to develop whichever of their proposed designs was selected, if any. Lockheed, Boeing, and General Dynamics formed a team with a similar agreement.

Lockheed and Northrop, the two industry leaders in stealth aircraft, were selected as the two finalists on 31 October 1986 for Dem/Val at first and second place, although the approaches to their proposals were markedly different. Northrop's refined and well-understood design proposal was a significant advantage, especially in contrast to Lockheed's immature design, but the Lockheed proposal's focus on systems engineering rather than a point aircraft design actually pulled it ahead. Both teams were awarded $691 million in FY 1985 dollars (~$1.71 billion in 2024) and given 50 months for demonstration and validation, culminating in the flight-test of their prototypes. The SPO designated YF-22 for Lockheed's aircraft and YF-23 for Northrop's. Pratt & Whitney and General Electric had also been contracted to develop the engines, designated YF119 and YF120 respectively, for the ATF engine competition. Because of the late addition of the prototyping requirement due to political pressure, the prototype air vehicles were to be "best-effort" machines not meant to perform a competitive flyoff or represent a production aircraft that meets every requirement, but to demonstrate the viability of its concept and mitigate risk. (Note: The contractor teams were to give the SPO "sealed envelope" flight performance predictions against which their prototypes would be evaluated, rather than against each other.)

=== Design refinement ===
Artwork of Northrop partner McDonnell Douglas' submission for Dem/Val RFP; this design had little influence on the YF-23.

As one of the winning companies for the Dem/Val proposals, Northrop was the program lead of the YF-23 team with McDonnell Douglas; the two had previously collaborated on the F/A-18 Hornet. As well as the government contract awards, the team also invested $650 million (~$1.48 billion in 2024) combined into their ATF effort; General Electric and Pratt & Whitney, the two engine companies, also invested $100 million (~$228 million in 2024) each. Airframe fabrication was divided roughly evenly, with Northrop building the aft fuselage and empennage in Hawthorne, California and performing final assembly at Edwards Air Force Base and McDonnell Douglas built the wings and forward fuselage in St. Louis, Missouri. Manufacturing was greatly assisted by the use of computer-aided design software. The YF-23 design was largely a continual refinement from Northrop's DP110 HSF with little influence from McDonnell Douglas's design, which had swept trapezoidal wings, four empennage surfaces, and chin-mounted split wedge inlets and did not perform well for stealth. The YF-23's design evolved into DP117K when it was frozen as the prototype configuration in January 1988, with changes including a sharper and more voluminous nose from the earlier "platypus" shape for better radar performance and a strengthened aft deck with lower drag shaping. Due to the complex surface curvature, the aircraft was built outside-in, with the large composite skin structures fabricated first before the internal members. To ensure precise and responsive handling characteristics, Northrop developed and tested the flight control laws using both a large-scale simulator as well as a modified C-131 Samaritan named the Total In Flight Simulator (TIFS).

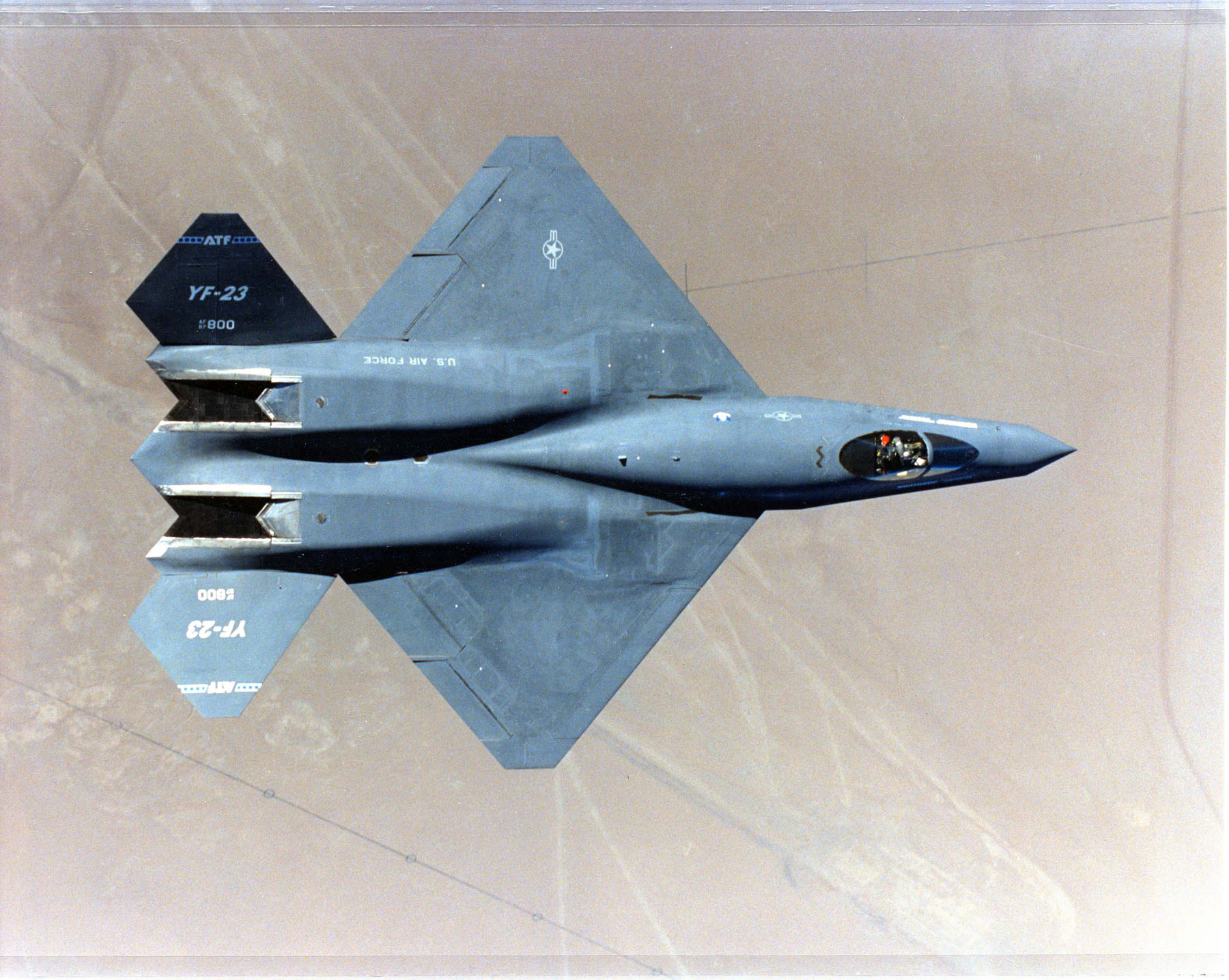
Top view of the YF-23 (DP117K), showing the diamond wings and separation between the forward fuselage and engine nacelles

Throughout Dem/Val, the SPO conducted System Requirements Reviews (SRR) where it reviewed results of performance and cost trade studies with both the Lockheed and Northrop teams to develop the ATF system specifications and, if necessary, adjusted requirements and deleted ones that added substantial weight or cost with marginal value. The ATF was initially required to land and stop within 2,000 feet (610 m), which meant the use of thrust reversers on their engines. In 1987, the USAF changed the runway length requirement to 3,000 feet (910 m) and by 1988 the requirement for thrust reversers was no longer needed. This allowed Northrop to have smaller engine nacelle housings with the space between them filled in to preserve area ruling in subsequent design refinements for the F-23 full system design, or Preferred System Concept (PSC). As the YF-23 design (DP117K) had been frozen by then, the nacelles—nicknamed "bread loafs" for their flat upper surface—were not downsized on the prototypes. The number of internal missiles (with the AIM-120A AMRAAM as the reference baseline) was reduced from eight to six. Despite these adjustments, both teams struggled to achieve the 50,000-lb takeoff gross weight goal, and this was subsequently increased to 60,000 lb (27,200 kg) while engine thrust increased from 30,000 lbf (133 kN) class to 35,000 lbf (156 kN) class.

Aside from advances in air vehicle and engine design, the ATF also required innovations in avionics and sensor systems with the goal of achieving sensor fusion to enhance situational awareness and reduce pilot workload. The YF-23 was meant as a demonstrator for the airframe and propulsion system design and thus did not mount any mission systems avionics of the PSC F-23. Instead, Northrop and McDonnell Douglas tested these systems on ground and airborne laboratories with Northrop using a modified BAC One-Eleven as a flying avionics laboratory and McDonnell Douglas building the Avionics Ground Prototype (AGP) to evaluate software and hardware performance and reliability; sensors evaluated include a Westinghouse/Texas Instruments phased-array radar and a Martin Marietta infrared search and track (IRST). (Note: The F-22 team and F-23 team both chose the same Westinghouse/Texas Instruments radar, which eventually became the AN/APG-77.) Avionics requirements were also the subject of SPO SRRs with contractors and adjusted during Dem/Val. For example, the IRST sensor was dropped from a baseline requirement to provision for future addition in 1989.

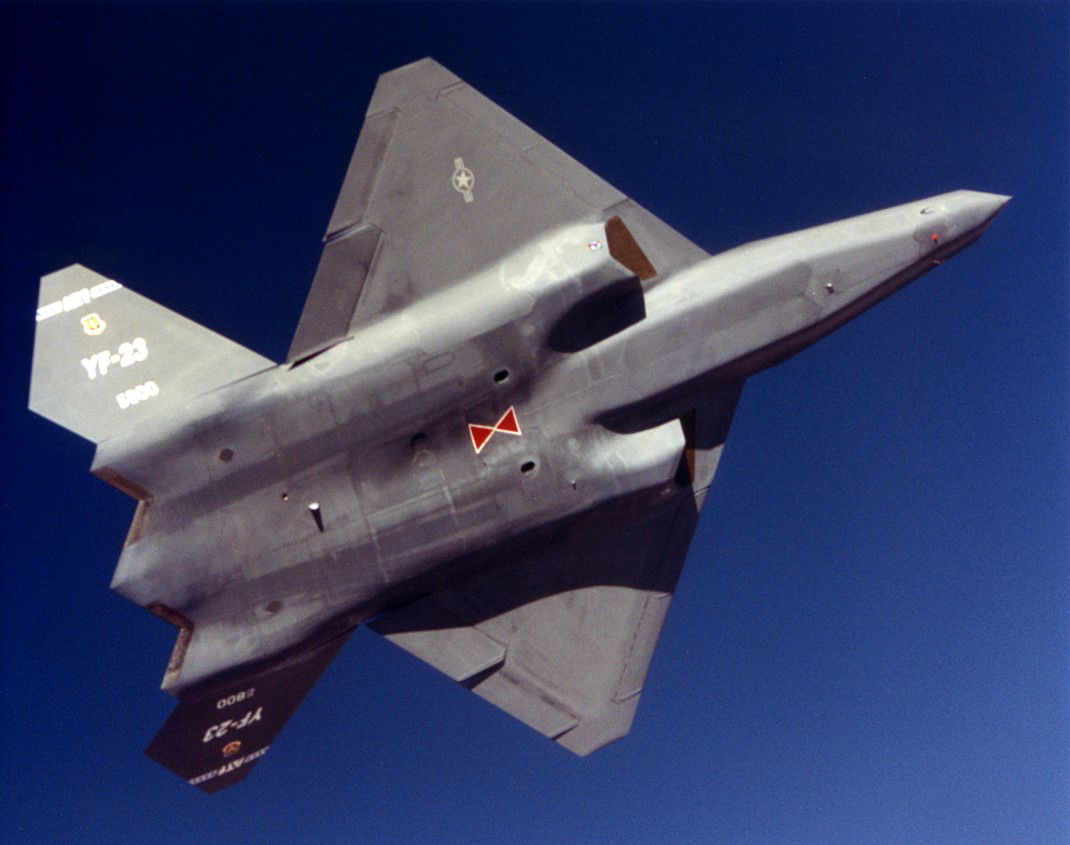
The red hourglass painted on the YF-23 PAV-1 for its maiden flight

Formally designated as the YF-23A, the first aircraft (serial number 87-0800), Prototype Air Vehicle 1 (PAV-1), was rolled out on 22 June 1990. The first YF-23 was painted charcoal gray and was nicknamed "Gray Ghost". The second prototype (serial number 87-0801, PAV-2) was painted in two shades of gray and nicknamed "Spider". PAV-1 briefly had a red hourglass painted on its ram air scoop to prevent injury to ground crew. The red hourglass resembled the marking on the underside of the black widow spider, further reinforcing the unofficial nickname "Black Widow II" given to the YF-23 because of its 8-lobe radar cross section plot shape that resembled a spider and as homage to the Northrop P-61 Black Widow of World War II. When Northrop management found out about the marking, they had it removed.

=== Naval variant ===
A proposed naval variant of the F-23, sometimes known unofficially as the NATF-23 (the proposed naval variants were never formally designated), was considered as an F-14 Tomcat replacement for the U.S. Navy. The original HSF configuration of the F-23 was first considered with the initial DP500 design but would have had issues with flight deck space (it was to be no longer than the F-14), handling, storage, landing, and catapult launching, thus necessitating a different design. By 1989, the design was narrowed down to two possible configurations: DP533 with four tails and DP527 with two V-tails and canards. DP527 was determined to be the better solution. The NATF-23 design was submitted along with the F-23 proposal for full-scale development, or engineering and manufacturing development (EMD), in December 1990. However, by late 1990 the Navy was already beginning to back out of the NATF program and fully abandoned it by FY 1992 due to escalating costs. A wind tunnel test model of DP527, tested for 14,000 hours, was donated (with canards removed) by Boeing St. Louis (formerly McDonnell Douglas) (Note: Boeing merged with McDonnell Douglas in 1997 under the former's name.) in 2001 to the Bellefontaine Neighbors Klein Park Veterans Memorial in St. Louis, Missouri.

== Design ==
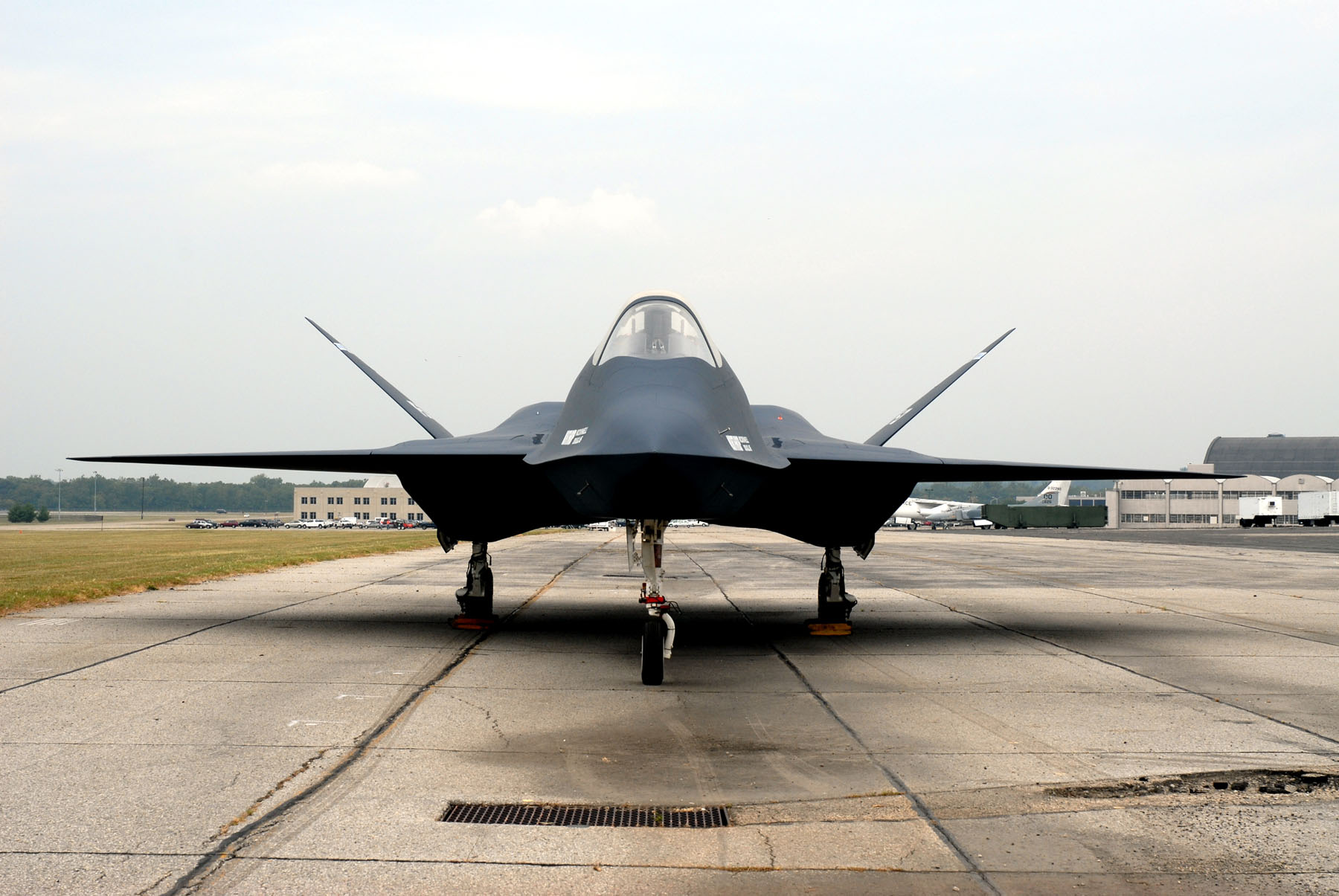
A front view of PAV-1 87–0800 showing the curving exterior of the design

The YF-23A was a prototype intended to demonstrate the viability of Northrop's ATF proposal, which was designed to meet USAF requirements for survivability, supercruise, stealth, and ease of maintenance. Owing to its continual maturation from the initial High Stealth Fighter (HSF) concept which it still greatly resembled, the YF-23's shaping was highly refined. It was an unconventional-looking aircraft, with diamond-shaped wings tapered symmetrically (edges swept 40° front and back), a profile with substantial area-ruling to reduce wave drag, and all-moving V-tails, or "ruddervators". The cockpit was placed high, near the nose of the aircraft, for good visibility for the pilot. The chiseled shape of the nose, with its sharp chine edges, generated vortices to improve high angle of attack (AoA) characteristics. The aircraft featured a tricycle landing gear configuration with a nose landing gear leg and two main landing gear legs. The aerial refueling receptacle was centered on the spine of the forward fuselage. A single large weapons bay was placed on the underside of the fuselage between the nose and main landing gear. The cockpit had a center stick and side throttles.

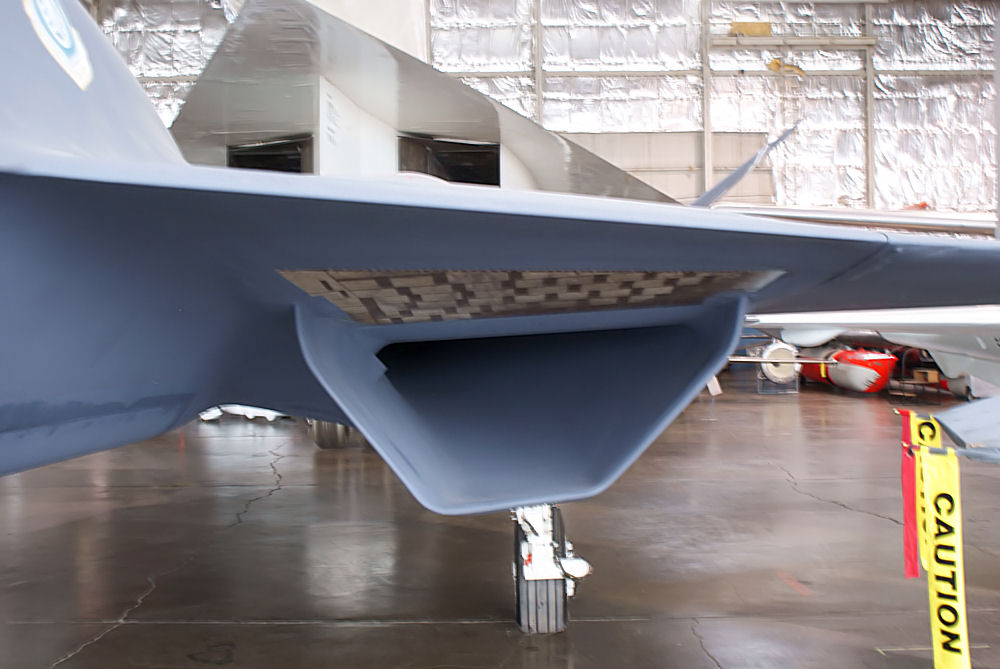
YF-23 S-duct engine air intake with the porous suction panel in front

It was powered by two turbofan engines, with each in a separate engine nacelle with S-ducts to shield engine axial compressors from radar waves, on either side of the aircraft's spine. The fixed-geometry inlets were widely spaced and trapezoidal in frontal profile, with a bleed system to absorb the turbulent boundary layer by using porous suction panels in front of the inlet. The boundary layer air was then ducted to vents and doors over the fuselage and wings.

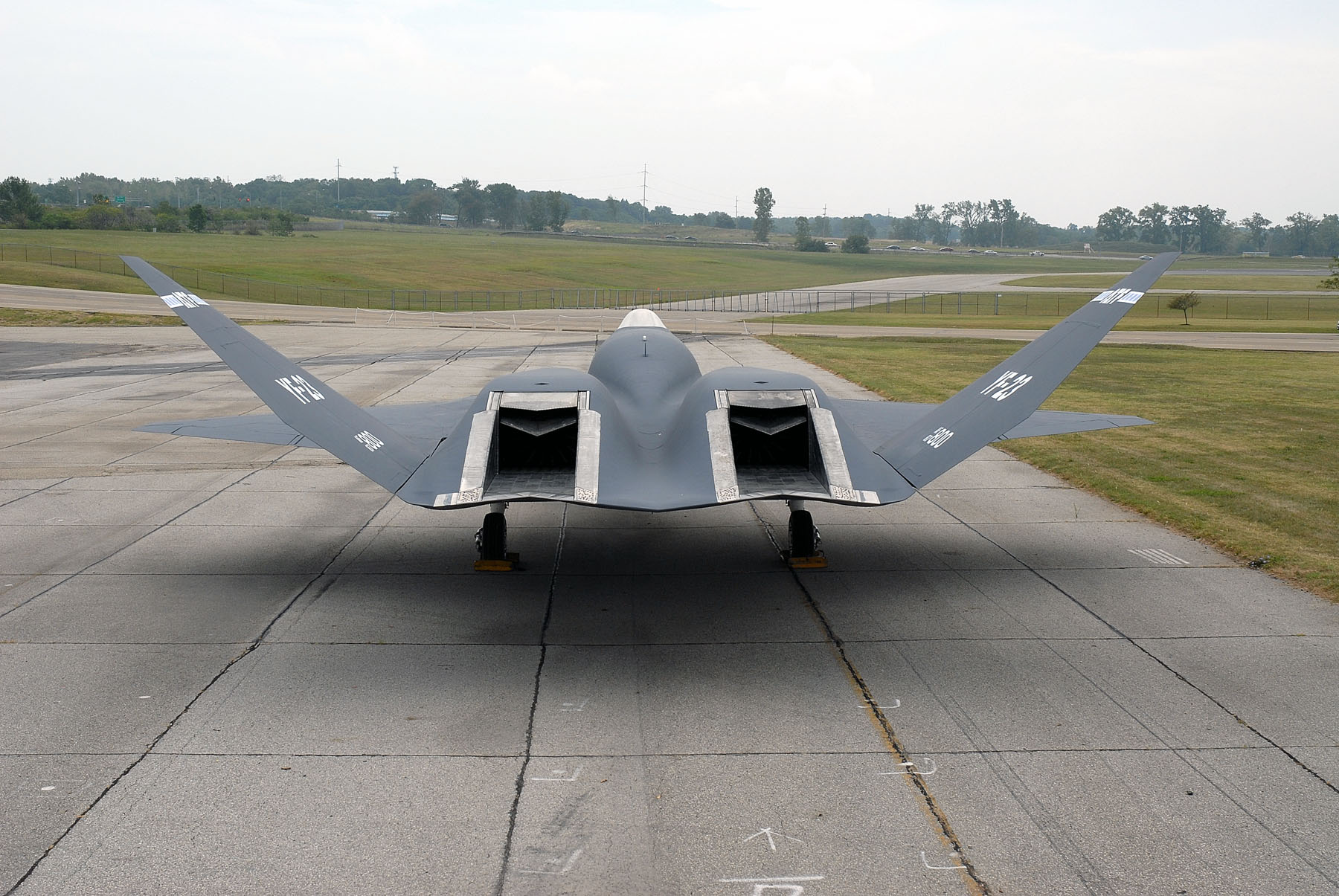
A rear view of a YF-23, showing its tile-lined exhaust channels

Of the two aircraft built, the first YF-23 (PAV-1) had Pratt & Whitney YF119 engines, and the second (PAV-2) was powered by General Electric YF120 engines. The aircraft had single-expansion ramp nozzles (SERN) where, as on the B-2, the exhaust from the engines flowed through troughs in the aft deck lined with heat-abating tiles to shield the exhaust from infrared homing (IR) missile detection from below. The tiles, made by Detroit Diesel Allison, were built from a porous material called "Lamilloy" and "transpiration cooled" from engine bleed air to dissipate heat. (Note: One particular risk area for the YF-23 and F-23 design was the aft deck heating from the engine exhaust, and the performance and cost of the "Lamilloy" exhaust liners for the troughs became the subject of lawsuits between Northrop and the material developer Allison.) Unlike the YF-22, the YF-23 did not use thrust vectoring. The YF-23's propulsion and aerodynamics, designed to minimize drag at transonic and supersonic speeds, enabled it to cruise efficiently at over Mach 1.5 without afterburners.

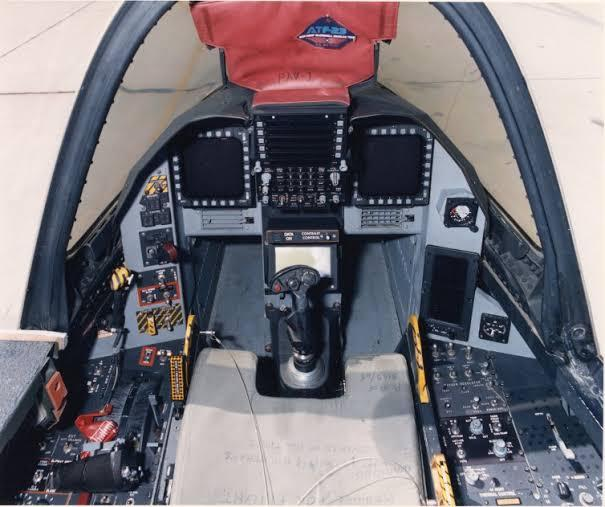
The YF-23 cockpit, based around the F-15E's

The YF-23 was statically unstable—having relaxed stability—and flown through fly-by-wire which provided artificial stability with the flight control surfaces controlled by a central management computer system. Raising the wing flaps and ailerons on one side and lowering them on the other provided roll. The V-tail fins were angled 50 degrees from the vertical. Pitch was mainly provided by rotating these V-tail fins in opposite directions so their front edges moved together or apart. Yaw was primarily obtained by rotating the tail fins in the same direction. Chief test pilot Alfred "Paul" Metz stated that the YF-23 had superior high AoA performance to legacy aircraft, with trimmed AoA of up to 60°. Deflecting the wing flaps down and ailerons up on both sides simultaneously provided for aerodynamic braking. To keep prototyping costs low despite the novel design, some commercial off-the-shelf components were used, including an F-15 nose wheel, F/A-18 main landing gear parts, and the forward cockpit components of the F-15E Strike Eagle.

=== Production F-23 ===
Cutaway drawing of the EMD F-23 design (DP231)

The proposed production F-23 configuration (DP231 for the F119 engine and DP232 for the F120 engine) for full-scale development, or Engineering & Manufacturing Development (EMD), represented the final refinement of the HSF concept and would have differed from the YF-23 prototypes in several ways. Rather than a single weapons bay, the EMD design would have had two tandem bays in the lengthened forward fuselage, with the forward bay designed for short range AIM-9 Sidewinder missiles and the aft bay for AIM-120 missiles and bombs. An M61 rotary cannon would be installed on the left side of the forward fuselage. The F-23's overall length and height were slightly increased to 70 ft 5 in (21.46 m) and 14 ft 8 in (4.47 m) respectively; wingspan remained about the same at 43 ft 7 in (13.28 m) with the same wing area of 950 sq ft (88.26 m^{2}). (Note: 70 ft 5 in was the length of DP231, while DP232 was 5 in (12.7 cm) longer at 70 ft 10 in (21.59 m) due to the slightly larger F120 engines, with a small additional notch (less ideal) in the fuselage and empennage trailing edge pattern; wingspan and height remained the same as DP231.) Fuselage volume was expanded for avionics and more fuel, with the nose and radome enlarged to accept sensors and mission systems, including the active electronically scanned array (AESA) radar. The forward fuselage cross section was more squared off with the forebody chines less pronounced and raised to the same waterline height as the wing's leading edge. The deletion of thrust reversers enabled the engine nacelles to have a smaller, more rounded cross-section, and the trough between them was filled in to preserve area-ruling. The edges of the exhaust trough's heat-abating lining in the aft deck were aligned with the planform sweep angles for stealth. The inlet design changed from the trapezoidal profile with suction panels to a serrated semicircular cowl with a conical compression bump acting as a fixed shock cone and the boundary layer control vents were simplified. The fuselage and empennage trailing edge pattern would also have fewer serrations and the engine thrust lines were toed in at 1.5° off center. The EMD proposal had both single-seat F-23A and two-seat F-23B variants.

=== NATF-23 ===
Perspective CAD drawing of NATF-23 DP527, showing the drastic departure from the YF-23's HSF configuration

The naval NATF-23 variant (internally designated DP527), the schematics of which surfaced in the 2010s, differed significantly from the YF-23 due to the requirements of aircraft carrier operations as well as the Navy's greater emphasis on long range sensors, weapons, and loiter time for fleet air defense. (Note: The DP527 drawings show the same F119 engines as the Air Force version, but the final powerplant may have been a modified variant with greater bypass ratio for improved fuel efficiency at the expense of supercruise performance.) The diamond wings were placed as far back as possible, and the aircraft had ruddervators with a more vertical cant and serrations to reduce overall length, folding wing capability for flight deck storage, reinforced landing gear, tailhook and dihedral canted canards for increased maneuverability at low speeds to land on aircraft carriers, and two-dimensional thrust vectoring nozzles instead of SERNs. The inlet design was also different, being a quarter circle serrated cowl and a conical compression surface, and closer to the centerline adjacent to the forward fuselage; the inlet was offset from the fuselage by a gap to bypass the boundary layer. The internal weapons bay was split into two compartments by a bulkhead along the centerline in the forward fuselage to strengthen the aircraft's keel and would have accommodated the Navy's planned AIM-152 advanced air-to-air missiles (AAAM) as well as potentially the AGM-88 HARM and AGM-84 Harpoon. The bay doors would carry AIM-9 missiles and an M61 rotary cannon would be installed in a fairing in the right wing. The NATF-23 had an increased 48 ft (14.63 m) wingspan and 17 ft 5 in (5.31 m) height, and a larger wing area of 1,050 sq ft (97.55 m^{2}); overall length was reduced to 62 ft 8.5 in (19.11 m), the same as the F-14. Folded wingspan would be 23 ft 4 in (7.11 m). Like the Air Force version, the NATF-23 had both single-seat and two-seat variants.

=== Proposed revival ===
Northrop Grumman concept art of the FB-23 "Rapid Theater Attack" regional bomber

In 2004, Northrop Grumman proposed an F-23-based bomber called the FB-23 (Note: The "F/B-23" designation was also used.) "Rapid Theater Attack" (RTA) to meet a USAF solicitation for an interim regional bomber, for which the Lockheed Martin FB-22 and Boeing B-1R were also competing. The FB-23 would have a two-seat cockpit and a similar planform shape to the F-23, but considerably larger in all dimensions, about 100 ft (30 m) in overall length, to fulfill the bomber role with a combat radius of over 1,600 nautical miles (1,840 mi; 2,960 km) and internal payload of 10,000 lb (4,540 kg). The engines would also have round axisymmetric nozzles above the aft deck rather than each having a single wedge-shaped flap. The EMD F-23's semicircular inlet design with the conical compression bump was retained. Northrop Grumman modified the YF-23 PAV-2 to serve as a display model for its proposed interim bomber. The possibility of an FB-23 interim bomber ended with the 2006 Quadrennial Defense Review, which favored a long-range strategic bomber with much greater range. The USAF has since moved on to the Next-Generation Bomber and Long Range Strike Bomber program.

In 2018, Northrop Grumman responded to a Japan Air Self-Defense Force (JASDF) solicitation for industry partners to assist with the development of its fifth/sixth generation (F-X) fighter. There was speculation that the company could offer a modernized version of the F-23 to the JASDF. Meanwhile, Lockheed Martin offered an airframe derived from the F-22. Ultimately, Japan did not move forward with these proposals due to cost and industrial work-share concerns.

== Operational history ==
=== Evaluation ===
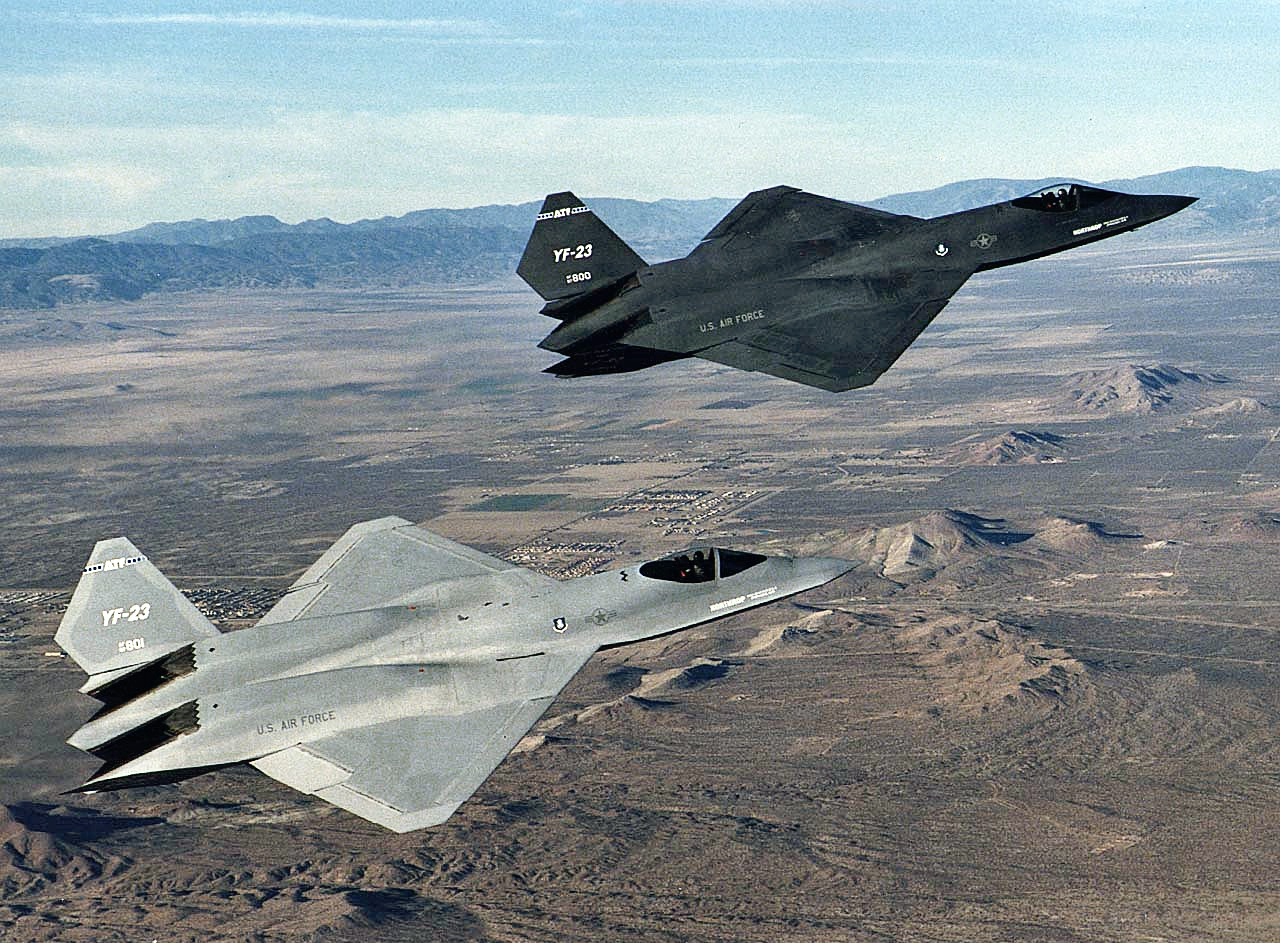
The two YF-23s flying over the Mojave Desert. They were nicknamed "Gray Ghost" (background), and "Spider" (foreground).

The first YF-23, PAV-1 with Pratt & Whitney engines, took its 50-minute maiden flight on 27 August 1990 with Paul Metz at the controls. (Note: Metz later became the chief test pilot for the EMD/production F-22.) The second YF-23, PAV-2 with General Electric engines, made its first flight on 26 October, piloted by Jim Sandberg. PAV-1 supercruised at Mach 1.43 on 18 September 1990, while PAV-2 reached over Mach 1.6 on 29 November, topping out at Mach 1.72. (Note: The YF-23 with the General Electric engines was officially stated to have been able to supercruise at over Mach 1.6, and estimates from General Electric engineers suggest that the top supercruise speed was as high as Mach 1.8.) By comparison, the YF-22 achieved Mach 1.58 in supercruise. The YF-23 was tested to a top speed of Mach 1.8 with afterburners and achieved a maximum angle-of-attack of 25°. The maximum speed is classified, though sources state a speed greater than Mach 2 at altitude in full afterburner. The aircraft's weapons bay was configured for weapons launch, and used for testing bay acoustics, but no missiles were fired; Lockheed fired AIM-9 and AIM-120 missiles successfully from the YF-22. PAV-1 performed a fast-paced combat demonstration with six flights over a 10-hour period on 30 November 1990. Flight testing continued into December. The two YF-23s flew 50 times for a total of 65.2 hours. The tests demonstrated Northrop's predicted performance values for the YF-23. Both designs met or exceeded all performance requirements; the YF-23 was considered stealthier and faster, but the YF-22 was more agile.

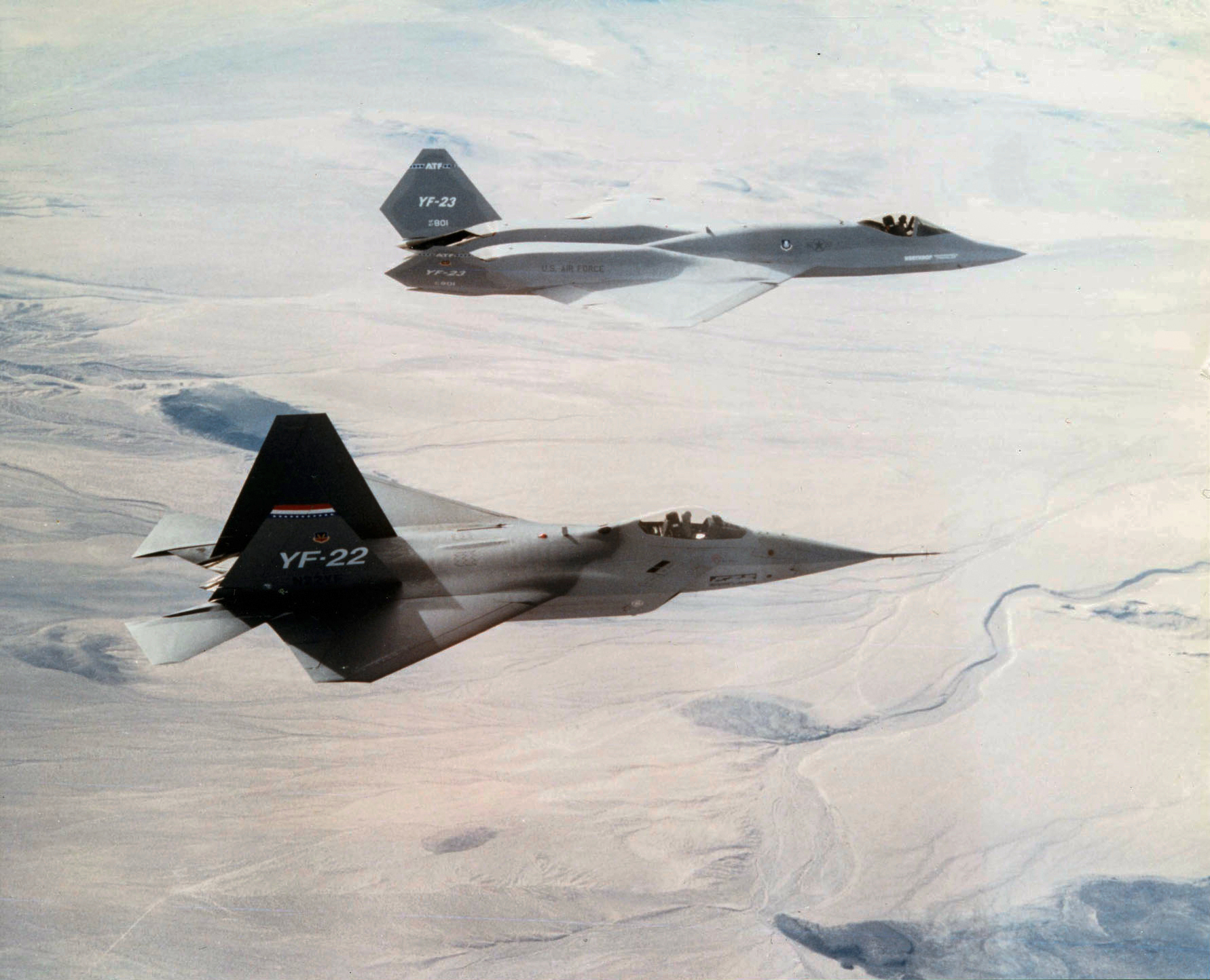
A YF-22 in the foreground with a YF-23 in the background

The two contractor teams submitted evaluation results and their PSC proposals for full-scale development, or EMD, in December 1990, and on 23 April 1991, Donald Rice, the Secretary of the Air Force announced that the YF-22 team was the winner. The Air Force also selected the Pratt & Whitney F119 engine to power the F-22 production version. The Lockheed and Pratt & Whitney designs were rated higher on technical aspects, considered lower risk (the YF-23 flew considerably fewer sorties and hours than its counterpart), and were considered to have more effective program management. Aviation observers have speculated that Northrop's poor performance on the B-2 and AGM-137 TSSAM programs with cost overruns and delays contributed to the loss. Furthermore, it has been speculated in the aviation press that the Lockheed design was also seen as more adaptable as the basis for the Navy's NATF, but by FY 1992 the US Navy had abandoned NATF.

Following the competition, both YF-23s were transferred to NASA's Dryden Flight Research Center at Edwards AFB, California, without their engines. NASA planned to use one of the aircraft to study techniques for the calibration of predicted loads to measured flight results, but this did not happen. Both YF-23 airframes remained in storage until mid-1996 when they were transferred to museums, with PAV-2 briefly serving as a display model for the proposed FB-23 regional bomber in 2004.

== Aircraft on display ==
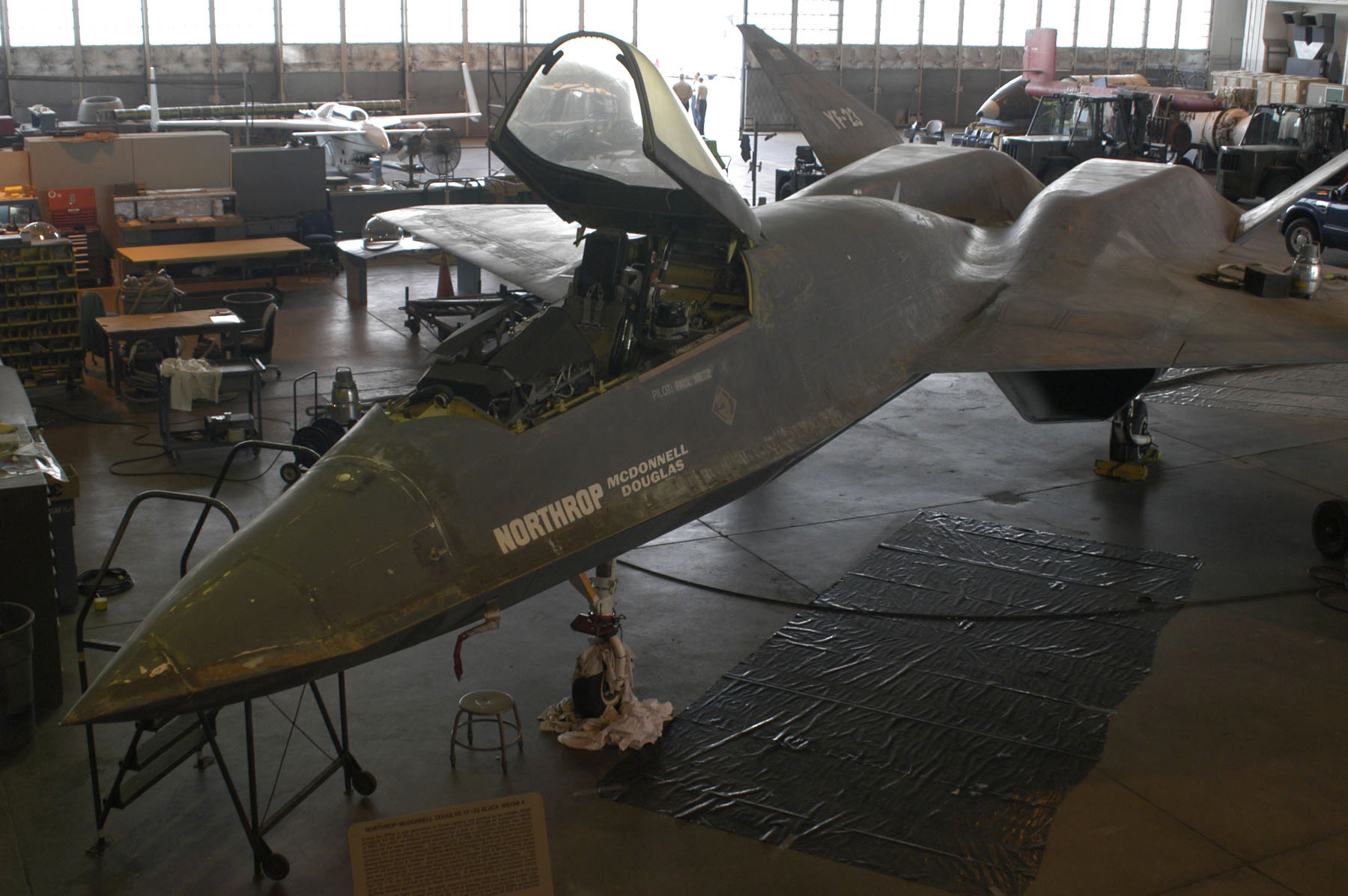
PAV-1 restoration work at the USAF Museum

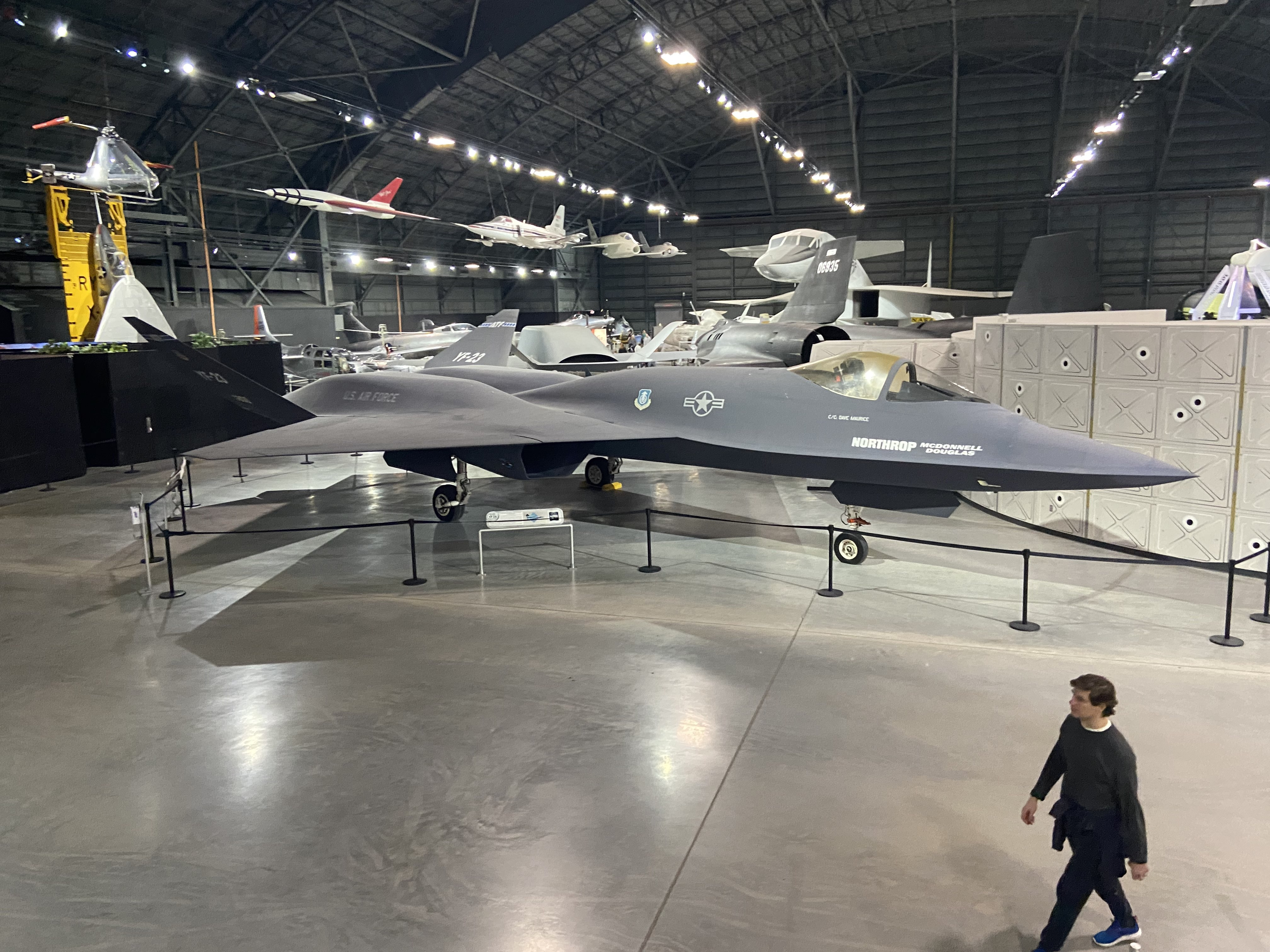
YF-23 "Gray Ghost" on display at the USAF Museum, 2023

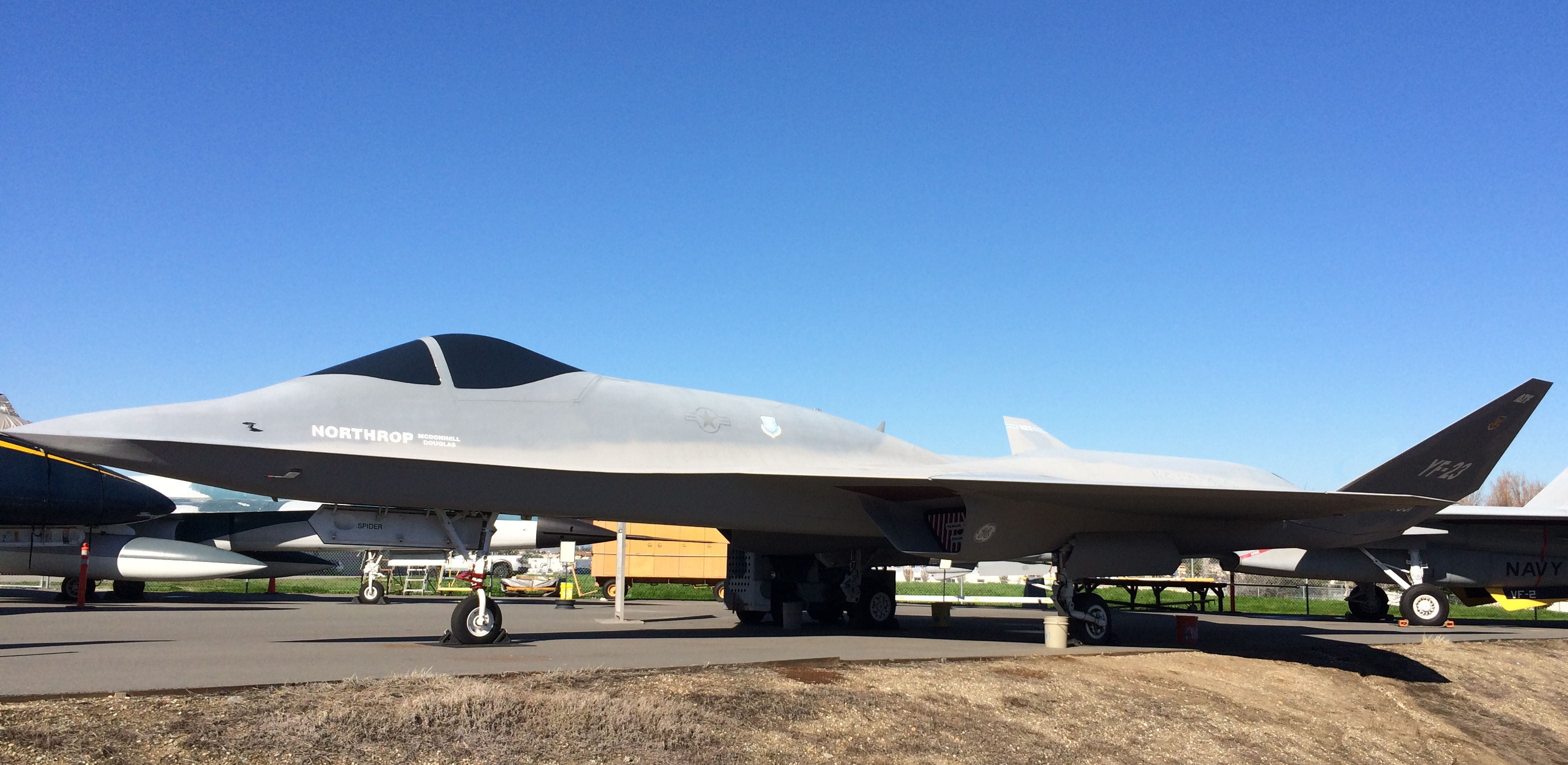
YF-23 "Spider" on display at the Western Museum of Flight, 2017

- YF-23A PAV-1, Air Force serial number 87-0800, "Gray Ghost", registration number N231YF, is on display in the Research and Development hangar of the National Museum of the United States Air Force near Dayton, Ohio.
- YF-23A PAV-2, AF ser. no. 87-0801, "Spider", registration number N232YF, was on exhibit at the Western Museum of Flight until 2004, when it was reclaimed by Northrop Grumman and used as a display model for an F-23-based regional bomber. PAV-2 was returned to the Western Museum of Flight in 2010 and is on display after the museum's relocation at Zamperini Field in Torrance, California.

== Specifications (YF-23A) ==
YF-23 3-view drawing from Northrop/McDonnell Douglas

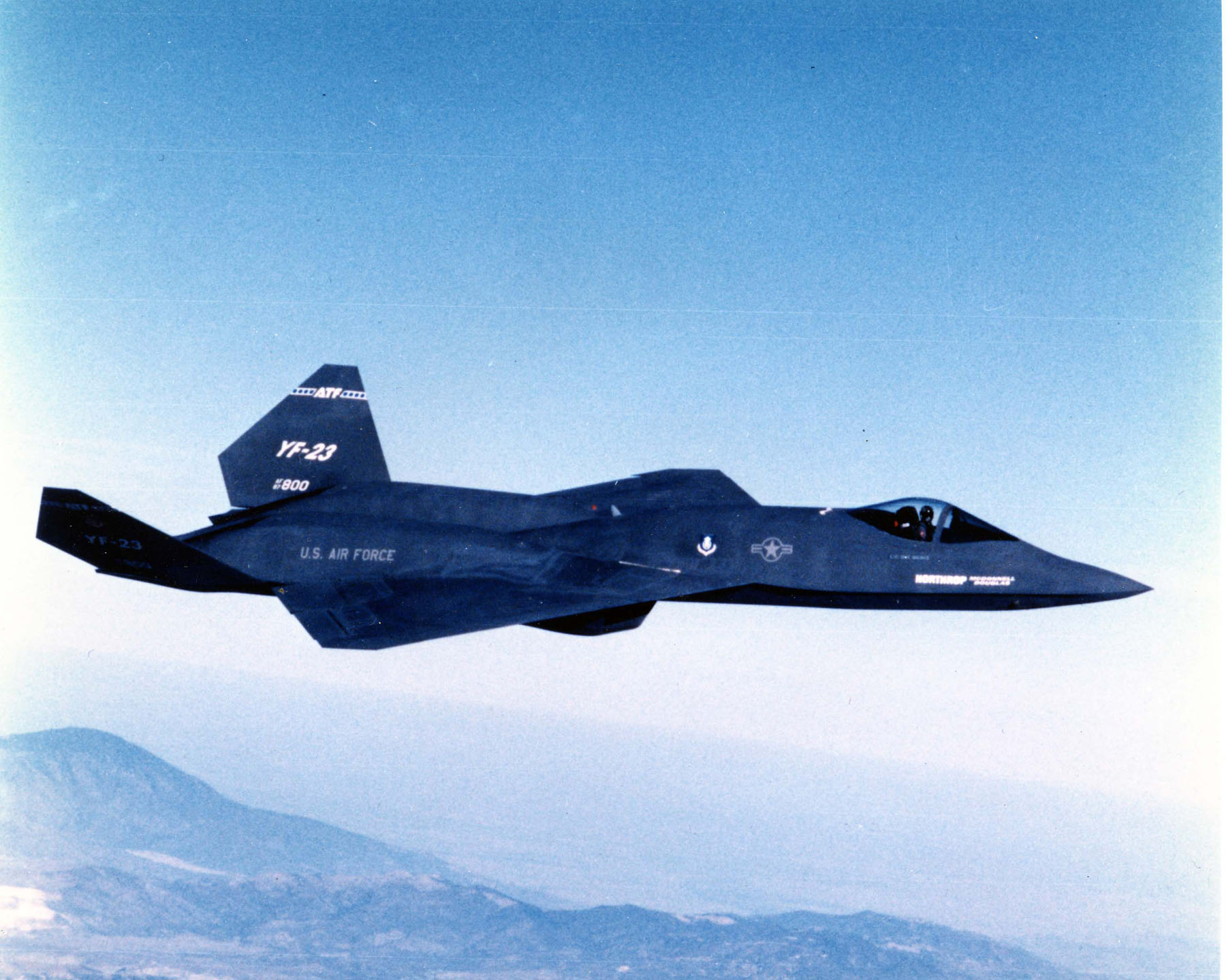
YF-23 PAV-1 in flight

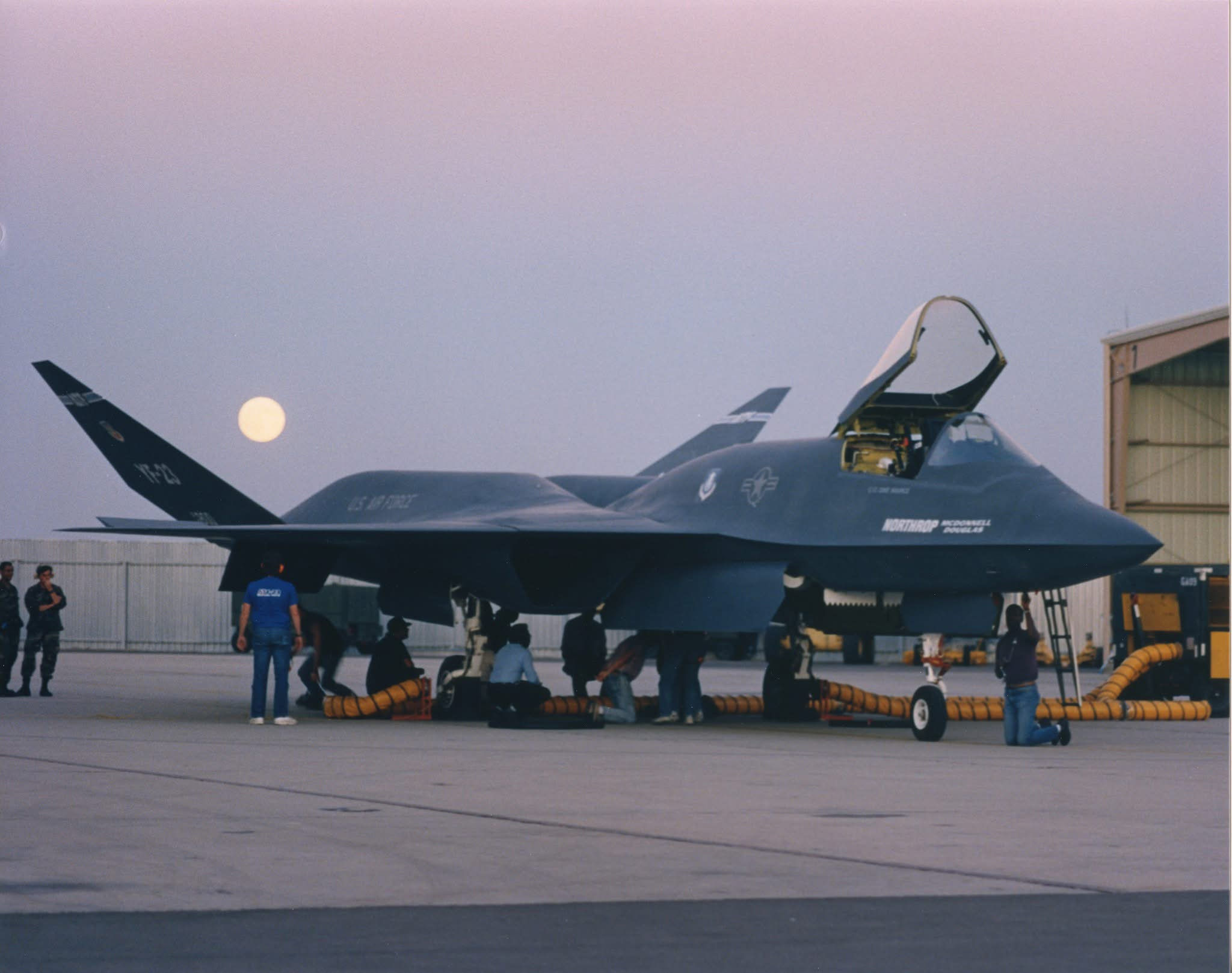
YF-23 PAV-1 with weapons bay doors open

Data from Pace, Sweetman, Winchester, Metz & Sandberg, Aronstein & Hirschberg (note, some specifications are estimated)

General characteristics

- Crew: 1
- Length: 67 ft 5 in (20.55 m)
- Wingspan: 43 ft 7 in (13.28 m)
- Height: 13 ft 11 in (4.24 m)
- Wing area: 950 sq ft (88 m^{2})
- Empty weight: 29,000 lb (13,154 kg) contractor weight (without engines)
- Gross weight: 64,000 lb (29,030 kg) takeoff, 51,320 lb (23,280 kg) combat weight
- Powerplant: 2 × Pratt & Whitney YF119-PW-100N or General Electric YF120-GE-100N afterburning turbofans, 23,500 lbf (105 kN) thrust each (YF120) dry, 30,000 or 35,000 lbf (130 or 160 kN) with afterburner

Performance

- Maximum speed: Mach 2.2, 1,452 mph (1,262 kn; 2,337 km/h) at high altitude
- Supercruise: Mach 1.72, 1,135 mph (986 kn; 1,827 km/h) at altitude
- Range: 2,400 nmi (2,800 mi, 4,500 km) ferry
- Combat range: 700–800 nmi (810–920 mi, 1,300–1,500 km)
- Service ceiling: 65,000 ft (19,800 m)
- g limits: +7.1 g (highest tested)
- Wing loading: 67.4 lb/sq ft (329 kg/m^{2}) (54 lb/sq ft at combat weight)
- Thrust/weight: 1.09 (1.36 at combat weight)

Armament
None as tested but provisions made for:

- 1 × 20 mm (0.79 in) M61 Vulcan cannon
- 4 × AIM-120 AMRAAM or AIM-7 Sparrow medium-range air-to-air missiles
- 2 × AIM-9 Sidewinder short-range air-to-air missiles

== See also ==
Aircraft of comparable role, configuration, and era

- Lockheed YF-22 – American aircraft prototype

Related lists

- List of fighter aircraft
- List of United States fighter aircraft

== Bibliography ==
=== Books ===
- Aronstein, David C.; Hirschberg, Michael J; Piccirillo, Albert C. (1998). Advanced Tactical Fighter to F-22 Raptor: Origins of the 21st Century Air Dominance Fighter. Arlington, Virginia: AIAA (American Institute of Aeronautics & Astronautics). ISBN 978-1-56347-282-4.
- Chong, Tony (2016). Flying Wings & Radical Things, Northrop's Secret Aerospace Projects & Concepts 1939-1994. Forest Lake, Minnesota: Specialty Press. ISBN 978-1-58007-229-8.
- Goodall, James C (1992). "The Lockheed YF-22 and Northrop YF-23 Advanced Tactical Fighters". America's Stealth Fighters and Bombers, B-2, F-117, YF-22, and YF-23. St. Paul, Minnesota: Motorbooks International Publishing. pp. 91–127. ISBN 9780879386092.
- Jenkins, Dennis R.; Landis, Tony R. (2008). Experimental & Prototype U.S. Air Force Jet Fighters. North Branch, Minnesota: Specialty Press. ISBN 978-1-58007-111-6.
- Metz, Alfred "Paul" (2017). Air Force Legends Number 220. Northrop YF-23 ATF. Forest Lake, Minnesota: Specialty Press. ISBN 9780989258371.
- Miller, Jay (2005). Lockheed Martin F/A-22 Raptor, Stealth Fighter. Hinckley, UK: Midland Publishing. ISBN 9781857801583.
- Pace, Steve (1999). F-22 Raptor: America's Next Lethal War Machine. New York: McGraw-Hill. ISBN 9780071342711.
- Simonsen, Erik (2016). "Wings Over the Mojave Desert: The Advanced Tactical Fighter". A Complete History of US Combat Aircraft Fly-Off Competitions. Forest Lake, Minnesota: Specialty Press. pp. 171–192. ISBN 9781580072274.
- Sweetman, Bill (1991a). YF-22 and YF-23 Advanced Tactical Fighters. St. Paul, Minnesota: Motorbooks International Publishing. ISBN 9780879385057.
- Williams, Mel, ed. (2002). "Lockheed Martin F-22A Raptor". Superfighters: The Next Generation of Combat Aircraft. London: AIRtime Publishing. pp. 4–6. ISBN 9781880588536.
- Winchester, Jim, ed. (2005). "Northrop/McDonnell Douglas YF-23". Concept Aircraft: Prototypes, X-planes, and Experimental Aircraft. Rochester, Kent, UK: Grange Books. pp. 192–201. ISBN 9781840138092.

=== Articles and interviews ===
- "YF-23 would undergo subtle changes if it wins competition". Defense Daily. 170 (8): 62–63. 14 January 1991 – via Gale.
- "ATF procurement launches new era". Flight International. Reed Business Information. 15 November 1986. pp. 10–11. Archived from the original on 24 July 2012.
- "YF-23 roll out marks ATF debut". Flight International. 27 June – 3 July 1990. Reed Business Information. p. 5. Archived from the original on 24 July 2012.
- "YF-23 re-emerges for surprise bid". Flight International. 13 July 2004. p. 6. Archived from the original on 23 July 2012.
- Cashen, John (25 April 2014). "Oral History Interview with John Cashen. Second Interview". Aerospace Oral History Project (Interview). Interviewed by Westwick, Peter. San Marino, California: The Huntington Library, Art Museum, and Botanical Gardens. Archived from the original on 15 June 2025.
- Cummings, Darold (3 August 2025). ""Christmas Tree" ATF fighter design". LinkedIn.
- Hehs, Eric (1998). "Design Evolution of the F-22, Part 1". Code One. Lockheed Martin. Archived from the original on 18 May 2024.
- Hebert, Adam J. (November 2004). "Long-Range Strike in a Hurry". Air & Space Forces Magazine. Vol. 87, no. 11. Archived from the original on 14 June 2025.
- Hebert, Adam J. (October 2006). "The 2018 Bomber and Its Friends". Air & Space Forces Magazine. Vol. 89, no. 10. Archived from the original on 25 February 2025.
- Landis, Tony (1 February 2022). Flashback: Northrop YF-23 Black Widow II (Report). Air Force Materiel Command History Office. Archived from the original on 23 May 2024.
- "Defense Ministry to develop own fighter jet to succeed F-2, may seek int'l project". Mainichi Shimbun. 4 October 2018. Archived from the original on 25 April 2019.
- Majumdar, Dave (23 January 2011). "U.S. Air Force May Buy 175 Bombers". Defense News.
- Metz, Alfred "Paul" (4 January 2022). YF-23 Advanced Tactical Fighter (ATF) – Paul Metz (Part 1). "10 Percent True" – Tales from the Cockpit. Archived from the original on 11 November 2023 – via YouTube.
- Metz, Alfred "Paul" (16 January 2022). YF-23 and F-22A – Paul Metz (Part 2). "10 Percent True" – Tales from the Cockpit. Archived from the original on 11 November 2023 – via YouTube.
- Metz, Alfred "Paul"; Sandberg, Jim (27 August 2015). YF-23 DEM/VAL Presentation by Test Pilots Paul Metz and Jim Sandberg. Western Museum of Flight, Torrance, California: Peninsula Seniors Production. Archived from the original on 14 October 2023.
- Mizokami, Kyle (9 July 2018). "Now Northrop Grumman Wants to Build Japan's New Fighter Jet". Popular Mechanics. Archived from the original on 23 May 2024.
- "YF-23 Photo Gallery". NASA Dryden Flight Research Center. 20 January 1996. Archived from the original on 5 June 1997.
- Norris, Guy. "NASA could rescue redundant YF-23s". Flight International. 5 – 11 June 1991. Reed Business Information. p. 16. Archived from the original on 21 May 2011.
- Northrop Corporation v. General Motors Corporation and Allison Engine Company, Inc., 49A02-0205-CV-428 (Court of Appeals of Indiana 27 April 2004), archived from the original on 12 December 2024.
- "Northrop-McDonnell Douglas YF-23A Black Widow II". National Museum of the U.S. Air Force. Archived from the original on 30 May 2023.
- "Quadrennial Defense Review Report" (PDF). U.S. Department of Defense. 6 February 2006. Archived from the original (PDF) on 15 February 2007.
- Rich, Michael; Stanley, William (April 1984). "Improving U.S. Air Force Readiness and Sustainability" (PDF). RAND Corporation. Archived from the original (PDF) on 2 July 2023.
- "Memorial Day's service will include unveiling of plane". St. Louis Post-Dispatch (Main ed.). St. Louis, Missouri. 24 May 2001. p. 100 – via Newspapers.com.
- Sweetman, Bill (1991b). "The Fighter They Didn't Want". World Air Power Journal. 7 (Autumn/Winter 1991). London: Aerospace Publishing: 32–41. ISBN 9781874023135. ISSN 0959-7050.
- Report to the Chairman, Committee on Armed Services, House of Representatives: Navy's Participation in Air Force's Advanced Tactical Fighter Program (PDF) (Report). United States Government Accounting Office. March 1990. Archived from the original (PDF) on 17 June 2024.
- "Static Displays". Western Museum of Flight. Archived from the original on 15 July 2019.
- "Northrop YF-23A "Black Widow II"". Western Museum of Flight. Archived from the original on 15 July 2019.
- YF-23 Walk Around and Design Features by Test Pilot Paul Metz. Western Museum of Flight, Torrance, California: Peninsula Seniors Productions. 6 September 2015. Event occurs at 7:20. Archived from the original on 21 November 2023 – via YouTube.
