= Next-Generation Bomber =

US program to develop a new medium bomber

- Boeing/Lockheed Martin "2018 Bomber" concept image

General information
- Project for: Stealth bomber
- Issued by: United States Air Force

History
- Outcome: Canceled
- Successors: Long Range Strike Bomber

The Next-Generation Bomber (NGB; unofficially called the 2018 Bomber or B-3 Bomber) was a program to develop a new medium bomber for the United States Air Force. The NGB was initially projected to enter service around 2018 as a stealthy, subsonic, medium-range, medium payload bomber to supplement and possibly—to a limited degree—replace the U.S. Air Force's aging bomber fleet (B-52 Stratofortress and B-1 Lancer). The Long Range Strike Bomber (LRS-B) heavy bomber program superseded the NGB program.

== Development ==
=== 1999 Air Force White Paper on Long Range Bombers controversy ===
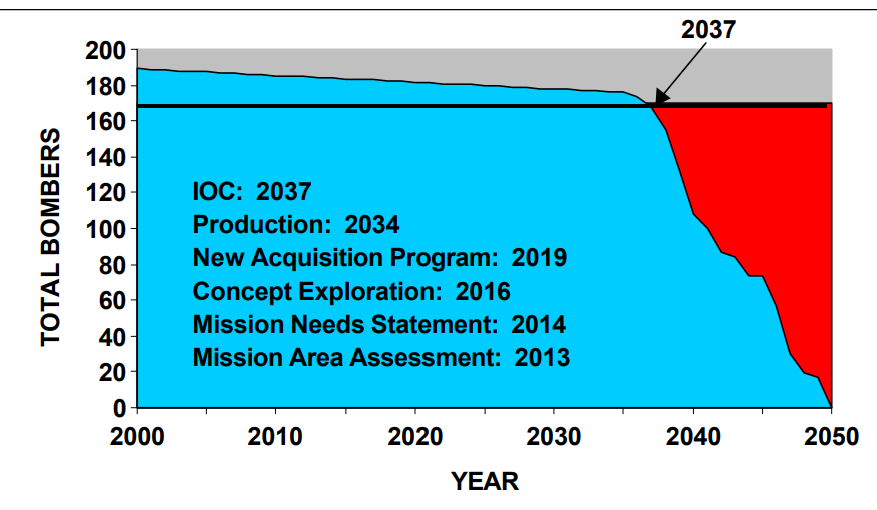
1999 Long Range Bombers projection

In 1999, the Air Force released a white paper stating that it would need a new "capability" around 2037 to replace retiring bombers. The paper estimated that due to mishap attrition and other factors other than useful service life, the number of B-1 Lancer would not meet Air Force requirements of 89 aircraft by 2018. For the B-2, the number of aircraft would slip below the service's requirements of 19 aircraft by 2027 due to a combination of mishaps and retirements due to the end of service life. It predicted it would need to begin retiring B-1s at the end of their service life around 2038.

The Department of the Air Force's contentment with the size and age of the bomber fleet disappointed some members of Congress who believed a new aircraft would be needed before 2035. The case for a hastened timeline was bolstered, some observers believed, by the DoD's 2001 Quadrennial Defense Review, which warned of increasing threats to U.S. power projection. The report said developments in adversary air defenses would threaten U.S. air power in future conflicts, and that access to enemy denied areas would be limited to stealth aircraft.

The Air Force conceded that a new bomber would be needed earlier when it updated its service life projections in November 2001. The new paper anticipated a capability gap due to a strategic shift from nuclear deterrence to conventional bombing, and the loss of B-52's low-level flying mission capability. The paper said the Air Force would need to begin its acquisition program in 2012–2015. The paper's recommendations were adopted as Air Force policy by Under Secretary of Defense for Acquisition and Sustainment Edward C. Aldridge Jr. Internally, some Air Force officials also considered filling the gap by complementing the aging strategic bomber force with an interim "regional bomber", such as the proposed Lockheed Martin FB-22, Northrop Grumman FB-23, and Boeing B-1R.

=== 2018 Bomber ===
In June 2003, Jane's Defence Weekly reported upon ongoing study efforts within the Office of the Secretary of Defense and USAF Air Staff to prepare to start a new long-range strike system, which would not necessarily be an aircraft (other options being discussed included ultra-high-speed munitions), that could mature technologies in the 2012-15 timeframe in order to transfer into a developmental program.

The sinking of ex-USS Schenectady as a test during Operation Resultant Fury in 2004 demonstrated that heavy bombers could successfully engage naval targets on their own. This led to the requirement for a new bomber that could survive against modern defenses. In 2004–2006, the USAF Air Combat Command studied alternatives for a new bomber type aircraft to augment the current bomber fleet which now consists of largely 1970s era airframes, with a goal of having a fully operational aircraft on the ramp by 2018. Some speculation suggested that the next generation bomber might be hypersonic and unmanned. However, these were put to rest when US Air Force Major General Mark T. Matthews, head of ACC Plans and Programs stated that available technology indicates a manned subsonic bomber at a May 2007 Air Force Association sponsored event. He later stated that a manned subsonic bomber provides the "best value" to meet the required range and payload performance by 2018.

The 2006 Quadrennial Defense Review (QDR), directed the Air Force to develop a new long-range precision strike capability by 2018; the previous "regional bomber" concepts were also dropped in this QDR. USAF officials identified the new bomber as having top-end low-observability characteristics with the ability to loiter for hours over the battlefield area and respond to threats as they appear. Major General David E Clary, ACC vice-commander, summed it up by saying the new bomber would "penetrate and persist". Deployment of cruise missiles was another issue for the new bomber. The B-52 is the only aircraft currently in the Air Force inventory allowed under strategic nuclear arms reduction treaty to be armed with nuclear cruise missiles. Major consideration was paid to operation readiness and flexibility. In 2006, the program expected that a prototype could be flying as early as 2009. In September 2007, several Air Force generals stressed that it was still their plan to field the bomber by 2018. In order to meet the tight schedule, the Air Force would initially pursue a basic model then improves its capabilities subsequently.

On 25 January 2008, Boeing and Lockheed Martin announced an agreement to embark on a joint effort to develop a new US Air Force strategic bomber, with plans for it to be in service by 2018. This collaborative effort for a long-range strike program will include work in advanced sensors and future electronic warfare solutions, including advancements in network-enabled battle management, command and control, and virtual warfare simulation and experimentation. Under their joint arrangement, Boeing, the No. 2 Pentagon supplier, would be the primary contractor with about a 60% share, and Lockheed Martin, the world's largest defense contractor, would have around a 40% share, according to sources familiar with the companies' plans. Northrop Grumman, another major defense contractor, received $2 billion in funding in 2008 for "restricted programs" – also called black programs – for a demonstrator that could fly in 2010.

The Air Force was expected to announce late in 2009 its precise requirements for a new bomber that would be operating by 2018. In May 2009, testimony before Congress, US Secretary of Defense Robert Gates mentioned that the Pentagon was considering a pilotless aircraft for the next-generation bomber role.

=== Move to LRS-B ===
In April 2009, Defense Secretary Gates announced a delay in the new generation bomber project that would push it past the 2018 date. This was caused not only by budget considerations as the NGB was already experiencing spiraling costs due to numerous mission additions and requirements creep, but also by nuclear arms treaty considerations. On 19 May 2009, Air Force Chief of Staff General Norton Schwartz said that the USAF's focus in the 2010 budget was on "Long-range strike, not next-generation bomber" and will push for this in the QDR. In June 2009, the two teams working on NGB proposals were told to "close up shop". On 1 March 2010, Boeing said that the joint project with Lockheed Martin had been suspended and on 24 June 2010, Lieutenant General Philip M. Breedlove said that the term "next-generation bomber" was dead and that the Air Force was working on a long-range strike "family" that would draw on the capabilities of systems like the F-35 and F-22 to help a more affordable and versatile bomber complete its missions.

On 13 September 2010, U.S. Air Force Secretary Michael Donley said that long range strike would continue cautiously with proven technologies and that the plan to be submitted with the 2012 budget could call for either a missile or an aircraft. The bomber is to be nuclear-capable, but not certified for nuclear use until later. On 24 February 2012, Air Force Secretary Michael Donley announced that a competition was under way with a target delivery in the mid-2020s. On 27 October 2015, Northrop Grumman was awarded the contract to build the new bomber.

== Design ==
The design goals in January 2011 were:

- Total program cost estimated at $40 to $50 billion.
- Fleet size of 175 aircraft: 120 for ten combat squadrons, plus 55 for training and reserves.
- Subsonic maximum speed.
- Range: 5,000+ nautical miles (9,260+ km).
- "Optionally manned" (for non-nuclear missions).
- Total mission durations of 50 to 100 hours (when unmanned).
- Ability to "survive daylight raids in heavily defended enemy territory".
- Ability to carry thermonuclear weapons.
- Designed to use commercial off-the-shelf propulsion, C4ISTAR, and radar technologies.
- Intelligence, surveillance, target acquisition, and aerial reconnaissance along with command and control gear to enable the crew to direct other aircraft and forces.

An August 2008 paper by Northrop Grumman highlighted the following trends and requirements:

- Airfields available for American use have declined since the Cold War.
- Hostile cruise and ballistic missiles could shut down the few available airfields.
- Fewer fighter aircraft will be available to escort the bomber force.
- Advanced fighter aircraft and surface to air missiles are being made available to potentially hostile states.
- The existing USAF bomber force was small and largely outdated.

== See also ==
- Northrop Grumman B-21 Raider
- 2037 bomber controversy
- Long Range Strike Bomber program

Aircraft of comparable role, configuration, and era

- Northrop Grumman B-2 Spirit

Related lists

- List of bomber aircraft

== Bibliography ==
- Grant, Dr. Rebecca (February 2007), Return of the Bomber, The Future of Long-Range Strike (PDF), Air Force Association, archived from the original (PDF) on 29 June 2011
- Rose, William 'Bill' (2010), Secret Projects: Flying Wings and Tailless Aircraft, Hinckley, England, UK: Midland
