= Lockheed Martin FB-22 =

Proposed bomber aircraft for the U.S. Air Force derived from the F-22 Raptor

FB-22
- Lockheed Martin imagery of the FB-22-4 design as of 2005

General information
- Type: Stealth regional bomber
- National origin: United States
- Manufacturer: Lockheed Martin Aeronautics, Boeing Integrated Defense Systems
- Status: Design proposal, canceled

History
- Developed from: Lockheed Martin F-22 Raptor

The Lockheed Martin FB-22 (Note: The "F/B-22" and "F/B-22A" designations were also used.) was a proposed supersonic stealth bomber aircraft for the United States Air Force, derived from the F-22 Raptor air superiority fighter. Lockheed Martin proposed its design in the early 2000s with support from certain Air Force leaders as an interim "regional bomber" to complement the aging U.S. strategic bomber fleet, whose replacement was planned to enter service after 2037. The FB-22 was to leverage much of the design work and components from the F-22 to reduce development costs.

Lockheed Martin suspended work on the concept following the 2006 Quadrennial Defense Review, which called for a new and much larger strategic Next-Generation Bomber by 2018; this program later morphed into the Long Range Strike Bomber.

== Background ==
In March 1999, the Air Force released a Long Range Bombers white paper in response to a Congressional mandate for the service to update its bomber roadmap. The paper stated that the service's current fleet of strategic bombers consisting of the B-52, B-1, and B-2 would be sufficient until around 2037, when they will need to be replaced by a new "capability" with an acquisition program starting in 2019. However, this target date frustrated members of Congress who hoped to see greater budgetary emphasis on the bomber mission. Furthermore, the subsequent 2001 Department of Defense (DoD) Quadrennial Defense Review identified increasing threats to U.S. power projection, and the Air Force's aging bomber fleet. One of the key threats identified by the review was the increasing prevalence of sophisticated air defense systems which could deny airspace access to any aircraft without stealth capability. In November 2001, the Air Force released an updated white paper on Long Range Strike Aircraft, which acknowledged these challenges and also anticipated a strategic shift from nuclear deterrence to conventional precision bombing and network-centric warfare for global power projection in potentially unexpected conflict zones. Although the updated paper identified the possibility of a replacement "capability" entering service in the 2025 to 2030 timeframe, it cautioned that this was not an in-depth or detailed bomber roadmap. Against this backdrop, some Air Force officials began considering an "interim" strike capability such as "regional bombers" to complement the existing fleet of strategic bombers while the service and the DoD explored ideas and timelines for a longer term replacement program.

== Design and development ==
In 2001, Lockheed Martin began internal studies on the feasibility of the FB-22 as the company sought to leverage the design and capabilities of the F-22 Raptor, the result of the Advanced Tactical Fighter program. The studies primarily focused on the ability to survive and perform bombing missions (i.e. air interdiction) in contested environments, in both day and night, against increasingly capable air defense systems and adversary fighter aircraft. Furthermore, experience gleaned from Operation Enduring Freedom in Afghanistan also demonstrated the value of a bomber that could reach targets quickly and remain in theatre in the absence of surface-to-air missiles. The F-22, while designed as an air superiority fighter, embodied some degree of air-to-ground attack ability through precision strikes with Joint Direct Attack Munitions (JDAM), with further strike capability improvements planned with upgrades. Though initially unsolicited, the studies attracted the attention of several Air Force leaders, including Secretary of the Air Force James Roche in 2002.

One primary objective of the internal studies was to exploit and further expand upon the F-22's high speed air-to-ground capability while keeping costs to a minimum. To this end, the company devised several concepts that saw significant structural redesigns with respect to the fuselage and wings, while retaining much of the F-22's mission system avionics. With an early design later designated FB-22-1, Lockheed Martin lengthened and widened the fuselage to increase the internal weapons load; another design, the FB-22-2, had a stretched mid-fuselage for increased main bay capacity and featured an enlarged delta wing with greater leading edge sweep angle while the horizontal tails (stabilators) were removed. However, it was later found that doing so would have incurred a cost penalty of 25–30% in weight, materials and development. Instead, the company subsequently focused on leaving the fuselage intact as much as possible while enlarging the diamond-like delta wing with the same sweep angles as the F-22.

Various FB-22 proposals from Lockheed Martin, with the later proposals retaining the stock F-22 fuselage to reduce costs.

Several proposals in this vein were investigated. The FB-22-3 used the stock fuselage with enlarged delta wings and no stabilators, while the FB-22-4 was similar to -3 but with maximal wing whose leading edge met with the upper edge of the caret inlet. The FB-22-4's maximal wing, which was around three times that of the F-22, enabled the storage of a much larger quantity of weapons and fuel. In addition, as a stealth bomber, the FB-22 was designed to carry weapons externally while maintaining stealth with the assistance of detachable and faceted pods dubbed "wing weapons bay"; previously, an aircraft could only remain stealthy if it carried its weapons internally. Various figures give the payload of the FB-22 to be 30 to 35 Small Diameter Bombs; this is compared to the F-22's payload of eight of such 250-pound (110 kg) weapons. The main weapon bay doors would also be bulged to allow internal carriage of 2,000-pound (910 kg) bombs in the fuselage. By employing the wing weapons bay, the FB-22 was designed to be able to carry bombs up to 5,000 pounds (2,270 kg) in size such as the GBU-37 GPS-Aided Munition (GAM) or two 2,000-pound bombs in tandem. With stealth, the aircraft's maximum combat load was to have been 15,000 pounds (6,800 kg); without stealth, 30,000 pounds (13,600 kg).

Lockheed Martin imagery of the FB-22-4 from the bottom, showing the extended forward fuselage, wing weapons bays and the bulged main weapon bay doors.

Combat radius was almost tripled from about 600 nautical miles (690 mi; 1,100 km) to more than 1,600 nautical miles (1,800 mi; 3,000 km), which could have been extended further by the use of external fuel tanks. This range capability placed the aircraft in the category of a regional bomber, comparable to that of the F-111, as it was intended to replace the F-15E Strike Eagle and take over some of the missions of the B-1 and B-2. With the FB-22's greatly increased range and endurance, Lockheed Martin also extended the forward fuselage by 60 inches (1.5 m) to accommodate a second pilot in order to reduce workload and also act as a weapon systems officer (WSO). According to Air Force Magazine, the combination of range and payload of the FB-22 would have given the concept a comparable effectiveness to that of the B-2 armed with 2,000-lb bombs. The design was to still use the Pratt & Whitney F119 engines but modified for more power and optimized for subsonic efficiency rather than supercruise. (Note: The design might also have been adapted to use an even more powerful engine, such as the F-35 Lightning II's Pratt & Whitney F135, or the General Electric/Rolls-Royce F136.) While some FB-22 concepts featured no tailplanes (using research originally under the X-44 MANTA program), most design proposals incorporated twin tailplanes and likely would have fixed axisymmetric engine nozzles as opposed to the rectangular thrust vectoring nozzles on the F-22. Though not designed for supercruise, the FB-22 would be capable of supersonic dash using afterburners. Projected maximum speed varied depending on the variant; faster versions such as the FB-22-2 would have had a top speed of Mach 1.92, while the FB-22-4 with maximal wing area would have topped out at around Mach 1.5. Because the aircraft was to emphasize air-to-ground capability while maintaining stealth characteristics, the FB-22 would have lacked the F-22's dogfighting capability although it could carry AIM-9 Sidewinders and AIM-120 AMRAAMs for self-defense against fighters.

One aspect that arose during the early stages of the design process was the consideration that Boeing would be responsible for the final assembly of the aircraft. At the time, Lockheed Martin was making the mid-fuselage at its plant in Fort Worth, Texas, while assembling the F-22 in Marietta, Georgia. However, since Boeing was responsible for the manufacturing of parts of the fuselage and more crucially, the wings—as well as integrating the avionics—it was considered prudent to give final assembly to Boeing in Seattle, Washington. Other than the wings, the aircraft would have retained much of the design of the F-22. This included 80% of the avionics, software, and flight controls. This commonality would have also significantly reduced the costs of software integration.

Lockheed Martin photo of an FB-22-3 model on Air Force Secretary James Roche's desk

In February 2003, during a session with the House Committee on Armed Services, Air Force Secretary James Roche said that he envisioned a force of 150 FB-22s would equip the service. In 2004, Lockheed Martin officially presented the FB-22 to the Air Force to meet its requirement for a potential strategic bomber as an interim solution to become operational by 2018. Because of the work already done on the F-22, the cost of developing the FB-22 was estimated to be as low as 25% of developing a new bomber, with development expected to be US$5–7 billion (2002 dollars, ~$8.31 billion–11.6 billion in 2024), including the airframe development cost of US$1 billion (2003 dollars, ~$1.63 billion in 2024). It was later revealed that six different versions of the bomber were submitted, as targets, payload and range had yet to be defined. Competing concepts include the Boeing B-1R and the Northrop Grumman FB-23. However, the FB-22 in its planned form was canceled in the wake of the 2006 Quadrennial Defense Review and subsequent developments as the Department of Defense favored a new strategic bomber with much greater range that would enter service in 2018. The Air Force would subsequently embark on the Next-Generation Bomber program to fulfill this goal, although the program was later re-scoped and became the Long Range Strike Bomber program resulting in the B-21 Raider.

== Specifications (FB-22-4, proposed) ==
Data from Lockheed Martin, Aerofax, Air Force Association

General characteristics

- Crew: 2 (pilot, co-pilot/weapon systems operator)
- Length: 64 ft 4 in (19.61 m)
- Wingspan: 73 ft 8 in (22.45 m)
- Wing area: 1,757 sq ft (163.2 m^{2})
- Airfoil: 4.45% thickness
- Max takeoff weight: 120,000 lb (54,431 kg)
- Fuel capacity: 43,745 lb (19,842 kg) internal
- Powerplant: 2 × modified Pratt & Whitney F119 afterburning turbofan (Note: The modified F119 engines would likely have had round axisymmetric nozzles and not optimized for supercruise.)

Performance

- Maximum speed: Mach 1.5+ at altitude (Note: Faster proposed variants such as the FB-22-2 was to have a higher top speed of Mach 1.92.)
- Range: 3,600 nmi (4,100 mi, 6,700 km)
- Combat range: 1,477 nmi (1,700 mi, 2,735 km) (combat radius with 100 nmi supersonic dash)
  - 1,574 nautical miles (1,810 mi; 2,920 km) (combat radius with 50 nmi supersonic dash)
  - 1,800 nautical miles (2,070 mi; 3,330 km) subsonic
- g limits: +6 g

Armament

- Hardpoints: 8 internal hardpoints in three weapons bays, 4 underwing hardpoints with a capacity of 15,000 lb (6,800 kg) internal and in LO wing weapons bays, 30,000 lb (13,600 kg) total
- Missiles:
  - Internal loadout: 6 × AIM-120 AMRAAM (2 × AIM-120 when carrying bombs) and 2 × AIM-9 Sidewinder (no AIM-9s when carrying SDBs in side bays)
  - Wing pylons: 4 × AIM-120 AMRAAM and 2 × AGM-154 JSOW or 2 AGM-158 JASSM
- Bombs:
  - Internal loadout: 12 × GBU-39 Small Diameter Bombs (SDB) or 2 × GBU-31/32 Joint Direct Attack Munitions (JDAM)
  - Wing pylons: 12 x GBU-39 SDBs in LO wing weapons bays or 2 × GBU-31/32 JDAMs or 2 × GBU-37 GPS-Aided Munitions (GAM)

== See also ==
- Advanced Tactical Fighter
- 2037 bomber controversy

Related development

- Lockheed YF-22
- Lockheed Martin F-22 Raptor
- Lockheed Martin X-44 MANTA

Aircraft of comparable role, configuration, and era

- General Dynamics FB-111
- General Dynamics F-16XL
- JH-XX
- McDonnell Douglas F-15E Strike Eagle
- Sukhoi Su-34
- Sukhoi T-60S
- Boeing B-1R
- Northrop Grumman FB-23

Related lists

- List of bomber aircraft
