= 2037 bomber controversy =

Aircraft planned by the U.S. Air Force

2037 bomber

General information
- Issued by: United States Air Force
- Status: Projected

History
- Successors: Next-Generation Bomber; Long Range Strike Bomber

The 2037 bomber was a short-lived 1999 United States Air Force proposal to modernize and extend the service life of the U.S. bomber fleet and defer the introduction of a replacement "capability" (a strategic bomber or some future equivalent platform) until 2037. The plan was criticized by lawmakers and Pentagon officials, some of whom believed the existing fleet was in danger of becoming outmoded and overstretched. Amidst this controversy, Air Force officials revised this plan in 2001 to put forward an accelerated timeline for a new bomber. Accordingly, a Next-Generation Bomber program was started with the goal of introducing a bomber in 2018, but this was canceled in 2009. This program was restarted as the Long Range Strike Bomber which resulted in the Northrop Grumman B-21 Raider, currently expected to enter service in 2026–2027.

== B-2 production termination and looming bomber gap ==
In 1998, a Congressional panel studied the merits of re-starting B-2 Spirit production, which had ended prematurely at 21 aircraft, far short of the originally planned 132 stealth bombers. The panel nonetheless endorsed ending production in favor of re-allocating resources towards B-2 upgrades or developing technology for a future new-build aircraft.

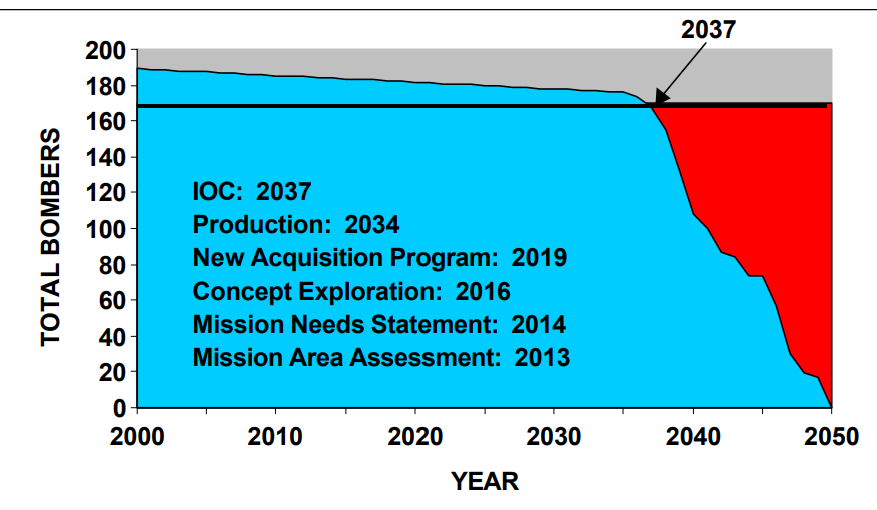
1999 Long Range Bombers projection

A few weeks later Congress ordered the Department of the Air Force to update its bomber roadmap, last reviewed in 1992. The resulting Long Range Bombers white paper released in March 1999 projected that a new "capability" would be needed to be fielded in the 2037 time frame. The paper estimated that due to mishap attrition and other factors other than useful service life, the number of B-1 Lancer would not meet Air Force requirements of 89 aircraft by 2018. For the B-2, the number of aircraft would slip below the service's requirements of 19 aircraft by 2027 due to a combination of mishaps and retirements due to end of service life. It predicted it would need to begin retiring B-1s at the end of their service life around 2038. For the B-52 Stratofortresses, the report estimated the service would be "unable to maintain our requirement of 62 aircraft by 2044." The Air Force's near-term strategic bombing needs could be met through service extensions and technology enhancements offering "a tenfold increase in bomber lethality" compared to 1992, according to the paper. According to that roadmap, a Mission Area Assessment would have to be completed by 2013 with an acquisition program beginning in 2019 in order to support initial operational capability (IOC) in 2037.

The white paper did not identify the replacement "capability" as a bomber or any specific type of aircraft because, according to the report, "technological advances may lead us to a configuration or platform that in no way resembles today’s bomber aircraft."

The Department of the Air Force's contentment with the size and age of the bomber fleet disappointed some members of Congress who believed a new aircraft would be needed before 2037. The case for a hastened timeline was bolstered, some observers believed, by the Department of Defense's 2001 Quadrennial Defense Review, which warned of increasing threats to U.S. power projection. The report said developments in adversary air defenses would threaten U.S. air power in future conflicts, and that access to enemy denied areas would be limited to stealth aircraft.

The Air Force conceded that a new bomber would be needed earlier when it updated its service life projections in November 2001. In addition to acknowledging the threats discussed in the QDR report, the new paper anticipated a capability gap due to a strategic shift from nuclear deterrence to conventional bombing, and the loss of B-52's low-level flying mission capability. The paper identified the possibility for the Air Force to begin its acquisition program in 2012–2015 to support IOC in the 2025–2030 timeframe. The paper's recommendations were adopted as Air Force policy by Under Secretary of Defense for Acquisition and Sustainment Edward C. Aldridge Jr.

== Legacy ==
The Department of Defense continued to advocate for a later bomber introduction date. In its Nuclear Posture Review delivered in December 2001, the DoD claimed the Air Force was aiming to introduce its next bomber in the 2040s; internally, this gap still caused concern and some Air Force officials expressed support for complementing the existing strategic bomber fleet with an "interim" strike capability fulfilled by "regional bombers", such as the proposed Lockheed Martin FB-22, Northrop Grumman FB-23, or Boeing B-1R. Not until the 2006 Quadrennial Defense Review did the DoD formalize its intent to bring the project forward almost two decades.

The Air Force next began the Next-Generation Bomber program with a target service entry date in 2018, but this was suspended in 2009. Work resumed under the Long Range Strike Bomber program (LRS-B), which resulted in the Northrop Grumman B-21 Raider.

Debates persist within the Air Force ranks about the 2037 bomber and the future of long-range strike. The Air Force's interest, or lack thereof, in a follow-on bomber to the LRS-B has not been publicly divulged. In 2007, defense industry analyst Rebecca Grant called the bomber a "mythical beast" and lamented the Air Force's continued fixation on it.

== See also ==
- Next-Generation Bomber
