= Lockheed Martin X-44 MANTA =

Conceptual aircraft design by Lockheed Martin

X-44 MANTA
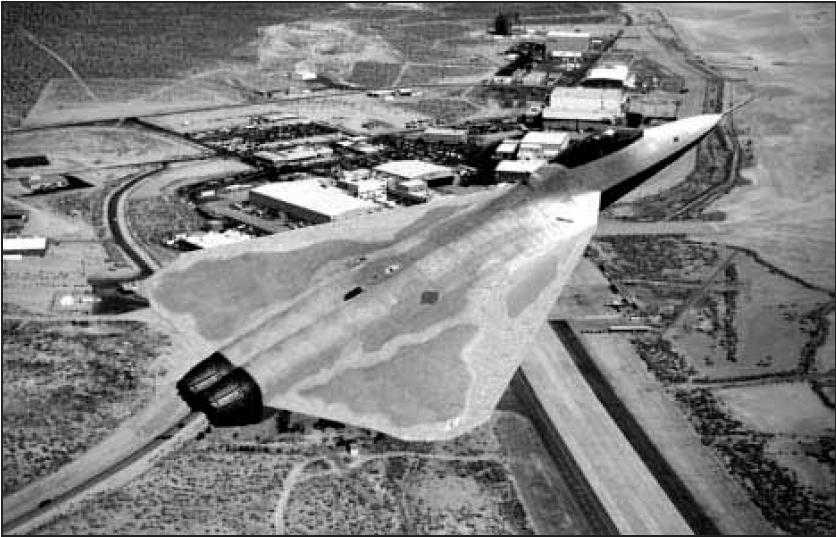
- NASA concept art of the X-44 in flight

General information
- Type: Experimental tailless aircraft
- National origin: United States
- Manufacturer: Lockheed Martin
- Status: Proposed design, canceled

History
- Developed from: Lockheed Martin F-22 Raptor

The Lockheed Martin X-44 MANTA (Multi-Axis No-Tail Aircraft) was an American conceptual aircraft design by Lockheed Martin that was studied by NASA and the U.S. Air Force. It was intended to test the feasibility of full yaw, pitch and roll authority without tailplanes (horizontal or vertical). Attitude control would rely purely on 3D thrust vectoring. The aircraft design was derived from the F-22 Raptor and featured a stretched delta wing without tail surfaces.

== History ==
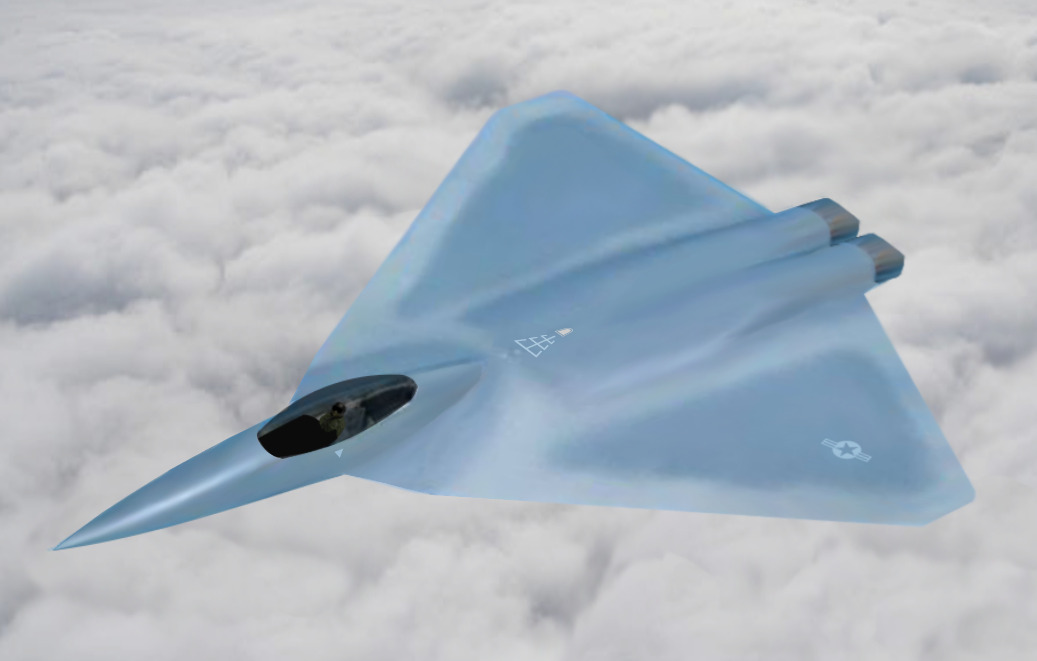
Artist's impression of the X-44

NASA and the U.S. Air Force had begun preliminary work on the aircraft by May 1999. Plans called for MANTA technologies to be demonstrated on either an F-22 Raptor or F-15. An X-44 prototype would begin test flights by fiscal year 2007. NASA planners stated that developing technologies for the X-44 could have application to the F-22 and Joint Strike Fighter programs and commercial supersonic ventures.

Initial feasibility work was funded by government and two contractors. NASA approved the program to start in June 1999, giving the aircraft the designation "X-44A". Funding for the X-44 ended in 2000. Some of the subsequent FB-22 proposals had considered having no tailplanes and would have continued the research from the MANTA program.

== Design and development ==
Planning documents called for an aircraft that "leapfrogs state-of-the-art." The X-44 was designed by Lockheed Martin to demonstrate the feasibility of an aircraft controlled by vectored thrust alone. The X-44 design had a reduced radar signature (due to lack of tail and vertical stabilizers) and was made more efficient by eliminating the tail and rudder surfaces, and instead using thrust vectors to provide yaw, pitch and roll control.

The X-44 MANTA design was based on the F-22. The engine and fuselage would be carried over to the X-44. Major differences included the delta wing shape and tail-less design. Plans called for the elimination of flight control surfaces. Yaw, pitch and roll authority would be accomplished through thrust-vectoring, possibly by modifying the extant 2-D vectoring nozzles of the F-22. These changes would in effect be combining the control and propulsion systems. The X-44 MANTA would have a greater fuel capacity than the F-22, due to its larger delta wing design. The MANTA was designed to have reduced mechanical complexity, increased fuel efficiency and greater agility.

== See also ==
- Advanced Tactical Fighter – U.S. Air Force stealth air superiority fighter program
- McDonnell Douglas A-12 Avenger II – Proposed carrier-based strike aircraft

Related development

- Lockheed YF-22 – American aircraft prototype
- Lockheed Martin F-22 Raptor – American stealth air superiority fighter
- Lockheed Martin FB-22 – Proposed bomber aircraft for the U.S. Air Force derived from the F-22 Raptor
