= Bill Sweetman =

American military historian

Bill Sweetman (born 1956 in Basingstoke, Hampshire, UK) is a former editor for Jane's and currently an editor for Aviation Week group. He is a writer of more than 50 books on military aircraft. He lives in Oakdale, Minnesota. He is noted for his dogged pursuit of the Aurora project. He appeared as an Aerospace Consultant on in the Nova PBS TV program "Battle of the X-Planes" about the Joint Strike Fighter Program. At one point, it was estimated that over forty percent of articles referenced in Soviet aerospace works were written by or associated with him.

== Works ==
=== Articles written by Sweetman ===
- Article written by Sweetman for Janes.com

=== Books ===
(partial; from a 2-page list at ThriftBooks.com)

- 100 Years of Flight
- A History of Passenger Aircraft, 1979
- A-10 Thunderbolt II (Modern Fighting Aircraft)
- Advanced Fighter Technology: The Future of Cockpit Combat
- Aircraft 2000 : the future of aerospace technology
- Attack Helicopters: The Ah-64 Apaches (War Planes)
- Aurora: The Pentagon's Secret Hypersonic Spyplane (Mil-Tech Series)
- Avro Lancaster
- Classic Collection: 100 Years of Flight & Classic Airplanes
- Combat Rescue Helicopters: The Mh-53 Pave Lows (Edge Books)
- F-22 Raptor (Enthusiast Color Series)
- High Speed Flight
- High-Altitude Spy Planes: The U-2s (War Planes)
- Inside the Stealth Bomber (Motorbooks ColorTech)
- Joint Strike Fighter: Boeing X-32 vs Lockheed Martin X-35 (Enthusiast)
- Jump Jets: The Av-8B Harriers (War Planes)
- Lockheed F-117A: Operation and Development of the Stealth Fighter
- Lockheed Stealth
- Migs (High Performance Series)
- Mosquito
- Phantom (Jane's Aircraft Spectacular Series)
- Radar Jammers: The Ea-6B Prowlers (War Planes)
- Soviet Air Power
- Soviet X-Planes (with Yefim Gordon)
- Spitfire
- Stealth Aircraft: Secrets of Future Airpower
- Stealth bomber: invisible warplane, black budget
- Stealth Bombers: The B-2 Spirits (War Planes)
- Stealth: United States Air Force's Invisible Warplanes
- Strike Fighters: The F/A-18E/F Super Hornets (War Planes)
- Supersonic Fighters: The F-16 Fighting Falcons (War Planes)
- The Hamyln concise guide to Soviet military aircraft
- Ultimate Fighter: Lockheed Martin F-35 Joint Strike Fighter
- United States Naval Air Power
- YF-22 and YF-23: Advanced Tactical Fighters: Stealth, Speed and Agility for Air Superiority
