= Long Range Strike Bomber =

US Air Force program in support of Northrop Grumman B-21 Raider development

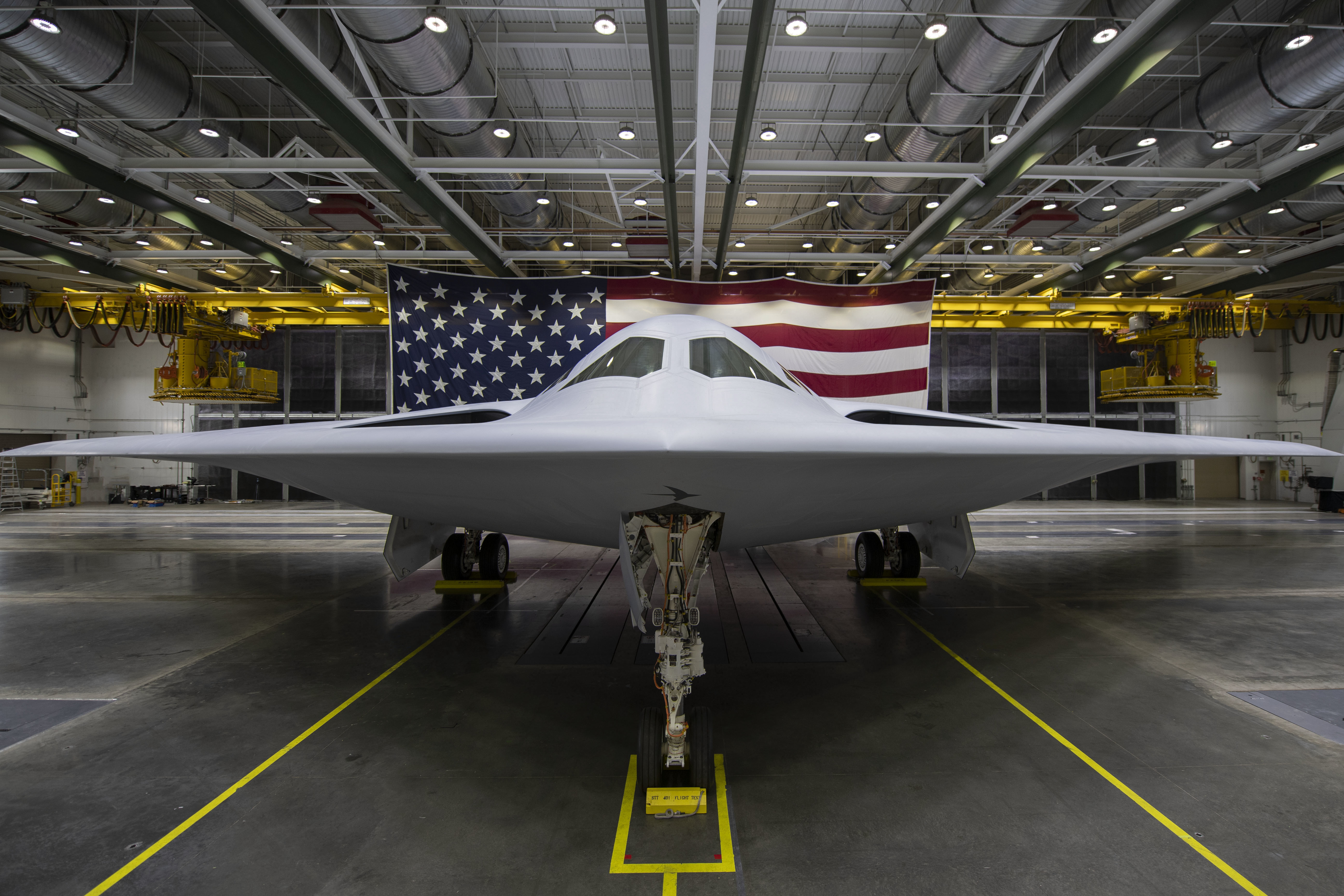
- The B-21 Raider was developed as a result of the program

General information
- Project for: Strategic stealth bomber
- Issued by: United States Air Force
- Proposals: • Boeing/Lockheed Martin • Northrop Grumman

History
- Concluded: 27 October 2015 (contract awarded for development)
- Outcome: Northrop Grumman selected to produce its entry as B-21 Raider
- Related: 2037 bomber controversy
- Predecessors: Next-Generation Bomber

The Long Range Strike Bomber (LRS-B) is a development and acquisition program to develop a long-range strategic bomber for the United States Air Force, intended to be a heavy-payload stealth aircraft that can deliver thermonuclear weapons. Initial capability is planned for the mid-2020s. A request for proposal to develop the aircraft was issued in July 2014. The Air Force plans to procure at least 100 and potentially up to 200 of the LRS-B aircraft for an estimated $550 million each (2010 dollars). A development contract was awarded to Northrop Grumman for its B-21 Raider in October 2015. Much about the project is highly classified and little information is available to the public. It is known that construction of the aircraft had begun by July 2019, and on December 2, 2022, it was unveiled to the public.

== Origins ==
=== Conception ===
The LRS-B was the follow-on to the Next Generation Bomber (NGB) effort, whose spiraling costs due to numerous mission additions and requirements creep caused Secretary of Defense Robert Gates to cancel the program in 2009. On 19 May, Air Force Chief of Staff general Norton Schwartz said that the USAF's focus in the 2010 budget was on "Long-range strike, not next-generation bomber" and will push for this in the Quadrennial Defense Review. In June 2009, the two teams working on NGB proposals were told to "close up shop". However, long range strike was a critical requirement for the USAF and a new bomber was still determined as a required delivery method. In order to make a follow-on bomber program for long-range strike politically viable, Schwartz and Secretary of the Air Force Michael Donley worked to ensure that it would exercise discipline in requirements definition and make greater use of proven systems and technology as well as off-board enablers to rein in costs; according to Schwartz, they also relented to Gates' insistence on ending production of the F-22 fighter aircraft to further persuade him.

On 16 September 2009, Gates endorsed the concept of a new bomber but insisted that it must be affordable, stating: "What we must not do is repeat what happened with our last manned bomber. By the time the research, development, and requirements processes ran their course, the aircraft, despite its great capability, turned out to be so expensive – $2 billion each in the case of the B-2 Spirit—that less than one-sixth of the planned fleet of 132 was ever built." On 5 October 2009, Under Secretary of Defense for Acquisition Ashton Carter said that the DoD was still deciding if the USAF needed a new bomber and that, if approved, the aircraft would need to handle reconnaissance as well as strike missions. In July 2010, Carter said he intended to "make affordability a requirement" for the next-generation intelligence and strike platform. On 11 December 2009, Gates said that the Quadrennial Defense Review had shown the need for both manned and unmanned long range strike and that the 2011 budget would likely include funding for the future bomber. The USAF plans for the new bomber to be multi-role with intelligence, surveillance, and reconnaissance (ISR) capabilities. As a bomber, the LRS-B will be under Air Force Global Strike Command, while ISR assets are managed by Air Combat Command's 25th Air Force.

In 2010, Andrew Krepinevich, director of the Center for Strategic and Budgetary Assessments, questioned a reliance on short range aircraft like the F-35 to manage China in a future conflict and promoted reducing the F-35 buy in favor of a longer range platform like the Next-Generation Bomber; then-secretary of the Air Force Michael Wynne had rejected this plan in 2007. During debate on the New START treaty in December 2010, several senators raised the LRS-B as a reason to oppose or delay ratification.

=== Funding ===
On 6 January 2011, Gates made a speech on the U.S. defense budget for FY 2012, which announced major investment in developing a long-range, nuclear-capable bomber, also to be optionally remotely piloted. He also said the aircraft "will be designed and developed using proven technologies, an approach that should make it possible to deliver this capability on schedule and in quantity. It is important that we begin this project now to ensure that a new bomber can be ready before the current aging fleet goes out of service. The follow on bomber represents a key component of a joint portfolio of conventional deep-strike capabilities—an area that should be a high priority for future defense investment given the anti-access challenges our military faces." In July 2011, Joint Chief Vice Chairman James Cartwright called for a large UAV instead of a manned aircraft, including for the nuclear mission. Retired Air Force colonel and Center for Strategic and Budgetary Assessments analyst Mark Gunzinger has called for an optionally manned bomber, stating that purely unmanned bombers would be at a disadvantage without direct human pilot awareness and vulnerable to communication disruption.

In March 2011, the USAF decided to purchase 80 to 100 aircraft. Air Force Global Strike Command indicated that one requirement for the bomber is to carry a weapon of similar effect to the Massive Ordnance Penetrator. In addition to the strategic bombing, tactical bombing, and prompt global strike roles typical for a bomber, the aircraft is to be part of a family of systems responsible for ground surveillance and electronic attack. The Obama Administration in its 2012 budget request asked for $197 million and a total of $3.7 billion over five years to develop the bomber, including modular payloads for intelligence, surveillance, reconnaissance (ISR), electronic attack (EA), and communications. It shall be nuclear-capable, but shall not be certified as such until older bombers are set to retire.

In 2011, the House Armed Services Committee added language that would require two engine programs for the bomber; Carter objected that the addition would interfere with plans to reuse an existing engine. Reportedly, the two most likely engines are the Pratt & Whitney PW9000 engine, which uses a combination of Pratt & Whitney F135 and commercial turbofan technology, and a derivative of the General Electric/Rolls-Royce F136. In May 2011, Air Force Undersecretary Erin Conaton announced that a program office was being set up for the bomber. The USAF asked for $292 million for the program in its 2013 budget request. The program has also been referred to as "Long-Range Strike-B" (LRS-B). In 2012, former Pentagon weapons tester Thomas P. Christie speculated that the bomber program had been initiated so that the Air Force would have a sacrificial program to offer during anticipated defense budget shortfalls. The USAF seems committed to the program, given a lack of other non-nuclear options to deal with "deeply buried and/or hardened targets," and committed two percent of their investment budget to the project, compared to three percent to sustain existing bombers.

As of August 2013, the USAF believed that the LRS-B could reach Initial Operating Capability (IOC) in 2025. Reportedly, the main risk is funding, in light of the F-35 Lightning II's acquisition difficulties and a lack of an "urgent threat". Prior bomber programs were hindered by a lack of funding, only 21 B-2 Spirits were produced out of 132 planned and fewer B-1 Lancers were built than were envisioned; both programs were scaled down due to spiraling per aircraft costs. Research funding was allocated, as stealthy technologies to counter anti-access/area-denial threats were spared from budget cuts. The USAF stated the LRS-B is a top priority as it was believed that China will overcome the B-2's low-observable features by the 2020s. Where possible, existing technologies and proven subsystems will be used in order to keep it within budget, instead of developing new and riskier ones. Components such as engines and radars may be off-the-shelf or adaptions of existing models, such as derivative technologies of the F-35. The LRS-B is intended to perform any long range mission, rather than one specialized mission, which drove up the cost of the B-2. The USAF expects it to cost $1 billion each with development costs factored in, and aims for a per-aircraft cost of $550 million, considered reasonable for a limited production run military aircraft.

=== Production proposals, timeframe ===
On 25 October 2013, Boeing and Lockheed Martin announced their teaming up for the LRS-B. Boeing will be the prime contractor. The two companies previously joined for the program in 2008, but the partnership ended in 2010 when requirements shifted. Boeing believes that as the program had evolved, they can readdress their partnership to specifically address requirements. The team has Boeing's bomber experience and Lockheed Martin's stealth experience. At the time of the announcement, official details about the LRS-B were that it will likely be optionally manned and use stealth technology. On 30 January 2014, Northrop Grumman stated their intention to invest in developing needed technology for the bomber, such as stealth designs, mission management systems, and autonomous controls.

In January 2014, General Schwartz said that the Pentagon should abandon plans to outfit the F-35 with nuclear weapons in favor of the LRS-B. A 2010 Nuclear Posture Review stated that replacing the F-16 with the F-35 retains dual conventional and nuclear delivery capabilities for USAF fighters. The Congressional Budget Office (CBO) determined that upgrading the F-35 for nuclear deployment would cost $350 million over the next decade. Schwartz said that without financial support from NATO, where some nuclear-capable F-35s would be deployed, those funds should be transferred to the LRS-B. At the same time, Congress cut funding for the B61 nuclear bomb, stripping $10 million from F-35 integration and $34.8 million for life extension; Schwartz stated that B61's life extension must proceed.

On 20 February 2014, the USAF reasserted the bomber's need at the annual Air Force Association Air Warfare Symposium in Orlando, Fla. It was stated it will be fielded in the mid-2020s, and between 80 and 100 of the bombers will be procured. Lt. Gen. Burton Field clarified the 80 to 100 range is due to uncertainty over the price rather than a figure representing the minimum number of bombers needed to mitigate risk. Some USAF leaders expect the unit cost limit of $550 million per aircraft will be exceeded with additional equipment added to the airframe. The cost goal is to set design constraints to prevent extra requirements for capability growth desires and untested technologies that would increase the price more from being incorporated during development. Though the final cost may be greater than planned, a fixed price objective is expected to keep average procurement costs affordable. Rather than the price ceiling being too low to meet requirements, the USAF sees this arrangement as itself and the potential contractor being disciplined about the bomber's missions and roles. Research and development expenses are likely to be "significant", but not expected to be double the cost of production aircraft.

The USAF intended to release a full request for proposals (RFP), a final RFP, and begin the competition for the Long-Range Strike Bomber in fall 2014. Two teams, Northrop Grumman and Boeing–Lockheed Martin, were working on pre-proposals for the competition. In June 2014, the USAF revealed that the LRS-B RFP would be released "soon," with proposals to be submitted by fall 2014 and evaluations completed in early 2015, with a contract award after that. Some public information includes that it will be operational in the mid-2020s, based on existing technologies, have a large payload, may possibly be optionally-manned, and is being designed to work with a "family of systems" that includes ISR, electronic attack, and communication systems. Early aircraft will be designed around fixed requirements with mature technologies that will be adaptable through open architecture for future sensor and weapons capabilities. Although the LRS-B request for proposals (RFP) was to be released by the end of June, the USAF hesitated to publicly announce it to keep the process fair and less likely to give sensitive information to "potential adversaries". Public announcements of future acquisition milestones are to be "released as appropriate."

== Competitive phase ==
The USAF released its RFP for the LRS-B on 9 July 2014. By entering the competitive phase of acquisition, the USAF is limited with what it is able to release, and few details were expected to be made public until the contract is awarded in the second quarter of 2015. The LRS-B is expected to replace the B-52 fleet, possibly replace a portion of the B-1 fleet, and complement the B-2 fleet. According to an Air Force study, the Boeing B-52 Stratofortresses and Rockwell B-1 Lancers currently in inventory will reach the end of their service lives by 2045.

Northrop Grumman could base production in Florida if they won the contract, which would provide tax credits, while California passed a bill offering tax credits to the manufacturer if they build it in their state, which would mainly benefit the Boeing–Lockheed Martin team. On 14 August 2014, the California legislature passed a measure to apply tax benefits equally to prime and subcontractors. The previous measure only applied to subcontractors, meaning Lockheed Martin as part of the Boeing–Lockheed Martin team, placing Northrop Grumman at a near half-billion-dollar disadvantage in the bidding; the new measure levels the tax benefit field by also applying them to prime contractors, as Northrop Grumman has no subcontractor and also has operations in Palmdale.

With a target price of $550 million per aircraft, Defense News quoted a source with knowledge of the program predicting that the LRS-B may be smaller than the B-2, perhaps half the size, powered by two engines in the F135 power class. The target unit cost of $550 million is based on 2010 dollars and is $606 million in 2016 dollars. One of the program's main effects will be its impact on the industrial base; three of the country's five largest defense firms are competing. After the LRS-B, the USAF will not have another major attack aircraft program until the 2030s for a new fighter, with a follow-on bomber after that. With that stretch of time in between, the loser may be forced to leave the industry entirely; Northrop Grumman would likely not retain the infrastructure required for the next major undertaking, and Boeing's main aircraft field is now its commercial products. Industrial impact may cause any contract to be contested by Congress from representatives that receive campaign donations from a company whose award would create jobs for constituents. In addition to competing with other USAF priorities, budgets may put the LRS-B at odds with other services' priorities such as the Columbia-class submarine.

In April 2015, the Pentagon revealed that individual technologies for the LRS-B will be competed to enhance flexibility, increase competition, and drive down costs. This means even though one team will build the aircraft, other competitors will have the chance to compete for sustainment and upgrade features. Although a contract was planned to be awarded in early summer 2015, it was pushed back to September 2015 to ensure the optimal contractor was selected. Prolonging this part of the process is seen as a time and money-saver later in the acquisition to ensure the resulting bomber can be useful over a 50-year lifespan.

In September 2015, the USAF revealed that the LRS-B's development was much further along than had been publicly acknowledged, and more than usual before a contract award. Final requirements had been finalized since May 2013. Both competitors had mature proposals with prototyping activities and wind tunnel tests along with subsystems, although no demonstrator had been built. The designs are "very different" from each other with different teams on subsystems such as engines, electronic warfare suites, and communications systems; subcontractors will likely not be announced when the winner is picked. The bomber seems similar to the B-2, but more advanced using improved materials for superior low observability, similar to or smaller in size, and will operate alone or as part of a strike package with other airborne assets. Conducting of tests and risk reduction this early in the acquisition process is in part because the program has been handled by the Air Force Rapid Capabilities Office since 2011, which has more freedom in how it procures technologies. To reduce risk, the aircraft's production rate will probably remain steady and fairly modest over the course of the aircraft's production. In late September 2015, the contract award was again delayed.

== Contract award ==
On 27 October 2015, the Defense Department awarded the development contract to Northrop Grumman. The initial value of the contract is $21.4 billion, but the deal could eventually be worth up to $80 billion. The deciding factor in the selection of the Northrop design was cost. On 6 November 2015, Boeing and Lockheed Martin protested the decision to the Government Accountability Office (GAO). Development costs have been estimated to be from $10 to $23 billion. On 16 February 2016, the GAO denied the protest, and Northrop Grumman resumed work on the project. Boeing-Lockheed Martin decided not to continue their bid protest, opting not to file suit against the Air Force in the Court of Federal Claims over the selection of Northrop Grumman.

== Designation and production of B-21s ==
At the 2016 Air Warfare Symposium, the LRS-B aircraft was formally designated B-21. The head of the US Air Force Global Strike Command expects that 100 B-21 bombers is the minimum ordered and envisions some 175–200 bombers in service. A 2015 media report states that the bomber could also be used as an intelligence gatherer, battle manager, and interceptor aircraft.

In November 2017, the CBO estimated the total cost of the bomber to be $97 billion, $69 billion of which are attributed to development costs.

== See also ==
- 2037 bomber controversy
