= Denied area =

Military intelligence jargon

Denied area is an intelligence term of art describing an extremely hostile operational environment with heavy surveillance.

The United States Department of Defense defines a denied area as "an area under enemy or unfriendly control in which friendly forces cannot expect to operate successfully within existing operational constraints and force capabilities."

When a reference is made to a friendly force denying an area to the enemy, such as a reference to friendly forces employing area-denial weapons, the intent is to create an area in which the enemy cannot operate without extreme risk.

Land mines can be used as area-denial weapons, and some modern semi-autonomous or remotely controlled artillery units can serve this purpose as well. In theory, nuclear, biological, and chemical weapons can also serve this purpose, for varying lengths of time, though such weapons have not yet been used for this purpose in major wars, although such weapons have been used for other purposes.

Some effective tactics for creating a denied area do not require a significant continuing commitment of personnel or additional material. For example, once a minefield is in place, no upkeep is required unless a significant percentage of the mines have been detonated or destroyed—no residual force commitment is required. This is why a denied area may well exist behind enemy lines when, if it were secured by friendly forces on the ground, it might be considered a forward position. When hostilities end, these areas can be very dangerous and expensive to clean up, assuming that one of the combatants is willing to. (see UXO, bomb disposal, land mine, and the contamination concerns for unconventional weapons).

A dirty bomb is a potential option for an area denial weapon that might be more accessible to small paramilitary or terrorist groups.

== See also ==
- Area denial weapons
- Scorched earth
