= Quadrennial Defense Review =

Former United States master plan for military and counterterrorism contingency

The Quadrennial Defense Review (QDR) was a study by the United States Department of Defense that analyzes strategic objectives and potential military threats. The Quadrennial Defense Review Report was the main public document describing the United States' military doctrine. Section 941 of the National Defense Authorization Act for FY2017 replaced the QDR with the National Defense Strategy.

As was stipulated in the 1997 National Defense Authorization Act (NDAA), the QDR was to be conducted every four years. Five QDR's were published before its discontinuation, from 1997 to 2014. Starting from 2006, the QDR was mandated to coincide with the issuance of the next year's budget request.

The congressionally mandated Quadrennial Defense Review (QDR) directs DoD to undertake a wide-ranging review of strategy, programs, and resources. Specifically, the QDR is expected to delineate a national defense strategy consistent with the most recent National Security Strategy by defining force structure, modernization plans, and a budget plan allowing the military to successfully execute the full range of missions within that strategy. The report will include an evaluation by the Secretary of Defense and Chairman of the Joint Chiefs of Staff of the military's ability to successfully execute its missions at a low-to-moderate level of risk within the forecast budget plan. The results of the 2001 QDR could well shape U.S. strategy and force structure in coming years. This report will be updated as future events warrant.

The 1996 QDR was the first review requested by the Congress following the dissolution of the Soviet Union.

In 1993, the Bottom Up Review (BUR) acknowledged the significant changes in the global security environment by articulating a strategy where the Department of Defense sought to prevent conflict by promoting democracy and peaceful resolution of conflict while connecting the U.S. military to the militaries of other countries, especially those of the former Soviet Union. The BUR addressed the need for peacekeeping and peace enforcement operations, but used the two major theater war (MTW) scenario as the main force shaping construct.

On 6 February 1997, then defense secretary William Cohen appointed a National Defense Panel (NDP) to review the QDR. In 2009, the House passed HR2647, which included language to mandate a NDP that would be mostly appointed by the Congress to review the 2010 QDR.

The 7–8 November 2000 QDR intended for implementation in FY2001 was a peacetime QDR created under Defense Secretary Cohen issued before the September 11, 2001 attacks. Within a month it was substantially rewritten by the Bush Administration which was elected the day following its release. For the second release, the mandate had changed, but still represented the pre-9/11 strategic environment.

The 2006 QDR issued February 6, 2006 was a wartime QDR created under Defense Secretary Donald Rumsfeld. The United States had been at war for over four years.

On April 7, 2009, Defense Secretary Robert Gates said that the 2010 QDR would include a review of the nation's amphibious programs, including the fate of the Expeditionary Fighting Vehicle or EFV. Congress created a Quadrennial Defense Review Independent Panel to review the results of the 2010 QDR. Russian Foreign Minister Sergei Lavrov welcomed the changes to a more multilateral tone in the 2010 QDR, but said that Russia still had issues with the new document.

== See also ==
- Quadrennial Diplomacy and Development Review
- Tooth-to-tail ratio
