= Noshir Gowadia =

Former aerospace engineer and convicted spy

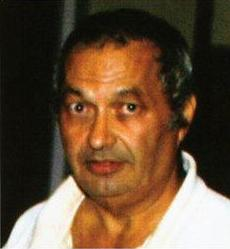
- Born: Noshir Sheriarji Gowadia; April 11, 1944 (age 82); Bombay, Bombay Presidency, British India (now Maharashtra, Republic of India)
- Occupation: Former Design Engineer
- Status: Incarcerated at MCFP Springfield
- Allegiance: China; Germany; Israel; Switzerland
- Conviction: Espionage
- Criminal charge: Violating the Arms Export Control Act
- Penalty: 32 years

Noshir Sheriarji Gowadia (born April 11, 1944) is a former design engineer and convicted spy for several countries. He was arrested in 2005 and later convicted on industrial espionage-related federal charges.

Gowadia was accused of selling classified information to China and to individuals in Germany, Israel, and Switzerland. On August 9, 2010, he was convicted in the United States District Court for the District of Hawaii on 14 of the 17 charges against him. On January 24, 2011, he was sentenced to 32 years in prison.

== Early career ==
Born to a Parsi family in Mumbai, India, he immigrated to the United States in 1963 and became a naturalized U.S. citizen. He joined Northrop in November 1968, and continued to work there until April 1986. As a design engineer, Gowadia was reportedly one of the principal designers of the B-2 Spirit stealth bomber, who conceived and conceptually designed the B-2 bomber's entire propulsion system.

== Arrest on espionage-related charges ==
In October 2005, he was interviewed twice by the authorities, and his home in Hawaii was searched. Later the same month, he was arrested, and charged with giving secret defense information to unauthorized parties. According to prosecutors, the information mostly related to the B-2 project, and at least eight foreign countries were shown documents relating to the B-2's stealth technology. In an affidavit, Gowadia admitted to transmitting classified information, and stated that he did so "to establish the technological credibility with the potential customers for future business." Gowadia was held without bail after his arrest.

On October 26, 2005, Gowadia was arrested and charged with one count of "willfully communicating delivering or transmitting national defense information to a person not entitled to receive it, which information the possessor has reason to believe could be used to the injury of the United States or to the advantage of a foreign nation" in the United States District Court for the District of Hawaii.

On November 8, 2006, a federal grand jury in Honolulu returned an 18-count superseding indictment against Gowadia. According to a press release from the Department of Justice:

The indictment charges Gowadia with "performing substantial defense related services for the People's Republic of China (PRC) by agreeing to design, and later designing, a low observable cruise missile exhaust system nozzle capable of rendering the missile less susceptible to detection and interception."

Count one of the superseding indictment charges Gowadia with conspiring to violate the Arms Export Control Act by entering into an illegal agreement to design and assist in the testing of the stealthy cruise missile nozzle. Count two charges Gowadia with the substantive act of performing a defense service for the PRC without first obtaining the necessary licensing approval of the U.S. Department of State. The superseding indictment describes six trips taken by Gowadia to the PRC for the purpose of discussing, designing and testing the stealthy cruise missile nozzle and describes contacts through covert email addresses between Gowadia and named co-conspirators, one of whom is alleged to be a representative of the PRC's "Foreign Experts Bureau." The superseding indictment also describes Gowadia's covert travel and entry into mainland China for the purpose of assisting the PRC in the development of the stealthy exhaust nozzle.

The superseding indictment also charges Gowadia with three counts of willfully communicating classified national defense information to PRC representatives with the intent that it be used to the advantage of the PRC or to the injury of the United States. The superseding indictment additionally charges Gowadia with two counts of willfully communicating classified national defense information which could be used to the advantage of the PRC, or the injury of the United States to persons in the PRC not entitled to receive it.

Gowadia was also charged with helping to design stealth technology for Chinese missiles, and with money laundering.

== Trial ==
Gowadia's trial was scheduled for July 10, 2007 but received a continuance until February 12, 2008, because Gowadia's new counsel had to be investigated by the United States Department of Justice for a security background check to allow him to use classified information as evidence at the trial. It was later reported that the trial had been postponed until October 2008, and then again postponed until January 21, 2009. A trial date for May 5, 2009 was delayed in order to assess if Gowadia was fit to stand trial on mental health grounds.

In November 2009, defense counsel psychology experts tried to establish that Gowadia has narcissistic personality disorder but U.S. Magistrate Judge Kevin S.C. Chang said in a ruling issued late Friday, November 20, that the testimony of the two defense witnesses — Richard Rogers, a forensic psychology professor at the University of North Texas, and Pablo Stewart, a psychiatry professor at the University of California, San Francisco — was not credible. The defendant's unwillingness to thoroughly consult with his lawyers does not equate with an inability to do so, Chang said. That challenging relationship between the defendant and his lawyers cannot and does not provide the basis to find the defendant incompetent, Chang added. Chief U.S. District Judge Susan Oki Mollway chose to accept Chang's recommendation.

A trial was held in 2010. Opening statements began on April 12, 2010. The trial included 39 days of often technical testimony and lasted nearly four months. The FBI Case Agent, Thatcher Mohajerin, testified for weeks. Closing arguments took place on July 29, 2010. Assistant U.S. Attorney Ken Sorenson represented the government in the case, and defense attorney David Klein represented Gowadia. The jury deliberated for five and a half days before returning a guilty verdict on August 10, 2010. Sorenson, the prosecutor, later won the J. Michael Bradford Award of the National Association of Former United States Attorneys for his work in the case.

Although sentencing was set for November 22, 2010, and though Gowadia could have faced a sentence of life in prison, on January 24, 2011, he was sentenced to 32 years in prison. On August 22, 2024, Gowadia's sentence was reduced to 27 years.

After sentencing, Gowadia was transferred to ADX Florence, before being transferred to MCFP Springfield in 2025. His release date is set at October 28, 2028.

== See also ==
- William Kampiles – a CIA clerk who sold a KH-11 spy satellite manual to the Soviet Union
- Robert Hanssen – an FBI agent who sold classified information to the Soviet Union and Russia
- Aldrich Ames – a CIA agent who sold classified information to the Soviet Union and Russia
- Thomas Patrick Cavanaugh – an aerospace engineer who tried to sell stealth bomber secrets to the Soviet Union
