= Tom Cavanagh (disambiguation) =

Tom Cavanagh (born 1963) is a Canadian actor.

Tom Cavanagh may also refer to:

- Tom Cavanagh (ice hockey) (1982–2011), hockey player
- Tommy Cavanagh (1928–2007), English footballer and coach
- Thomas Patrick Cavanagh (born 1945), American aerospace engineer who attempted to sell stealth bomber secrets to the Soviet Union

== See also ==
- Thomas Cavanaugh (1869–?), American sailor and Medal of Honor recipient
- Tomás Cavanagh (born 2001), Argentine footballer
- Tom Kavanagh (born 1970), Australian rules footballer
- Thomas Kavanagh (disambiguation)
