= Thomas Kavanagh =

Thomas Kavanagh may refer to:

- Thomas Kavanagh (politician) (1767–1837), Irish landowner and politician
- Thomas Kavanagh (academic) (born 1943), American literary scholar
- Thomas Christian Kavanagh (1912–1978), American civil engineer and educator
- Thomas G. Kavanagh (1917–1997), American jurist
- Thomas M. Kavanagh (1909–1975), American jurist
- Thomas Henry Kavanagh (1821–1882), Irish recipient of the Victoria Cross
- Tom Kavanagh (born 1970), Australian rules footballer
- Thomas Kavanagh (Irish criminal)

== See also ==
- Tom Cavanagh (disambiguation)
