= 2008 Andersen Air Force Base B-2 crash =

2008 stealth bomber accident in Guam

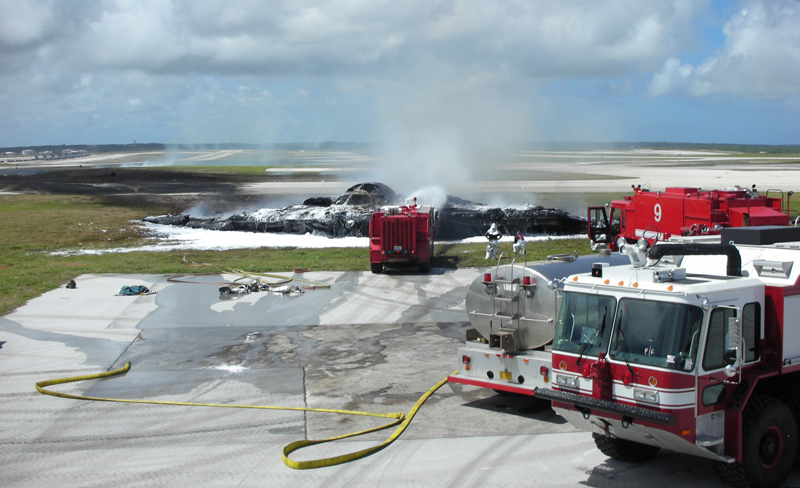
- Wreckage of the stealth bomber

Accident
- Date: 23 February 2008
- Summary: Stalled and crashed on take-off
- Site: Andersen Air Force Base, Guam; 13°35′13″N 144°56′19″E

Aircraft
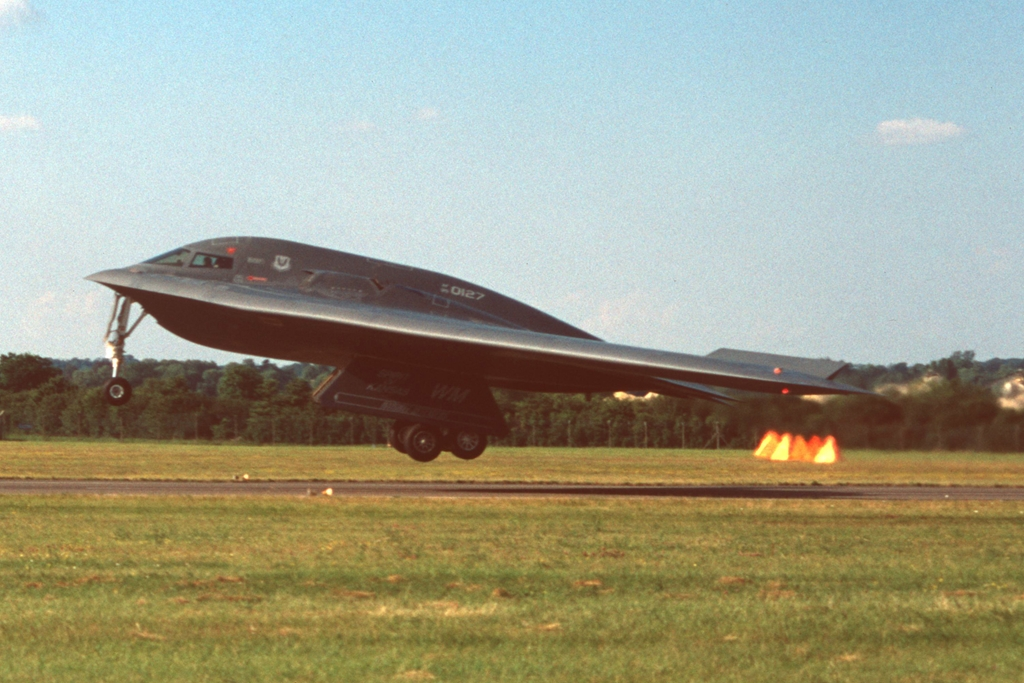
- 89-0127 Spirit of Kansas, the stealth bomber involved in the accident, seen in 1997
- Aircraft type: Northrop Grumman B-2 Spirit
- Aircraft name: Spirit of Kansas
- Operator: United States Air Force
- Registration: 89-0127
- Flight origin: Andersen Air Force Base, Guam
- Destination: Whiteman Air Force Base, Missouri
- Occupants: 2
- Crew: 2
- Fatalities: 0
- Injuries: 1
- Survivors: 2

On 23 February 2008, Spirit of Kansas, a B-2 Spirit stealth bomber of the United States Air Force, crashed on the runway moments after takeoff from Andersen Air Force Base in Guam. The aircraft was destroyed, but both crew members successfully ejected. The accident marked the first operational loss of a B‑2 bomber, and as of 2026 remains one of two lost B-2s since another damaged B-2 had to be retired due to uneconomical repair costs after a landing gear collapsed on takeoff resulting in an on-board fire in 2022. With an estimated loss of US$1.4 billion, considering only the cost of the aircraft, it was also the most expensive aircraft crash in history.

== Accident ==
On 23 February 2008, a B‑2 crashed on the runway shortly after takeoff from Andersen Air Force Base in Guam. The crash of the Spirit of Kansas, 89-0127, which had been operated by the 393rd Bomb Squadron, 509th Bomb Wing, Whiteman Air Force Base, Missouri, and had logged 5,100 flight hours, was the first crash of a B‑2.

The two-officer crew (Major Ryan Link and Captain Justin Grieve) were unable to control the bomber, and as one of its wingtips made contact with the ground, they ejected and survived the crash. The aircraft was destroyed, a total loss estimated at US$1.4 billion, equivalent to around $2.06 billion in 2025.

Video of the aircraft taking off then rolling to the ground.

According to the Air Force Times, a private-industry magazine, no munitions were on board. The Air Combat Command accident board report states that "classified material" had been loaded onto the bomber the morning the aircraft was returning to Whiteman Air Force Base "after a four-month deployment in support of Pacific Air Forces' continuous bomber presence."

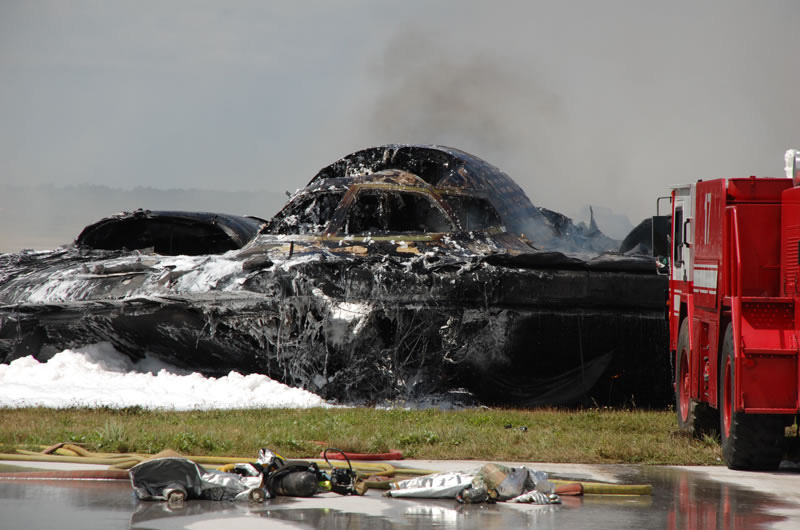
Close-up view of the forward fuselage after the fire was extinguished

At Guam Naval Hospital, one pilot was evaluated and released, and the second was hospitalized. A B‑2 already in the air was called back to Andersen after the crash, where it and the other B‑2s were grounded until the initial investigation into the crash was complete. Six Boeing B‑52s of the 96th Bomb Squadron, 2nd Bomb Wing at Barksdale Air Force Base, Louisiana, were deployed to replace the B‑2s.

The commander of the 509th Bomb Wing, Brig. Gen. Garrett Harencak temporarily suspended flying operations for all 20 remaining B‑2s to review procedures. Harencak termed the suspension a "safety pause" and stated that the B‑2s would resume flying if called upon for immediate operations. The B‑2 fleet returned to flight status on 15 April 2008.

== Investigation ==
The findings of the investigation stated that the B‑2 crashed after "heavy, lashing rains" caused moisture to enter skin-flush air-data sensors. The data from the sensors are used to calculate numerous factors including airspeed and altitude. Because three pressure transducers failed to function—attributable to condensation inside devices, not a maintenance error—the flight-control computers calculated inaccurate aircraft angle of attack and airspeed. Incorrect airspeed data on cockpit displays led to the aircraft rotating at 12 knots (22 km/h; 14 mph) slower than indicated. After the wheels lifted from the runway, which caused the flight control system to switch to different control laws, the erroneously-sensed negative angle of attack caused the computers to inject a sudden, 1.6 g (16 m/s^{2}), uncommanded 30-degree pitch-up maneuver. The combination of slow lift-off speed and the extreme angle of attack, with attendant drag, resulted in an unrecoverable stall, yaw, and descent. Both crew members successfully ejected from the aircraft soon after the left wing tip started to gouge the ground alongside the runway. The aircraft hit the ground, tumbled, and burned after its fuel ignited.

== In popular culture ==
The events of the Andersen Air Force Base B-2 crash were featured in the 2022 episode "Stealth Bomber Down", of the Canadian documentary TV series Mayday.
