= Thomas Kavanagh (academic) =

American scholar of French literature

Thomas M. Kavanagh
- Born: 1943 (age 82–83)

Academic background
- Education: College of the Holy Cross (BS); Yale University (MPhil, PhD)
- Thesis: The Vacant Mirror: A Study of Mimesis Through Diderot's Jacques Le Fataliste (1970)
- Doctoral advisor: Jacques Ehrmann

Academic work
- Discipline: French literature
- Sub-discipline: Eighteenth-century French literature, French culture, French cinema
- Institutions: Yale University
- Notable works: Enlightenment and the Shadows of Chance; Dice, Cards, Wheels; Enlightened Pleasures

Thomas Matthew Kavanagh (born 1943) is an American literary scholar of French literature. He is a professor emeritus of French at Yale University, where he was previously the Augustus R. Street Professor of French.

His 1993 book Enlightenment and the Shadows of Chance: The Novel and the Culture of Gambling in Eighteenth-Century France received the Modern Language Association's Scaglione Prize for French and Francophone Studies.

== Early life and education ==
Kavanagh was born in 1943, and was raised in Oak Park, Illinois. He graduated from the College of the Holy Cross with a Bachelor of Science in social science, magna cum laude, in 1965. He then earned his Master of Philosophy (M.Phil.) in 1968 and his Ph.D. in 1969 from Yale University. His doctoral dissertation, completed under French theorist Jacques Ehrmann, was titled, The Vacant Mirror: A Study of Mimesis Through Diderot's Jacques Le Fataliste.

== Academic career ==
After receiving his doctorate, Kavanagh was a professor at the State University of New York at Buffalo and the University of Colorado. In 1987, he was a professor of French at the University of Colorado Boulder specializing in eighteenth-century French literature. That same year, Kavanagh moved to the University of Michigan, where he became the chair of its Department of Romance Languages and Literatures. He remained chair until 1992.

In 1992, Kavanagh became a professor of French at the University of California, Berkeley. He left Berkeley to join the faculty of Yale University in 2002. At Yale, he became a professor of French specializing in eighteenth-century French literature and culture, aesthetics, narrative, and French cinema. He was the department's director of graduate studies in 2005. In the spring of 2005, Yale president Richard C. Levin appointed Kavanagh the Augustus R. Street Professor of French, an endowed professorship.

On July 1, 2009, Kavanagh became chair of Yale's Department of French. At the conclusion of his chairmanship in 2012, he was succeeded by Alice Kaplan.

Kavanagh announced his phased-retirement from teaching in the summer of 2013. He retired from the Yale faculty in 2016, and was named a professor emeritus at Yale that same year.

== Scholarship ==
Kavanagh's scholarship has concentrated on eighteenth-century French literature and culture while also addressing aesthetics, narrative, gambling and chance, visual art, and film. His research involves combining aesthetics, philosophy, and literature together in studies of figures including Denis Diderot, Jean-Jacques Rousseau, Voltaire, Giacomo Casanova, Françoise de Graffigny, Antoine Watteau, Nicolas Poussin, François Boucher, and Jean-Honoré Fragonard.

Kavanagh's first book, The Vacant Mirror: A Study of Mimesis through Diderot's Jacques le fataliste, was published by the Voltaire Foundation in 1973. The book examined mimesis and narrative through Denis Diderot's Jacques the Fatalist. His 1987 book Writing the Truth: Authority and Desire in Rousseau was published by the University of California Press.

In 1993, Johns Hopkins University Press published Kavanagh's Enlightenment and the Shadows of Chance: The Novel and the Culture of Gambling in Eighteenth-Century France. The book examined the relationship among gambling, ideas about chance, and the development of the eighteenth-century French novel. The book received the Modern Language Association's Scaglione Prize for French and Francophone Studies. Kavanagh next published Esthetics of the Moment: Literature and Art in the French Enlightenment with the University of Pennsylvania Press in 1996.

His 2005 book Dice, Cards, Wheels: A Different History of French Culture treated gambling as a means of studying French cultural history across approximately eight centuries. The book examined literary representations of gamblers from medieval dice games through modern casino culture and discussed authors including Jean Bodel, Blaise Pascal, Casanova, Honoré de Balzac, Jules Barbey d'Aurevilly, and Paul Bourget.

In 2010, Yale University Press published Enlightened Pleasures: Eighteenth-Century France and the New Epicureanism as part of its Lewis Walpole Series in Eighteenth-Century Culture and History.

== Awards and fellowships ==
Kavanagh received the Modern Language Association's Scaglione Prize for French and Francophone Studies for Enlightenment and the Shadows of Chance. He has held fellowships from the John Simon Guggenheim Memorial Foundation, the National Endowment for the Humanities, the Townsend Center for the Humanities at the University of California, Berkeley, and the University of Michigan's Center for Innovation in Teaching.

== Selected works ==
- Kavanagh, Thomas M. (1973). The Vacant Mirror: A Study of Mimesis through Diderot's Jacques le fataliste. Voltaire Foundation. ISBN 9780729401890.
- Kavanagh, Thomas M. (1987). Writing the Truth: Authority and Desire in Rousseau. Berkeley: University of California Press. ISBN 9780520056770.
- Kavanagh, Thomas M. (1993). Enlightenment and the Shadows of Chance: The Novel and the Culture of Gambling in Eighteenth-Century France. Baltimore: Johns Hopkins University Press. ISBN 9780801845499.
- Kavanagh, Thomas M. (1996). Esthetics of the Moment: Literature and Art in the French Enlightenment. Philadelphia: University of Pennsylvania Press. ISBN 9780812233797.
- Kavanagh, Thomas M. (2005). Dice, Cards, Wheels: A Different History of French Culture. Philadelphia: University of Pennsylvania Press. ISBN 9780812238600.
- Kavanagh, Thomas M. (2010). Enlightened Pleasures: Eighteenth-Century France and the New Epicureanism. New Haven: Yale University Press. ISBN 9780300140941.
