= AN/APQ-181 =

USAF B-2 Spirit aircraft multimode radar

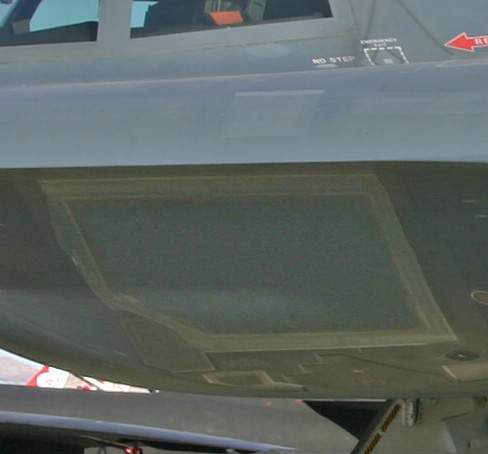
Light surface below wing edges is the AN/APQ-181 radar antenna

The AN/APQ-181 is an all-weather, low probability of intercept (LPI) phased array radar system designed by Hughes Aircraft (now Raytheon) for the U.S. Air Force B-2A Spirit bomber aircraft. The system was developed in the mid-1980s and entered service in 1993. The APQ-181 provides a number of precision targeting modes, and also supports terrain-following radar and terrain avoidance. The radar operates in the K_{u} band (a subset of the J band). The original design uses a TWT-based transmitter with a 2-dimensional passive electronically scanned array (PESA) antenna.

In 1991, the B-2 Industrial Team (including Hughes as a major subcontractor) was awarded the Collier Trophy in recognition of the "design, development, production, and flight testing of the B-2 aircraft, which has contributed significantly to America's enduring leadership in aerospace and the country's future national security."

In 2002, Raytheon was awarded a contract to develop a new, active electronically scanned array (AESA) version of the APQ-181. This upgrade will improve system reliability, and will also eliminate potential conflicts in frequency usage between the B-2 and commercial satellite systems that also use the J band.

In 2008 the Federal Communications Commission accidentally sold the APQ-181 frequency to a commercial user. This resulted in an additional cost to modify the in-progress AESA upgrade which had a total cost of around $1 billion, although the cost for the frequency change was only a portion of this. All B-2 aircraft are expected to have the upgraded radar by 2010.

In accordance with the Joint Electronics Type Designation System (JETDS), the "AN/APQ-181" designation represents the 181st design of an Army-Navy airborne electronic device for radar special equipment. The JETDS system also now is used to name all Department of Defense electronic systems.

== See also ==
- List of radars
- List of military electronics of the United States
- Joint Electronics Type Designation System (JETDS)
