= Jacques Ehrmann =

French writer

- Born: 31 March 1931; Mulhouse, France
- Died: 11 June 1972 (aged 41); New Haven, Connecticut, U.S.
- Citizenship: France
- Scientific career
- Fields: Literature, Literary theory, Structuralism, Deconstruction, Philosophy, Anthropology, Sociology, Architecture
- Workplaces: Yale University

Jacques Ehrmann (31 March 1931 – 11 June 1972) was a French literary theorist and a faculty member of the Yale University French Department from 1961 until his death in 1972.

== Biography ==
Jacques Ehrmann was born in Mulhouse (Haut-Rhin, France) on 31 March 1931, the son of Paul Ehrmann and Henriette Weber. Born in the Alsace region by a twist of fate, as both the Ehrmann and Weber families were originally from Alsace but had left after the 1871 loss to Germany, it just happened that Mulhouse, then Strasbourg, were the first assignments of his father, an Engineering graduate from "École Polytechnique".

The family, including his older brother Jean-Daniel (JD), came back to Paris in 1939 and he graduated from the Lycée Henri IV with a Baccalauréat in 1949, then studied at the Sorbonne where he obtained a Licence-des-Lettres in 1953. In the meantime, he received a Fulbright scholarship and spent an academic year from 1951 to 1952 at Carleton College in Northfield, Minnesota, the "City of Colleges, Cows and Contentment", a logo he loved to quote.

He was called to military service from 1953 to 1955 and served in the "Régiment de Tirailleurs Algériens", and later as a translator in Germany for the US headquarters. During this time he met Pierre Riboulet who would go on to create the French architectural firm l'Atelier de Montrouge with Gérard Thurnauer (1926) and Jean-Louis Véret (1927) with whom he became lifelong friends while furthering his deep interest in Architecture.

In 1956 he married Françoise Laborie and the couple moved to Los Angeles where he attended The University of California at Los Angeles (UCLA) and received a PhD in French Literature in 1961. There he met and befriended Raymond Federman with whom he perfected his tennis game. From 1959 to 1961 he taught at Pomona College in Claremont California while completing his doctoral dissertation.

Concurrently working as a freelance correspondent for France Presse he was offered a full-time assignment in New York City at the same time as he was invited to join the Yale University Faculty. Having to choose between journalism and academia, he chose Yale University in 1961. He lived in Hamden, Connecticut, with his wife and two sons.

As full professor he taught there in the French and Comparative Literature Departments and edited three issues of the "Yale French Studies" review which were later published as books. He was very involved in academic activities including lectures, conferences, and colloquia ... and continued to work through a long illness until his premature death on 11 June 1972.

He is survived by his son Guillaume, born February 24 1959, and six grandchildren. His son Laurent, born December 27 1961, died on February 16 2021, and his wife Françoise, born March 5 1932, died on February 28 2022.

== Complete bibliography ==
Books:

- Un paradis désespéré: l'amour et l'illusion dans "l'Astrée", PUF, 1962
- "Textes" suivi de La mort de la littérature, l'Herne, 1970

Editor of:

- La France contemporaine (in collaboration with Michel Beaujour) - US edition: MacMillan, 1965; French edition: A. Colin, 1965
- Structuralism - Yale French Studies, 36/37 and Anchor Books, 1970
- Literature and Revolution - Yale French Studies, 39 and Beacon Press, 1967
- Game, Play and Literature - Yale French Studies, 41 and Beacon Press, 1968

Articles:

- Camus and the Existentialist Venture - Yale French Studies, 25, 1960
- A Los Angeles le futur a déjà commencé - Le Monde, 13 August 1958
- Simone de Beauvoir and the related destinies of Woman and Intellectual - Yale French Studies, 27, 1961
- Jean Genet's theatre - Yale French Studies, 29, 1962
- Of Rats and Man: notes on Sartre's prefaces - Yale French Studies, 30, 1963
- The power of the French student - The Moderator, 1 (1962): 1.
- L'Ecole des Femmes ou, aux lumières de l'obscurantisme – Revue des Sciences Humaines, October 1962
- La temporalité dans l'oeuvre de Rabelais - The French Review, December 1963
- P. Rudolph architecte - L'Oeil, 122, February 1965
- Introduction to Gaston Bachelard - MLN, Fall 1966.
- Cinna et la politique de l'échange - Les Temps Modernes, November 1966 (translated in Yale French Studies, 36/37, 1966) (translated into Spanish and German)
- A semiotic approach to culture - Foreign Language Annals, December 1967 (in collaboration with Michel Beaujour)
- Le Neveu de Rameau. An existential psychoanalysis of Diderot by himself - Journal of Existential Psychiatry, Winter 1968
- On articulation. The languages of history and the terror of language – Yale French Studies, 39, 1967; French revised edition: Critique, June 1968
- L'homme en jeu. - Critique, 266, July 1969
- Jeu (article anthropologie) - Encyclopedia Universalis, Vol. IX.
- Live in Utopia. - Perspecta, Vol. 13/14; French abridged version: Habiter l'utopie? in l'Architecture d'aujourd'hui, July 1970
- L'Emprise des signes - Semiotica VI, 1972
- The minimum narrative - Sub-stance, Winter 1972
- Le dedans et le dehors - Poétique, 9, 1972
- Greffe - Exil, 1, Fall 1973

Book reviews:

- Book reviews in La Table Ronde, 1953.
- Michel Butor's Degrés - The French Review, October 1961
- James Doolittle's Rameau's Nephew - MLN, January 1962
- R. Girard's Mensonge romantique... - The French Review, October 1963
- R. Queneau's Bords - The French Review, April 1954
- S. de Beauvoir's La Force des choses - The French Review, May 1964
- K. Axelos' Vers la pensée planetaire - The French Review, February 1965
- Qui parle? - Mantala, 1
- Tendances et volontés de la société française - The French Review.

Lectures and papers:

- Sartre et Barthes - MLA 1959
- Le Neveu de Rameau - MLA 1060
- Hyles, Don Juan baroque - MLA 1961
- La critique de G. Bachelard - U. of Kentucky, Modern Language Conference 1965
- Cinéma, réalité, vérité - Yale U. French Department Lecture 1964
- Histoire, Tragédie, Utopie - Yale U. French Department Lecture 1966
- A Semiotic Approach to Culture - MLA December 1966
- Lecture tour in California: UCLA, San Diego, Irvine, February 1970
- Colloquium on Continuity and Discontinuity - SUNY Buffalo, March 1970
- Utopy / Signs / Tragedy - Wesleyan U. Center for the Humanities, November 1971
- Symposium on Literature and the City - Yale U. Institute for Social Sciences, November 1971

== Primary sources ==
- Ehrmann, Jacques. 1963. Un paradis désespéré — L'amour et l'illusion dans "L'astrée". Published by Yale University Press / Presses Universitaires de France (PUF).
- Ehrmann, Jacques. 1965. La France contemporaine — Choix de textes culturels. Edited with Michel Beaujour. Published by The MacMillan Co.
- Ehrmann, Jacques. 1966. Structuralism. Published by Yale University Press, Yale French Studies, double issue 36-37.
- Ehrmann, Jacques. 1967. Literature and Revolution. Published by Yale French Studies, issue 39.
- Ehrmann, Jacques. 1968. Game, Play, Literature. Published by Yale French Studies, issue 41.
- Ehrmann, Jacques. 1971. "Textes" suivie de La mort de la littérature. Published anonymously by Editions de L'Herne directed by Michel Beaujour.
- Ehrmann, Jacques. 1979. In Memory of Jacques Ehrmann — Inside Play Outside Game. Published by Yale French Studies, issue 58. Articles:
  - The Tragic/Utopian Meaning of History. (Trans: Jay Caplan)
  - Selections from "Textes II". (Trans: Michel Beaujour)
  - About Origin. (Trans: Michel Beaujour)
