= Thomas Patrick Cavanagh =

American attempted spy for the USSR in 1984

- Born: 1945 (age 80–81)
- Occupation: Aerospace engineer
- Status: Released
- Criminal charge: Espionage
- Penalty: Life imprisonment (reduced to 16 years)

Thomas Patrick Cavanagh is an aerospace engineer who was sentenced in 1985 after being convicted of trying to sell stealth bomber secrets to the Soviet Union.

== Biography ==
He was sentenced to life in prison.
