= Advanced Tactical Fighter =

U.S. Air Force stealth air superiority fighter program

Advanced Tactical Fighter (ATF)
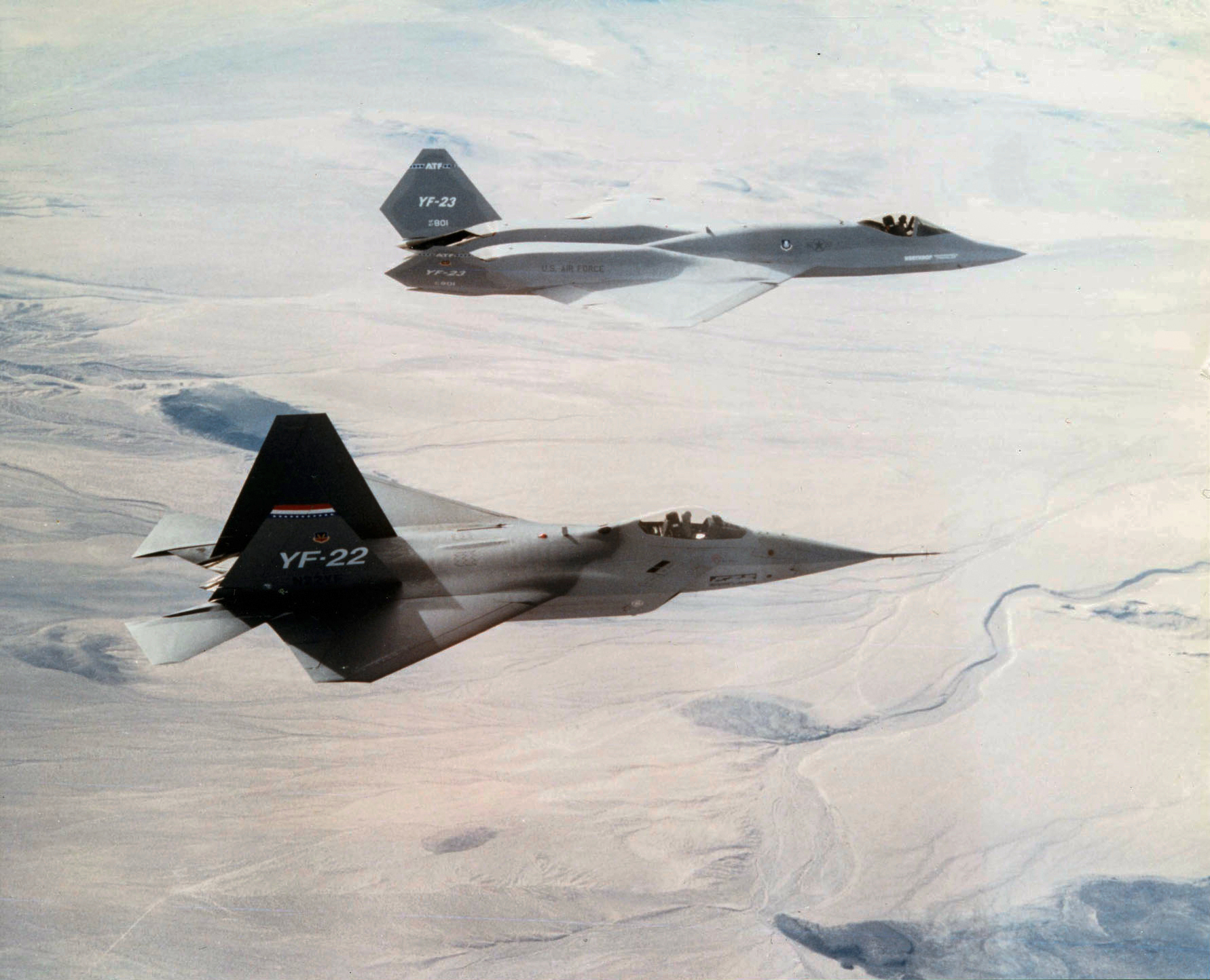
- The YF-22 (foreground) and YF-23 (background)

General information
- Project for: Air superiority fighter
- Issued by: United States Air Force
- Proposals: proposals from Boeing, General Dynamics, Grumman, Lockheed, Northrop, McDonnell Douglas, and North American Rockwell
- Prototypes: Lockheed YF-22, Northrop YF-23
- Requirement: Advanced Tactical Fighter Statement of Operational Need (November 1984), System Operational Requirements Document (December 1987)

History
- Initiated: May 1981 (RFI), September 1985 (RFP)
- Concluded: August 1991
- Outcome: Lockheed team selected for full-scale development of the F-22 for production and service
- Related: JAFE/ATFE, NATF, Have Dash II

The Advanced Tactical Fighter (ATF) was a program undertaken by the United States Air Force to develop a next-generation air superiority fighter to replace the F-15 Eagle. The proposed fighter was intended to counter emerging worldwide threats in the 1980s, including Soviet Sukhoi Su-27 and Mikoyan MiG-29 fighters under development, Beriev A-50 airborne warning and control systems (AWACS), and increasingly sophisticated surface-to-air missile systems. The program resulted in the F-22 Raptor.

The ATF would make a leap in performance and capability by taking advantage of emerging technologies, including advanced avionics and flight control systems, more powerful propulsion systems, and stealth technology. Lockheed and Northrop were selected in 1986 as finalists for the program's Demonstration and Validation (Dem/Val) phase. They would be the lead contractors to respectively develop the YF-22 and YF-23 technology demonstrator prototypes, the associated avionics prototypes, and the system specification; the prototype aircraft were flight tested in 1990.

After evaluations, the Lockheed team was selected in 1991 for ATF full-scale development, or Engineering and Manufacturing Development (EMD). The Lockheed team developed their design into the F-22 Raptor, which first flew in 1997, for production and operational service; a naval version of the ATF (called NATF) was considered as an F-14 Tomcat replacement but was later canceled due to costs.

== Background ==
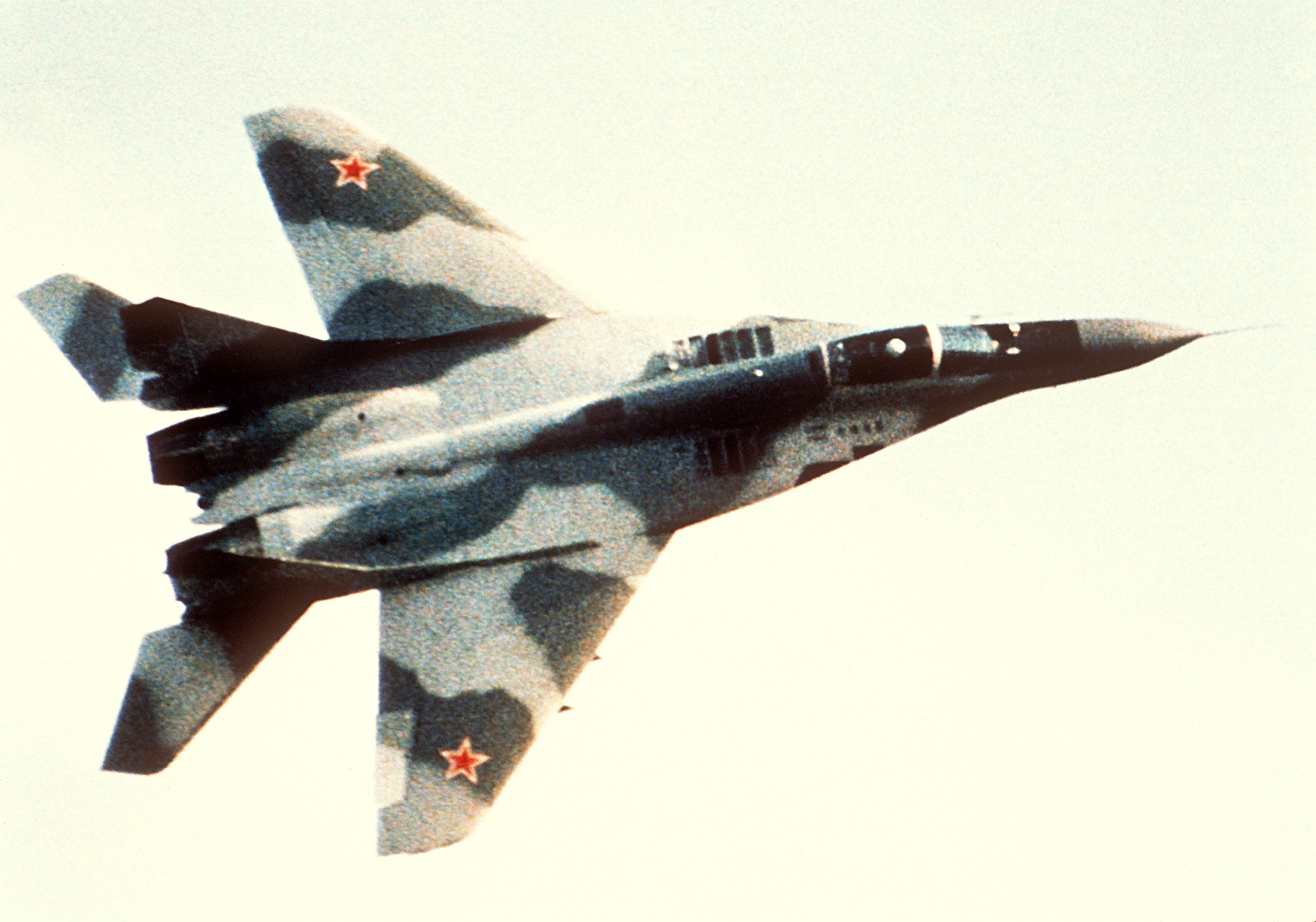
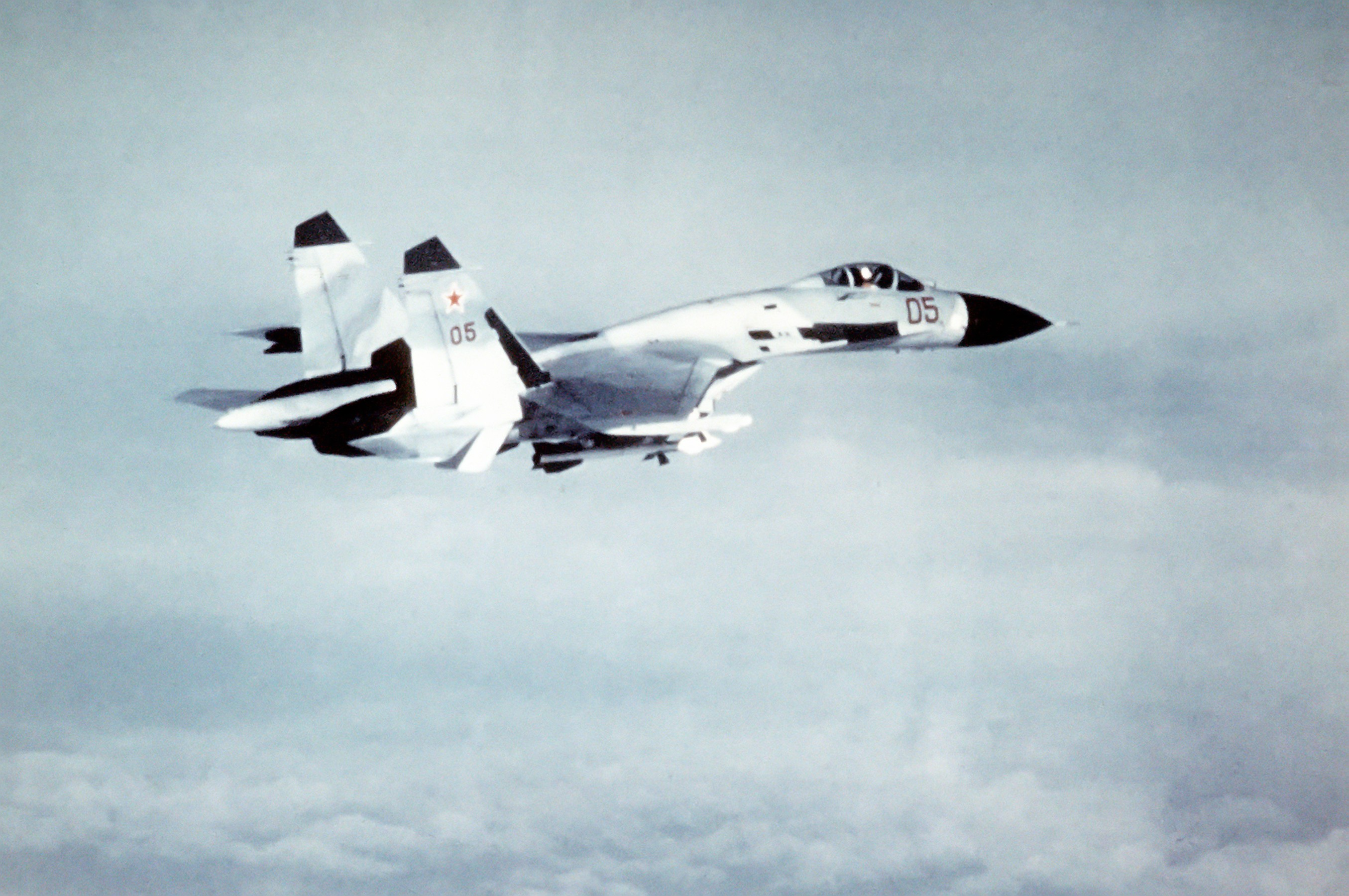
Emerging Soviet threats such as MiG-29 "Fulcrum" (left) and Su-27 "Flanker" (right) would spur the development of the Advanced Tactical Fighter

Although the term "Advanced Tactical Fighter" (ATF) appeared in U.S. Air Force (USAF) parlance as far back as 1971 to describe potential future tactical aircraft – initially an air-to-surface attack aircraft – the program that would eventually result in the F-22 began in 1981. (Note: While some of the initial studies focused on air-to-surface, they identified attributes needed to survive in high-threat environments, such as high cruise speed and stealth, that would be equally applicable to an air superiority fighter; some other precursor studies include the Advanced Tactical Attack System Mission Analysis (ATASMA) for air-to-surface and Advanced Counterair Engagement Mission Analysis (ACEMA) for air-to-air.) This was motivated by the shift in U.S. military doctrine in the late Cold War towards striking the enemy's rear echelons as eventually outlined in the AirLand Battle concept, as well as intelligence reports of multiple emerging worldwide threats emanating from the Soviet Union. Between 1977 and 1979, American satellite photographs of the "Ram-K" and "Ram-L" fighter prototypes at Ramenskoye air base in Zhukovsky—later identified as the Su-27 "Flanker" and the MiG-29 "Fulcrum" respectively—indicated that a new generation of Soviet fighter aircraft comparable to the recently introduced F-15 Eagle and F-16 Fighting Falcon would soon enter service.

Also concerning were Soviet reports of "look-down/shoot-down" capability being introduced on an advanced MiG-25 derivative, later revealed to be the MiG-31 "Foxhound", as well as the appearance of an Il-76-based airborne warning and control system (AWACS) aircraft called the A-50 "Mainstay". These systems, revealed in 1978, greatly reduced the effectiveness and survivability of low-altitude penetration. Furthermore, experience and data from the Vietnam War and the more recent 1973 Arab-Israeli war demonstrated the increasing lethality and sophistication of Soviet surface-to-air missile systems.

== Program history ==
=== Concept development ===
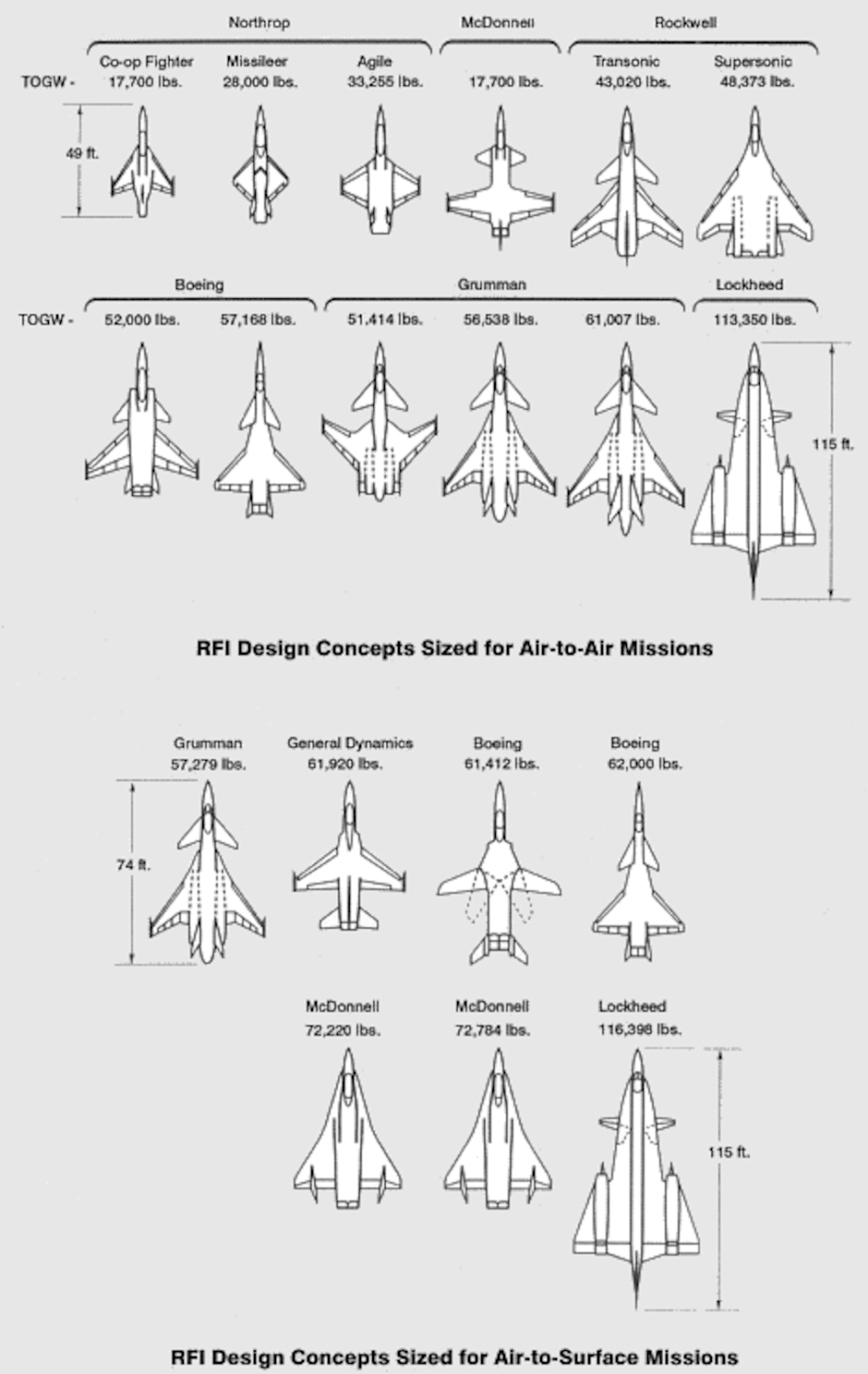
Diagram of several designs submitted for request for information (RFI)

In 1981, the USAF began forming requirements for the ATF, eventually codenamed "Senior Sky". In May, a request for information (RFI) to the aerospace industry was published by the USAF Aeronautical Systems Division (ASD), followed by another RFI for the ATF propulsion systems in June. In response, a number of aerospace defense contractors provided design concepts for analysis by the ASD, which released their final report in December 1982. During this time, the ASD also established an internal ATF Concept Development Team (CDT) in October 1982 to manage concept development studies. As the ATF was still early in its requirements definition, including whether the aircraft should be focused on air-to-air or air-to-surface, there was great variety in the RFI responses; the submitted designs generally fell into four concepts.

- Numbers Fighter (N): Lightweight, low-cost design trading lower individual capability for quantity.
- Supersonic Cruise and Maneuver (SCM): Approximately 55,000 lb (24,900 kg) takeoff weight fighter with high maneuverability and specific excess power at transonic and supersonic speeds.
- Subsonic Low Observable (SLO): An internal ASD concept that sacrificed fighter-like performance and speed for low radar cross-section and infrared signature. (Note: Despite the conceptual similarities, the SLO (based on a General Dynamics flying wing design) was separate from the "Senior Trend"/F-117 due to the latter's classification and special access restriction as a "black" program.)
- High-Mach/High-Altitude (HI): Large and fast missileer aircraft over 100,000 lb (45,400 kg) at takeoff intended to operate well above Mach 2 and 50,000 feet (15,200 m).

Further analysis by ASD would indicate that the best air-to-surface concept was SLO, while the best air-to-air concept was SCM; neither N nor HI were rated highly, and responses from contractors also broadly agreed on avoiding either extremes of the quality-versus-quantity spectrum. Even with the variety of the submitted designs in the responses, the common areas among some or all the concepts were reduced observability, or stealth (though not to the extent of the final requirements), short takeoff and landing (STOL) and sustained supersonic cruise without afterburners, or supercruise. It was envisioned that the ATF would incorporate emerging technologies to include advanced alloys and composite material, advanced avionics and fly-by-wire flight control systems, higher power propulsion systems, and low-observable, or stealth technology.

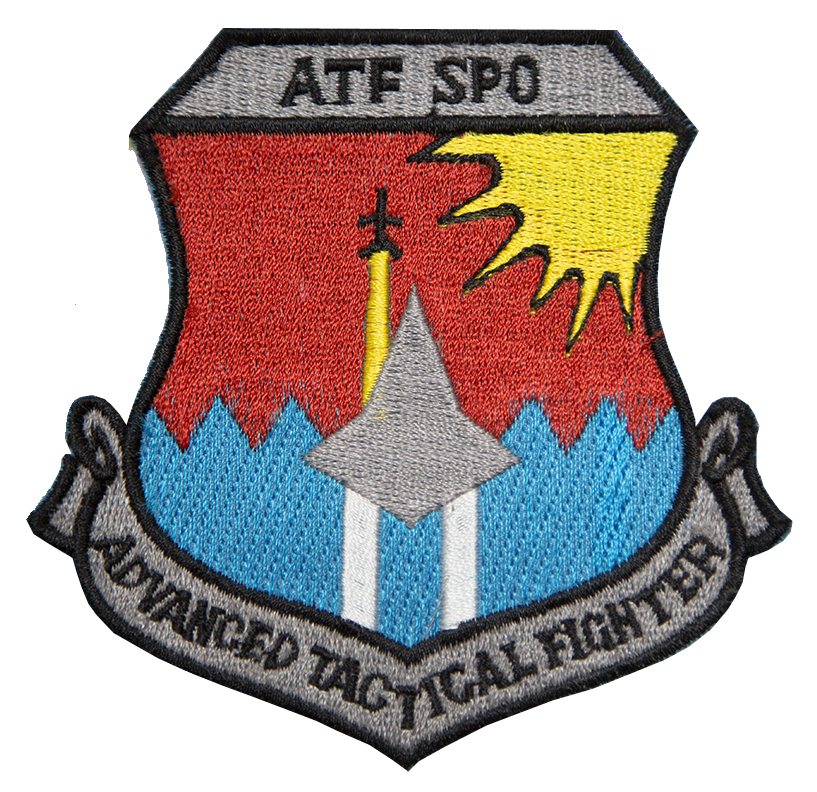
ATF SPO Patch, 1990

By October 1983, the ATF Concept Development Team had become the System Program Office (SPO) led by Colonel Albert C. Piccirillo at Wright-Patterson Air Force Base. After discussions with Tactical Air Command (TAC), the CDT/SPO determined that the ATF should focus on air-to-air missions. The air-to-surface missions would be handled by the upgraded F-111 variants, the upcoming Dual-Role Fighter (DRF), (formerly the Enhanced Tactical Fighter, which would result in the F-15E Strike Eagle) as well as the then-classified F-117 Nighthawk ("Senior Trend"), while the air-to-air threat from the new Soviet fighters and AWACS remained. (Note: Early on, the F-117 had been considered for hunting the Soviet AWACS, but this was deemed not effective in 1982.) Additionally, a multirole aircraft designed to effectively perform both air-to-air and air-to-surface missions was considered too costly; as with ASD and industry responses, TAC did not want the ATF to be at either extremes of the quality-versus-quantity spectrum. The ATF would thus be a new air superiority fighter in the vein of the SCM concept with outstanding aerodynamic performance, and intended to replace the capability of the F-15 Eagle by the 1990s. In the potential scenario of a Soviet and Warsaw Pact invasion in Central Europe, the ATF was envisaged to launch from bases in central England and support the air-land battle by performing offensive and defensive counter-air missions against the Soviet air-to-air threats. This would then allow the DRF and other strike aircraft to perform air interdiction against ground targets.

With the ATF's mission now focused on air-to-air, another round of requests were sent to the industry for concept exploration and study contracts were awarded to seven airframe manufacturers for further definition of their designs. A request for proposals (RFP) for the fighter's engine, initially called the Joint Advanced Fighter Engine (JAFE) due to its potential joint application with the U.S. Navy's short-lived Advanced Carrier-Based Multirole Fighter (VFMX), was released in May 1983 to Allison, General Electric, and Pratt & Whitney. In September 1983, General Electric and Pratt & Whitney each received $202 million contracts (~$533 million in 2024) for the development and production of prototype engines; Allison chose to not submit a bid due to technical problems with their advanced development demonstrators. The SPO also expected that avionics would be a major component of the ATF in light of rapidly advancing semiconductor technology; requests for advanced avionics components such as the integrated electronic warfare system were sent out that November.

During this time, the SPO took an increasing interest in stealth as results from classified special access or "black world" programs such as the Have Blue/F-117, Tacit Blue, and the Advanced Technology Bomber (ATB) program (which would result in the B-2 Spirit, or "Senior Ice") promised greatly reduced radar cross sections (RCS) that were orders of magnitude smaller than existing aircraft. (Note: The radar range equation meant that all else being equal, detection range is proportional to the fourth root of RCS; thus, reducing detection range by a factor of 10 requires a reduction of RCS by a factor of 10,000.) The ATF requirements would place increasing emphasis on stealth to improve survivability over the course of concept exploration, while still demanding fighter-like speed and maneuverability; the combination of low observables with the SCM concept was expected to greatly reduce the lethal zone of hostile surface-to-air missiles. As a result of stealth technology, the design details became "black" even though the ATF was a publicly acknowledged program. By late 1984, the SPO had settled on the ATF requirements and released the Statement of Operational Need (SON). The SON called for a fighter with a takeoff gross weight of 50,000 pounds (23,000 kg), a mission radius of 500 nautical miles (580 mi; 930 km) mixed subsonic/supersonic or 700–800 nautical miles (806–921 mi; 1,300–1,480 km) subsonic, supercruise speed of Mach 1.4–1.5, the ability to use a 2,000-foot (600 m) runway, and signature reduction, particularly in the frontal sector.

=== Request for proposals ===
The request for proposals (RFP) for demonstration and validation (Dem/Val) was issued in September 1985, with proposals initially to be due that December. The top four proposals, later reduced to two to reduce program costs, would proceed with Dem/Val. The RFP not only had the ATF's demanding technical requirements, but also placed great importance on systems engineering, technology development plans, and risk mitigation; in fact, these areas were deemed more important than the aircraft design proposals themselves as contractors would later discover in their debriefs after Dem/Val selection. This was because the SPO anticipated that the ATF would need to employ emerging technologies beyond even the contemporary state-of-the-art and did not want an aircraft design frozen at then-current mature technology readiness levels; as such, the SPO needed to evaluate its confidence in a contractor's ability to effectively and affordably develop new technology. Initially, there was no requirement for flying prototype air vehicles.

At this time, the SPO had anticipated procuring 750 ATFs at a unit flyaway cost of $35 million in fiscal year (FY) 1985 dollars (~$86.4 million in 2024) with final design selection in 1989 and service entry in 1995 with a peak production rate of 72 aircraft per year; this was essentially a 1-for-1 replacement for the service's air superiority F-15A/B/C/D fleet. Total program cost was expected to be $44.3 billion in FY 1985 dollars (~$109 billion in 2024), with $26.3 billion (~$64.9 billion in 2024) in procurement at flyaway cost. However, even at this point, the peak rate was being questioned and the entry date was at risk of slipping further to the mid/late 1990s due to potential RFP adjustments and budget constraints.

Shortly afterwards, the Navy under Congressional pressure joined the ATF program initially as an observer to examine the possibility of using a navalized derivative of the ATF by adapting the design for carrier operations; named the Navy Advanced Tactical Fighter (NATF), it was to replace the F-14 Tomcat. The Navy would eventually announced in 1988 that they plan to procure 546 aircraft under the NATF program at a peak rate of 48 per year.

The Dem/Val RFP would indeed see some changes after its first release that pushed the due date to July 1986; in December 1985, following discussions with Lockheed and Northrop, the two contractor teams with prior stealth experience from the Have Blue/F-117 and ATB/B-2 respectively, all-aspect stealth requirements were drastically increased. Furthermore, the Packard Commission, a federal commission by President Ronald Reagan to study Department of Defense procurement practices, had released its report in February 1986 and one of its recommendations was a "fly-before-buy" competitive procurement strategy that encouraged prototyping. The ATF SPO was pressured to follow the recommendations of the Packard Commission, and in May 1986, the RFP was changed so that final selections would involve flying prototypes. Because of this late addition due to political pressure, the prototype air vehicles were to be "best-effort" machines not meant to perform a competitive flyoff or represent a production aircraft that meets every requirement, but to demonstrate the viability of its concept and mitigate risk. The increased costs associated with aircraft prototyping was also partly why the number of Dem/Val finalists was reduced from four to two. (Note: The JAFE program, later renamed the ATF Engine (ATFE) program, were modified around this time as well to provide flightworthy examples for the prototypes, and the SPO would assume management of the ATF engine effort in February 1987.)

Lockheed's submission for Dem/Val RFP. The eventual YF-22 would have a completely different configuration.

In July 1986, proposals were provided by Boeing, General Dynamics, Grumman, Lockheed, Northrop, McDonnell Douglas, and North American Rockwell; Grumman and North American Rockwell would drop out shortly afterwards. Because contractors were expected to make immense investments of their own — likely approaching the amount awarded by the contracts themselves when combined — in order to develop the necessary technology to meet the ambitious requirements, teaming was encouraged by the SPO. Following proposal submissions, Lockheed (through its Skunk Works division), Boeing, and General Dynamics formed a team to develop whichever of their proposed designs was selected, if any. Northrop and McDonnell Douglas formed a team with a similar agreement.

Northrop's submission for Dem/Val RFP. In contrast to Lockheed, note the great similarity to the eventual YF-23.

On 31 October 1986, Lockheed and Northrop, the two industry leaders in stealth aircraft, were selected as first and second place respectively and would proceed as the finalists. Noteworthy is the divergent approach of the two finalists' proposals. Northrop's proposal leveraged its considerable experience with stealth to produce a refined and well-understood aircraft design that was very similar to the eventual flying prototype. While Lockheed also had extensive prior stealth experience, their actual aircraft design was quite immature and only existed as a rough concept that would have to be extensively redesigned; instead, Lockheed primarily focused on systems engineering and trade studies in its proposal, which pulled it ahead of Northrop's to take top ranking. The two teams, Lockheed-Boeing-General Dynamics and Northrop-McDonnell Douglas, were awarded $691 million firm fixed-price contracts in FY 1985 dollars (~$1.71 billion in 2024) and would undertake a 50-month Dem/Val phase, culminating in the flight test of two technology demonstrator prototypes, designated YF-22 for Lockheed and YF-23 for Northrop. (Note: The designation assignment of F-22 for Lockheed and F-23 for Northrop was allegedly determined by a coin toss at the SPO.) Pratt & Whitney and General Electric would also receive $341 million (~$842 million in 2024) each for the development and prototyping of the competing engines (designated YF119 and YF120 respectively), and the JAFE propulsion effort would later be renamed ATF Engine (ATFE) and directly managed by the ATF SPO.

=== Demonstration and validation ===
The Dem/Val phase was intended to develop and mature ATF technologies that would facilitate the fighter's eventual full-scale development and production, and focused on three main activities: requirements and system specification development, avionics ground prototypes and flying laboratories, and prototype air vehicles. During Dem/Val, the ATF SPO program manager was Colonel James A. Fain, while the technical director (or chief engineer) was Eric "Rick" Abell. The director of ATF requirements was Colonel David J. McCloud of TAC, and the draft System Operational Requirements Document (SORD), derived from the 1984 SON, was released in December 1987. In addition to the government contract awards, company investments during Dem/Val would amount to $675 million and $650 million (~$1.54 billion and ~$1.48 billion in 2024) for the Lockheed and Northrop teams respectively, not counting additional investments during prior phases or by subcontractors. Pratt & Whitney and General Electric would each invest $100 million as well (~$228 million in 2024).

With the ATF system specification, the SPO had set the technical requirements without specifying the "how"; this was meant to give the contractor teams flexibility in developing the requisite technologies and offer competing methods. Furthermore, the SPO was also open to adjusting requirements if necessary. Both the Lockheed and Northrop teams conducted performance and cost trade studies and presented them in system requirement reviews (SRRs) with the SPO periodically during Dem/Val. This enabled the SPO to adjust ATF requirements and delete those that were significant weight and cost drivers while having marginal operational value. For instance, the number of internal missiles (represented by the AIM-120A) was reduced from eight to six to reduce weight and cost. (Note: A clipped-fin variant of the AMRAAM, the AIM-120C, was eventually developed to increase the F-22's internal missile load back to eight.) Because of the added weight for thrust vectoring/reversing nozzles and related systems on the F-15 STOL/MTD research aircraft, the SPO changed the runway length requirement to 3,000 feet (900 m) and removed the thrust reverser requirement in late 1987. The ejection seat requirement was downgraded from a fresh design to the existing McDonnell Douglas ACES II. However, both contractor teams still found the 50,000 lb (22,700 kg) takeoff gross weight goal unachievable, so this was increased to 60,000 lb (27,200 kg), resulting in engine thrust requirement increasing from 30,000 lbf (133 kN) class to 35,000 lbf (156 kN) class. Furthermore, Dem/Val would be extended several times to better mature technologies and reduce near-term budget, and projected ATF service entry continued to risk slipping to the late 1990s.

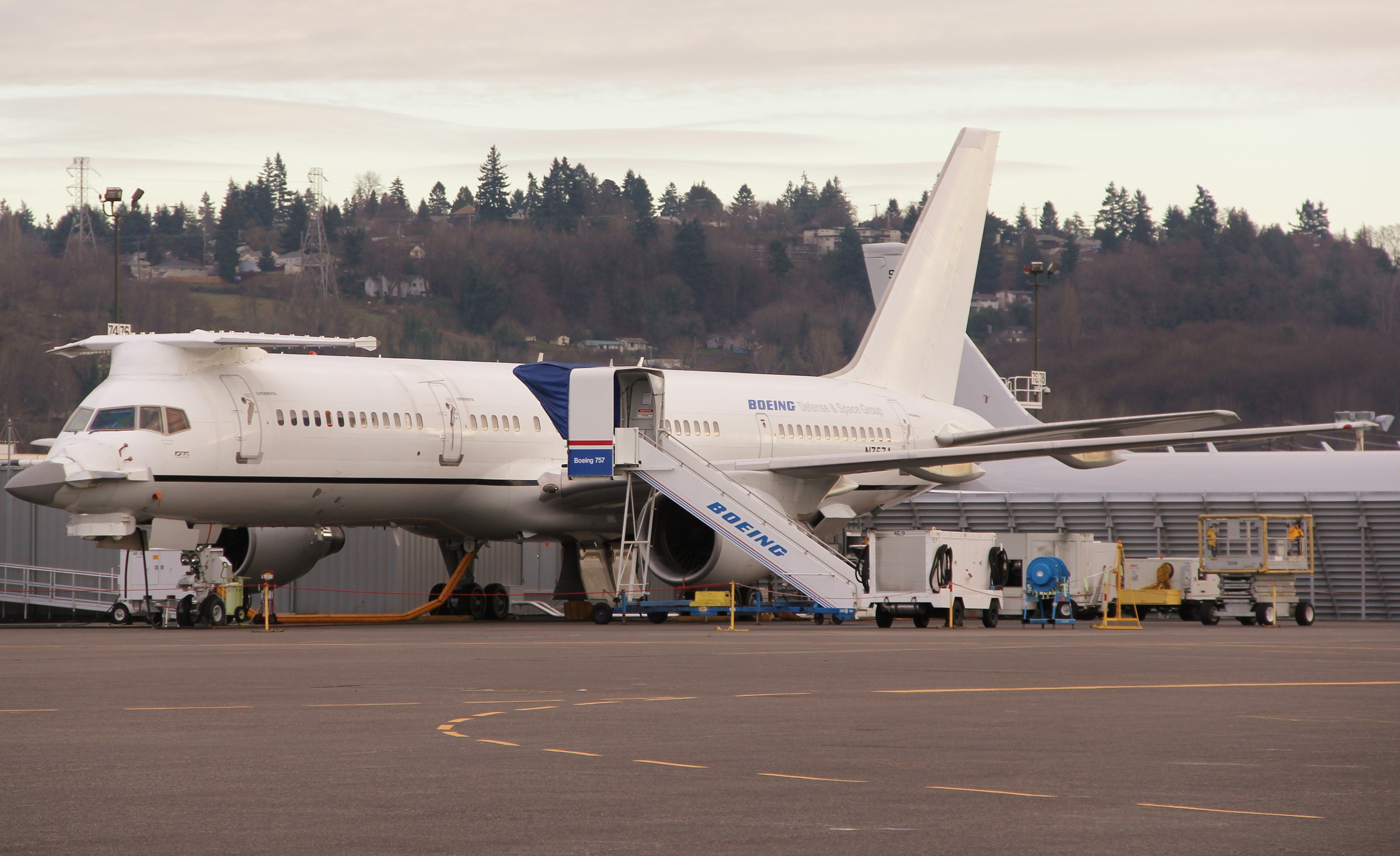
The Boeing 757 used for testing the Lockheed team's avionics and later modified into the Flying Test Bed during full-scale development.

Aside from advances in air vehicle and propulsion technology, the ATF would make a leap in terms of avionics performance with a fully integrated avionics suite that fuses sensor information together into a common tactical picture, thus improving the pilot's situational awareness and reducing workload; the avionics were expected to make up about 40% of the ATF's flyaway cost. The avionics system was to employ the PAVE PILLAR system architecture and leverage technology from the Very High Speed Integrated Circuit program; software would primarily be written in Ada. (Note: The ATF/PAVE PILLAR architecture was the basis for the Joint Integrated Avionics Working Group (JIAWG) formed in 1986, which was to develop a common avionics architecture for the ATF, Advanced Light Helicopter (LHX), and Advanced Tactical Aircraft (ATA) programs; the latter two programs, resulting in the RAH-66 Comanche and the A-12 Avenger II respectively, would eventually be canceled.) The Dem/Val phase for avionics development was marked by demonstrations of the hardware and software with Avionics Ground Prototypes (AGP) to evaluate performance and reliability. The SPO gave the teams flexibility to pick their own vendors for some subsystems; for instance, the Lockheed team's infrared search and track (IRST) sensor was supplied by General Electric, while Northrop team's was from Martin Marietta; both teams chose the Westinghouse/Texas Instruments active electronically scanned array (AESA) radar. (Note: The Westinghouse/Texas Instruments radar design would beat the Hughes/General Electric design and became the AN/APG-77.) The integrated electronics warfare and integrated communication, navigation, and identification avionics were selected by the SPO. Although not required, both teams would employ flying avionics laboratories as well, with the Lockheed team using a modified Boeing 757 and the Northrop team using a modified BAC One-Eleven. The avionics requirements were also the subject of SRRs and adjustments; as avionics was a significant cost driver, side-looking radars were deleted, and the dedicated IRST system was downgraded from multicolor to single color before changing from requirement to goal and provision for future addition. In 1989, a $9 million per aircraft cost cap on avionics in FY 1985 dollars (~$22.2 million in 2024) was imposed by the SPO to contain requirements creep.

Finally, two examples of each prototype air vehicles were built and flown for Dem/Val: one with General Electric YF120 engines, the other with Pratt & Whitney YF119 engines. Contractor teams made extensive use of analytical and empirical methods for their air vehicle designs, including wind tunnel testing, RCS pole testing, and software for computational fluid dynamics, RCS calculations, and computer-aided design. (Note: For example, the Lockheed team conducted 18,000 hours of wind tunnel testing during Dem/Val.) Consistent with the SPO's willingness to give contractor teams the flexibility in determining how to achieve the ATF requirements, the flight test plans were created and executed by the teams themselves and the prototype air vehicles were not flown against each other for direct comparisons; neither the YF-22 nor YF-23 would share the same test points, which were set by their own teams to demonstrate concept viability and validate engineering predictions. (Note: The contractor teams were to give the SPO "sealed envelope" flight performance predictions against which their aircraft would be evaluated, rather than against each other.) Noteworthy is the Lockheed team's complete redesign of their aircraft's entire shape and configuration in summer 1987 due to weight concerns, with prototype design freeze relatively soon afterwards resulting in the YF-22's shape being rather unrefined and immature. In contrast, the YF-23 was a continual refinement of Northrop's design concept even prior to Dem/Val proposal submission, with the configuration remaining largely the same throughout. Accurate artwork of the prototypes, which had been highly classified due to the stealth shaping, was first officially released in 1990 ahead of their public unveiling; the aforementioned Dem/Val extensions also pushed flight testing from 1989 to 1990. While the prototype air vehicle designs were frozen in 1988 in order to build the aircraft and begin flight tests by 1990, both teams continued to refine their F-22 and F-23 designs, or Preferred System Concepts, for full-scale development.

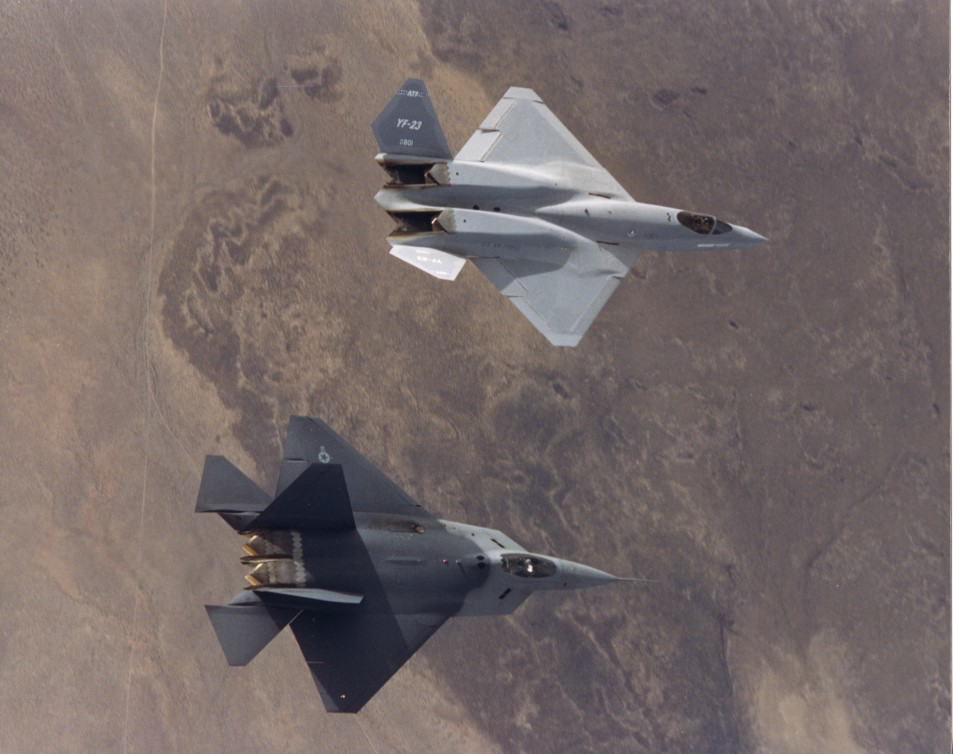
Northrop team's YF-23 (above) and Lockheed team's YF-22 (below) flying in formation

The first YF-23 made its maiden flight on 27 August 1990 and the first YF-22 first flew on 29 September 1990. Flight testing began afterwards at Edwards Air Force Base and added the second aircraft for each competitor in late October 1990. The first YF-23 with P&W engines supercruised at Mach 1.43 on 18 September 1990 and the second YF-23 with GE engines officially reached over Mach 1.6 on 29 November 1990, topping out at Mach 1.72. (Note: The YF-23 with the General Electric engines was officially stated to have been able to supercruise at over Mach 1.6, and estimates from General Electric engineers suggest that the top supercruise speed was as high as Mach 1.8.) The first YF-22 with GE engines achieved Mach 1.58 in supercruise on 3 November 1990 and the second YF-22 with P&W engines also achieved Mach 1.43 on 27 December 1990. Maximum speed of both prototype designs in afterburner was in excess of Mach 2. (Note: The YF119 did not yet incorporate the design changes for increased thrust and were still 30,000-lbf thrust engines, while the YF120 did and were 35,000-lbf thrust engines; as a result, both ATF prototypes achieved better performance with the GE engines.) Flight testing continued until December 1990 with the YF-22s accumulating 91.6 flight hours in 74 sorties while the YF-23s flew 65.2 hours in 50 sorties. Following flight testing, the contractor teams submitted their ATF full-scale development proposals on 31 December 1990. The teams' NATF designs, often referred to as "NATF-22" and "NATF-23" (they were never formally designated), were included in their proposals as well.

== Selection and full-scale development ==
Following a review of the flight test results and proposals, the Secretary of the Air Force, Donald Rice, announced the Lockheed team and Pratt & Whitney as the competition winner for full-scale development, or Engineering and Manufacturing Development (EMD), on 23 April 1991. Both air vehicle designs met or exceeded all performance requirements; the YF-23 was considered stealthier and faster, but the YF-22 was more agile. Furthermore, the U.S. Navy had begun considering a version of the ATF called Navy Advanced Tactical Fighter (NATF) in 1986, and it has been speculated in the aviation press that the YF-22 was also seen as more adaptable to the NATF. (Note: Both NATF-22 and NATF-23 would have been significantly different from their Air Force counterparts, with the NATF-22 having variable-sweep wings and the NATF-23 being shortened while having canards and a more conventional vertical tail arrangement.) However, by late 1990 to early 1991, the Navy was beginning to back out of NATF due to escalating costs, and abandoned NATF completely by FY 1992. By this time, with the Soviet threat diminishing, the 1990 Major Aircraft Review by Defense Secretary Dick Cheney had reduced the planned total ATF buy to 650 aircraft and peak production rate to 48 per year; the projected service entry date for initial operational capability (IOC) also further slipped into the early 2000s. (Note: The NATF peak production rate following the 1990 Major Aircraft Review was reduced to 36 per year, which further increased unit procurement costs and dissuaded the Navy from the program.)

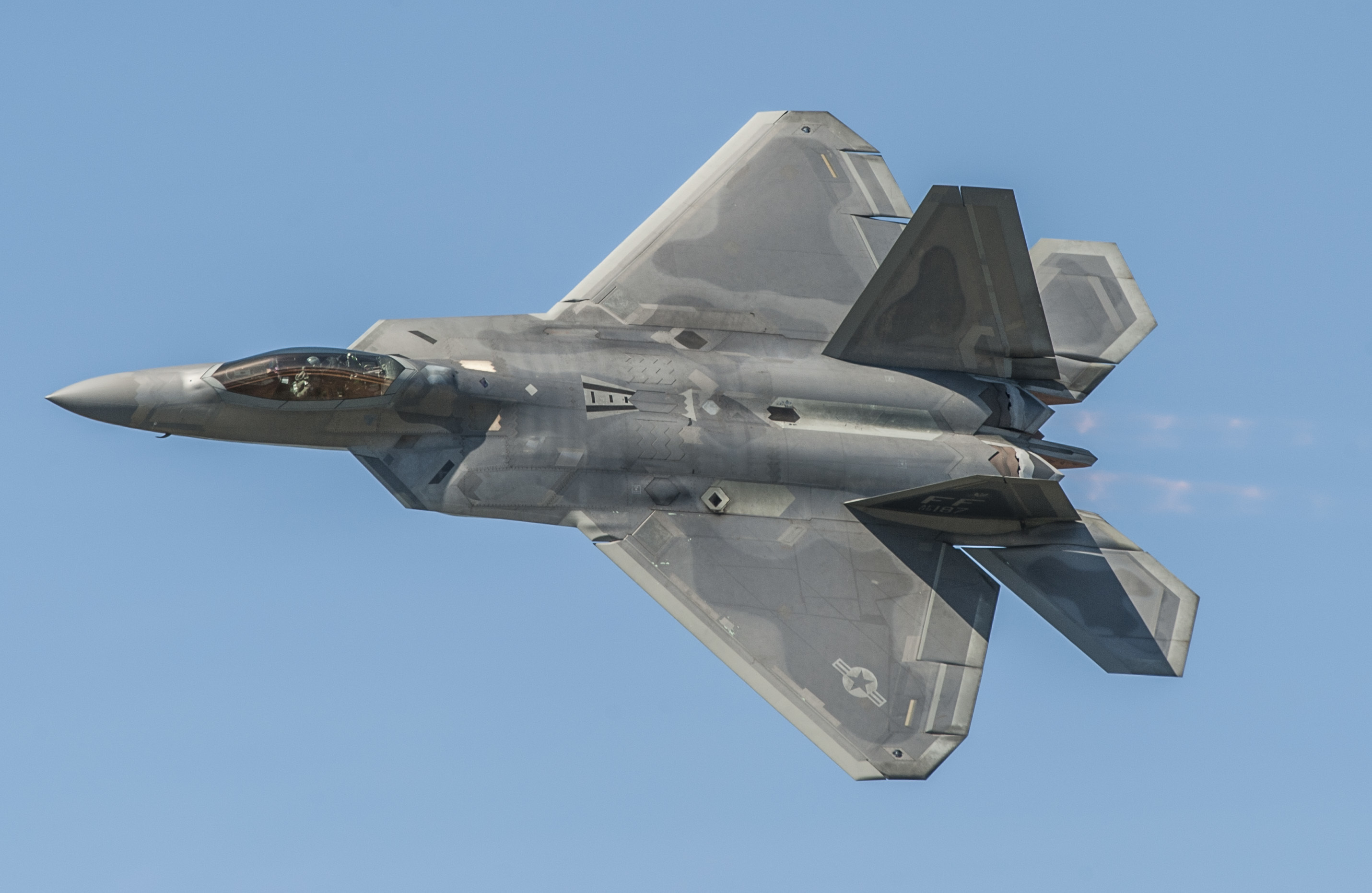
The production F-22 Raptor

The selection decision has been speculated by aviation observers to have involved industrial factors and perception of program management as much as the technical merit of the aircraft designs. At the time, Northrop was viewed as riskier because it was struggling with the B-2 and AGM-137 TSSAM programs in terms of meeting cost, schedule, and predicted stealth performance. In contrast, Lockheed's program management on the F-117 was lauded for meeting performance and delivering on schedule and within budget, with the aircraft achieving operational success over Panama and during the Gulf War. While the YF-23 air vehicle was in a higher state of maturity and refinement compared to the YF-22 due to the latter's late redesign and partly as a result had better flight performance, the Lockheed team executed a more aggressive flight test plan with considerably higher number of sorties and hours flown. Furthermore, Lockheed chose to execute high-visibility tests such as firing missiles and high angle-of-attack maneuvers that, while not required, improved its perception by the USAF in managing weapons systems risk. With the overall final F-22 and F-23 designs competitive with each other in technical performance and meeting all requirements, the USAF decision then took into consideration non-technical aspects such as confidence in program management when determining the winner.

The Lockheed team and Pratt & Whitney were awarded the EMD contracts to fully develop (research, development, test & evaluation or RDT&E) and build the Advanced Tactical Fighter in August 1991. These were cost-plus contracts initially worth $9.55 billion and $1.375 billion respectively for a total of approximately $11 billion (~$22.5 billion in 2024), which did eventually grow considerably. The YF-22 design was evolved and significantly refined to become the EMD/production F-22 Raptor version, (Note: The F-22 has a similar aerodynamic layout as the YF-22, but with notable differences in the overall external geometry such as wing sweep angle (reduced from 48° to 42°), the position and design of the cockpit, tail fins and wings, and in internal structural layout.) which first flew in September 1997. However, with the dissolution of the Soviet Union in 1991 and the subsequent reductions in defense spending, the F-22's development would be "re-phased", or drawn out and extended multiple times. The program was scrutinized for its costs and less expensive alternatives such as modernized F-15 or F-16 variants were continually being proposed, even though the USAF considered the F-22 to provide the greatest capability increase against peer adversaries for the investment. Technology from the ATF would feed into follow-on tactical aviation programs such as the Joint Advanced Strike Technology (later renamed Joint Strike Fighter) that resulted in the Lockheed Martin F-35; for instance, the F-35's F135 engine is a derivative of the F-22's F119.

While the USAF adjusted its procurement goal down to 381 aircraft following the end of the Cold War, the funded number in the program of record continued to decline, dropping to 442 with the 1993 Bottom-Up Review and then to 339 at a peak rate of 36 per year by the time the EMD/production aircraft first flew. Both the F-22 and F-23 designs were later considered for modification as a medium-range supersonic regional bomber (FB-22 and FB-23 respectively), but the proposals have not come to fruition. (Note: Also competing with these regional bomber designs was the B-1R; plans for an "interim" regional bomber were dropped in the 2006 Quadrennial Defense Review, which instead favored a larger strategic bomber with much longer range.) Following flight and operational testing, the F-22 entered service in December 2005, with total EMD cost having grown to approximately $25 billion in 2005 dollars (~$38.5 billion in 2024). With no apparent air-to-air threat present and the Department of Defense focused on counterinsurgency at that time, F-22 production only reached 195 aircraft — 187 of them operational models — and ended in 2011. In all, $33.2 billion was spent on procurement for a total program cost of $63.6 billion in 2005 dollars (~$97.9 billion in 2024); the last aircraft was delivered in 2012.

== See also ==
- F/A-XX program
- Have Dash
- Joint Strike Fighter program
- Next Generation Air Dominance
