= Have Dash =

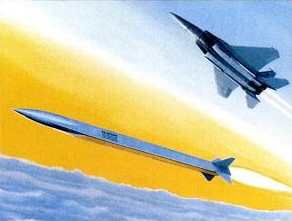
- Have Dash II
- Type: Air-to-air missile
- Place of origin: United States

Service history
- Used by: United States Air Force

Production history
- Designed: 1990–1992
- Manufacturer: Ford Aerospace

Specifications
- Mass: 400 pounds (180 kg)
- Length: 12 feet (3.7 m)
- Engine: Rocketdyne Mk 58 Mod 5
- Propellant: Solid fuel
- Operational range: 30 miles (48 km)
- Maximum speed: Mach 4+

Have Dash was a program conducted by the United States Air Force for the development of a stealthy air-to-air missile. Although the Have Dash II missile appears to have been flight tested, the results of the project remain classified, and no mass production is known to have been undertaken.

== Have Dash I ==
Have Dash I was a classified project to develop an air-to-air missile for use by stealth aircraft. The concept, developed by the USAF Armament Laboratory between 1985 and 1988, was extensively studied but failed to produce any flying hardware.

== Have Dash II ==
Have Dash II, initiated in 1990, was a renewed effort to develop a stealthy air-to-air missile, intended to be used by the Advanced Tactical Fighter – the YF-22 and YF-23 – and to replace the AIM-120 AMRAAM in service.

Have Dash II was designed with a composite body, trapezoidal in shape. This was intended both to reduce the missile's radar-cross-section and to resist heat at hypersonic speeds, as the missile was intended to operate at Mach 5. The body shape also allowed flush external carriage aboard the launching aircraft, and provided aerodynamic lift, making the missile more maneuverable.

The prototype Have Dash II missiles were recoverable, and utilised Rocketdyne Mk 58 solid-fueled rocket motors of the same type used by the AIM-7 Sparrow. Production missiles were expected to be powered by a ramjet engine, and would use inertial navigation during the cruise phase of flight, with a dual-mode infrared/active radar seeker head for terminal guidance.

Flight testing of the prototype Have Dash II missiles was expected to begin in 1992; it appears that the testing was conducted, with the missile being considered for further testing of advanced air-to-air missile concepts. However, no results of the test firings have been declassified, and no subsequent developments to the program have been reported.
