= Lockheed Senior Peg =

Experimental stealth aircraft design

The Lockheed Senior Peg was a proposal for a stealthy strategic bomber by the Lockheed Corporation together with Rockwell International for the Advanced Technology Bomber competition, which started in 1979. It competed with and lost to a design by Northrop (Senior Ice), which would eventually become the Northrop Grumman B-2 Spirit. Senior Peg resembles a larger F-117 Nighthawk.
