= ACES II =

Ejection seat system

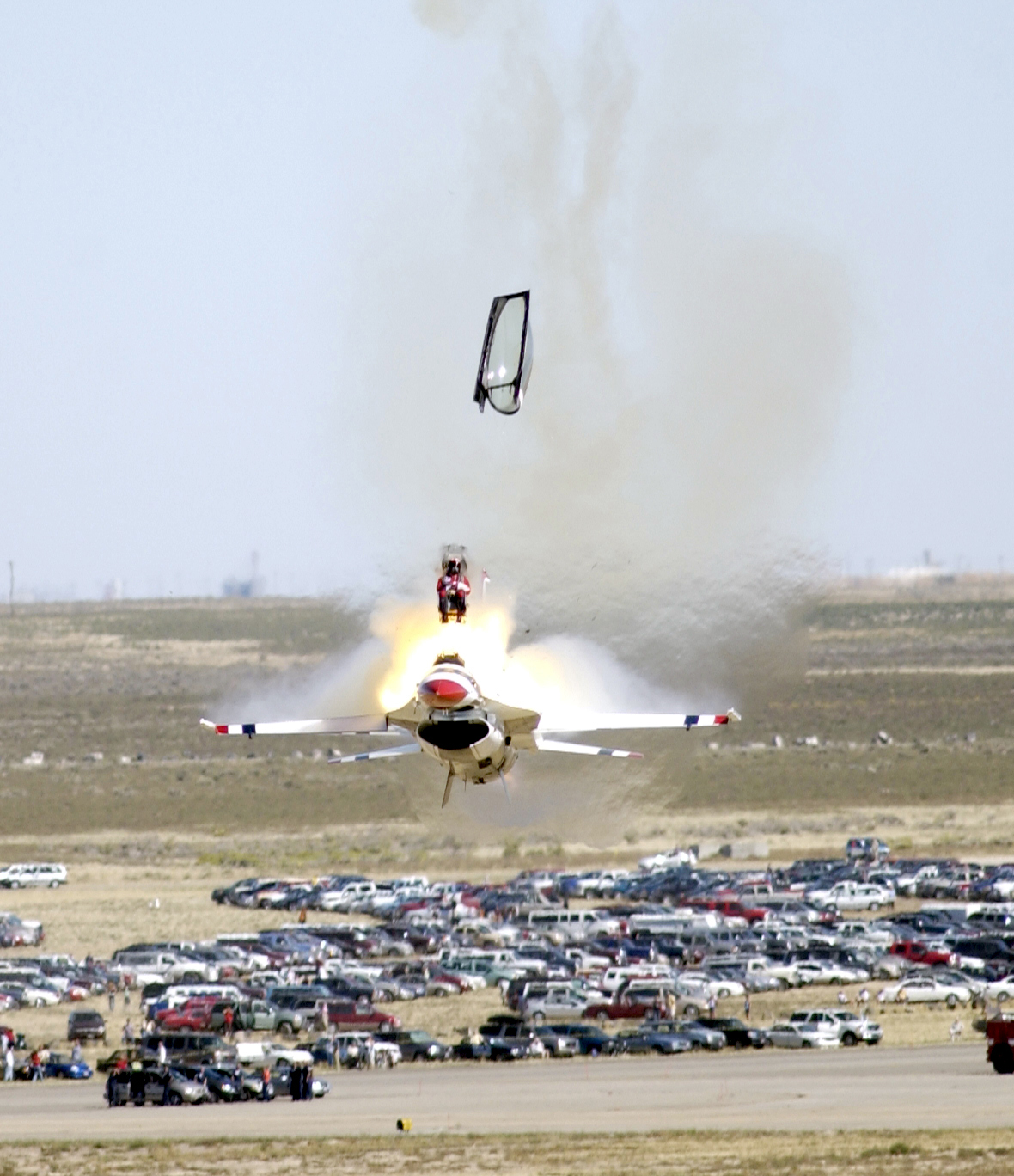
USAF Capt Christopher Stricklin ejects from his F-16 with an ACES II ejection seat on 14 September 2003 during a Thunderbirds demonstration in Idaho. Stricklin was not injured.

ACES II is an ejection seat system manufactured by the Collins Aerospace division of Raytheon Technologies (RTX). ACES is an acronym for Advanced Concept Ejection Seat. It is used in Fairchild Republic A-10 Thunderbolt II, McDonnell Douglas F-15 Eagle, General Dynamics F-16 Fighting Falcon, Lockheed Martin F-22 Raptor, Lockheed F-117 Nighthawk, Rockwell B-1 Lancer, WB-57, Northrop Grumman B-2 Spirit, and Mitsubishi F-2 aircraft. Over 10,000 ACES II seats have been produced with over 5,000 actively flying throughout the world as of 2013. It is known throughout the industry as the lowest life cycle cost third generation seat due to the USAF owning the rights to the seat, facilitating competitive replacement part procurement. In addition, the buying power of 5,000 in-service seats and previous service life extension programs have further driven down support costs.

The seat is considered third generation and includes advanced features. For example, it senses the conditions of the ejection (airspeed and altitude) and selects the appropriate drogue and main parachute deployments to minimize the forces on the occupant. The seat is controlled by a fully redundant digital electronic sequencer which makes the decisions and initiates the appropriate seat components to allow the seat to fly through the air and safely descend the aircrew to the ground. The sequencer includes a crash data recorder that contains ejection information that can be later analyzed during crash investigations to understand the dynamics of the ejection as well as loads on the aircrew during the event. The seat propulsion system is specially designed with technology to compensate for aircrew weight so that the 103 lb small female aircrew gets a similar acceleration to the 245 lb male pilot. The seat has been updated over the years through pre-planned product improvement programs to include digital sequencing, additional redundancy, enhance stability, limb restraints, structural upgrading, and passive head/neck restraints. The ACES II seat ejection injury rate is one of the lowest in the world as proven in over 600 live ejections. Back injury rates occur in only 1% of ACES ejections compared to 20% to 40% in most other ejection seats.

The A-10, F-15, F-117, B-1, and B-2 use connected firing handles that activate both the canopy jettison systems, and the seat ejection. Both handles accomplish the same task, so pulling either one suffices. The F-22, WB-57, and F-16 have only one handle located between the pilot's legs, due to cockpit space limitations.

The minimal ejection altitude for ACES II seat in inverted flight is about 140 feet (43 m) above ground level at 150 KIAS. The seat performance is in accordance with MIL-S-9479 as tailored for each aircraft application. Excellent terrain clearance performance under 250 KEAS is achieved by deploying the main parachute immediately after exiting the cockpit. It is the only ejection seat that can deploy the main parachute this early in the ejection sequence.

The ACES seat was originally developed and produced in Long Beach, CA by McDonnell Douglas. Weber Aircraft company also produced the seat as part of a USAF mandated "leader/follower" program. In the late 1980s the McDonnell Douglas production line was relocated from Long Beach, CA to Titusville, FL. The Weber Aircraft ACES production line eventually closed as USAF needs for ejection seats declined. In the late 1990s, Boeing and McDonnell Douglas merged with the combined company retaining the Boeing name. In 1999, Goodrich acquired the ACES product line from Boeing and eventually relocated the production line to Colorado Springs to the Aircraft Manufactures Inc. (AMI) facility owned by Goodrich. In 2012, United Technologies Corporation (UTC) acquired the Goodrich Corporation. In 2018, UTC acquired Rockwell Collins, Inc. and combined it with UTC Aerospace Systems to form Collins Aerospace. Today the ACES seat product line continues to be manufactured by Collins Aerospace Specialty Seating in Colorado Springs, Colorado & Collins Aerospace Universal Propulsion Co. Fairfield, California.
