= Trade study =

Analysis of merit or viability of a solution

A trade study or trade-off study, also known as a figure of merit analysis or a factor of merit analysis, is the activity of a multidisciplinary team to identify the most balanced technical solutions among a set of proposed viable solutions (FAA 2006). These viable solutions are judged by their satisfaction of a series of measures or cost functions. These measures describe the desirable characteristics of a solution. They may be conflicting or even mutually exclusive. Trade studies are commonly used in the design of aerospace and automotive vehicles and the software selection process (Phillips et al. 2002) to find the configuration that best meets conflicting performance requirements.

The measures are dependent on variables that characterize the different potential solutions. If the system can be characterized by a set of equations, one can write the definition of the trade study problem as: Find the set of variables, x_{i}, that give the best overall satisfaction to the measures:

- T_{1} = f_{1}(x_{1}, x_{2}, x_{3}.....)
- T_{2} = f_{2}(x_{1}, x_{2}, x_{3}.....)
- T_{3} = f_{3}(x_{1}, x_{2}, x_{3}.....)
- T_{N} = f_{N}(x_{1}, x_{2}, x_{3}.....)

Where T_{j} is a target value and f(...) denotes some functional relationship among the variables. Further, the equality between the target and the function may be a richer relationship, as will be developed below. If the equations are linear, as in the production volume example used as a starting point below, then this problem is solvable using linear programming techniques. Generally, one or more of the targets is not fixed at a specific value, and it is desired to make these T values as large or small as possible. These are generally referred to as cost functions, and the other measures are treated as constraints.

If the situation was as described above, formal optimization or linear programming methods would work totally. However, in practice, needed information is:

- Uncertain
- Evolving - new information is being developed that affects the trades
- Both qualitative and quantitative
- Comes from conflicting sources - in systems engineering, many people have some of the information needed; no one person has it all.
- The best choice comes from a team, building a shared mental model of the situation.

== See also ==
- Robust decision
