= Flyaway cost =

Type of measurement for the cost of an aircraft

Flyaway cost is a measure of the cost of an aircraft. It values the aircraft at its marginal cost, including only the cost of production and production tools essential for building a single unit. It excludes sunk costs such as research and development, supplementary costs such as support equipment, and future costs such as spares and maintenance.

There are other possible measures of aircraft cost:

- The sum of the aggregate flyaway cost and the research and development cost divided by the number of aircraft, equivalent to the average total production cost
- Total cost over the lifetime of the aircraft program, including maintenance, divided by the number of aircraft, equivalent to average total cost including maintenance

The flyaway cost can be meaningfully compared to another cost metric, the procurement cost. The procurement cost (often referred to for military aircraft as the weapons system cost) is the total price of the aircraft. A good way of looking at the difference is that the flyaway cost is the cost of making the aircraft, while the procurement cost is the cost of buying the aircraft. Procurement costs may include ancillary equipment costs, one time non-recurring contract costs, and airframe, engine and avionics support costs. For example, the flyaway cost for the Boeing F/A-18E/F Super Hornet up to 2009 (for the 449 units built) was US$ 57.5 million per unit, but the procurement cost was 39.8% higher, at US$ 80.4 million per unit. The production cost of technologically complicated aircraft will always be higher during the low rate initial production (LRIP) period, and costs per units invariably drop as an aircraft is put into full production. The Government Accountability Office has found that the United States Department of Defense rarely achieves these cost savings because few programs move from LRIP to full-scale production.
