= AGM-188 Rusty Dagger =

American aerial stand-off munition

AGM-188A Rusty Dagger
- Type: Subsonic cruise missile
- Place of origin: United States

Service history
- In service: 2026-present

Production history
- Manufacturer: Zone 5 Technologies
- Unit cost: USD$246,000

Specifications
- Mass: Approx. 500 lb (227 kg)
- Length: 104 in (2.64 m)
- Warhead: Conventional warhead
- Warhead weight: 100 lb (45.4 kg)
- Engine: PBS TJ80 turbojet
- Operational range: greater than 500 nmi (575 mi; 926 km)
- Maximum speed: High subsonic
- Launch platform: AH-64 Apache; AH-1Z Viper; F-35A/B/C; Strategic bombers F-15E/EX; F/A-18E/F; F-16; Ground-launched; Ship-launched; Rapid Dragon

The AGM-188A Rusty Dagger is a low-cost air-launched cruise missile being developed by Zone 5 Technologies for the United States Air Force (USAF) Extended Range Attack Munition (ERAM) program which started in August 2024. If selected, the weapon is expected to enter service in late 2026.

== Design ==
Two separate designs by non-traditional defense companies CoAspire and Zone 5 Technologies will be manufactured. The USAF issued contracts for the ERAM in October 2024 and both designs made a first flight four months later. The program has a $225 million budget, and is managed by the Air Force Life Cycle Management Center Armament Directorate.

The ERAM is described as a hybrid between a cruise missile and an advanced guided bomb, carrying a 500 pounds (230 kg) warhead to a range of up to 280 miles (450 km), at speeds of at least 430 mph (690 km/h).

The requirements are in line with Boeing's PJDAM (a powered derivative of the JDAM), a powered version of Raytheon's Joint Stand-Off Weapon (JSOW) glide bomb, or those of Northrop Grumman's "Gray Wolf" design. The weapon was assigned the designation AGM-188A with name "Rusty Dagger".

== Delivery plans ==
It is planned to deliver a first batch of 840 ERAMs in October 2026. Ukraine will receive some of this batch for use in the Russo-Ukrainian War, and is cleared to purchase up to 3,350 ERAMs including spares and support equipment for an estimated cost of $825 million. Ukraine is expected to use funding from Denmark, the Netherlands, Norway and United States Foreign Military Financing for the purchase.

In June 2026, it was reported by defense news site The War Zone that a test batch of the AGM-188 had already been received by Ukraine, with some missiles having been "field tested" in combat in Russia, with Russian sources reporting recovery of "an unknown 8-element CRPA antenna" from a "Rusty Dagger" cruise missile.

== Employment ==
In July 2026, multiple pieces of likely AGM-188A debris recovered from sites in Russia and associated with Ukrainian strikes, were reported. Strikes were carried out starting in June 2026, and the strike on Voronezh Semiconductor Plant was launched from Mig-29 and Su-27 platforms.

== See also ==
- Multi-mission Affordable Capacity Effector
- GBU-39 Small Diameter Bomb
