= Rapid Dragon =

Rapid Dragon may refer to:

- Rapid Dragon (siege weapon)
- Rapid Dragon (missile system)
