= Curti Zefhir =

Italian two-seat turbine helicopter

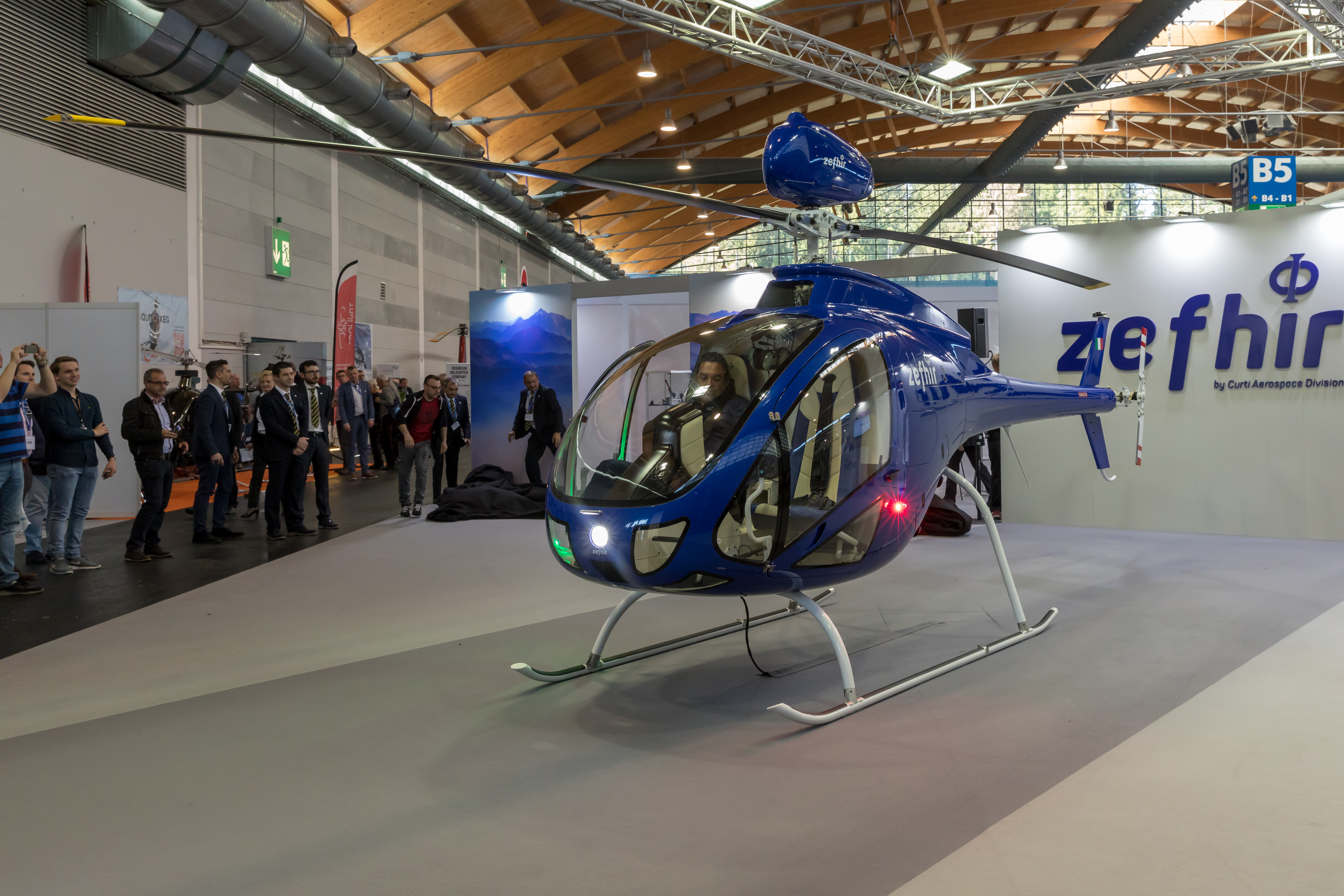

General information
- Type: two-seat light-single turbine helicopter
- National origin: Italy
- Manufacturer: Curti Aerospace

History
- First flight: 2017

The Curti Zefhir is a two-seat light-single turbine-powered recreational or trainer helicopter designed and produced by Italian aircraft manufacturer Curti Aerospace. Development was partly funded by the European Commission. It performed its maiden flight in 2017 and was commercially launched at the April 2018 AERO Friedrichshafen. Curti aim to secure type certification of the Zefhir as an ultralight aircraft.

== Development ==
=== Background ===
The Zefhir is developed by Italian aircraft manufacturer Curti Aerospace, a subsidiary of an industrial group active for more than 60 years in the mechanical engineering sector and specialized in industrial automation, packaging machinery and certified aeronautical light alloys parts manufacturing. For over 40 years, Curti has produced subassemblies and components for aerospace and defense companies, including Italian giant Leonardo S.p.A.

Curti saw a market opportunity for a better-designed light helicopter powered by a more powerful engine. Development began in 2013 after Curti formed a partnership with Czech engine maker PBS Velká Bíteš (PBSVB) and German company Junkers Profly. The rotorcraft has been developed under the DISRUPT project for reliable and secure ultralight helicopters; it was partially funded by the European Commission to support small and medium enterprises, in addition to regional financing.

=== Launch and testing ===
In April 2018, the Zefhir was launched at the AERO Friedrichshafen tradeshow in Germany, seeking for German ultralight approval and countries recognizing this certification. By late 2018, Curti expected a 2019 service entry.

By September 2018, the whole-aircraft parachute recovery system was successfully tested, with a descent rate and ground impact within crash tests requirements. The aircraft was unmanned and remotely piloted for early tests. Its unique whole-aircraft ballistic parachute was co-developed between Curti and Junkers Profly.

== Design ==
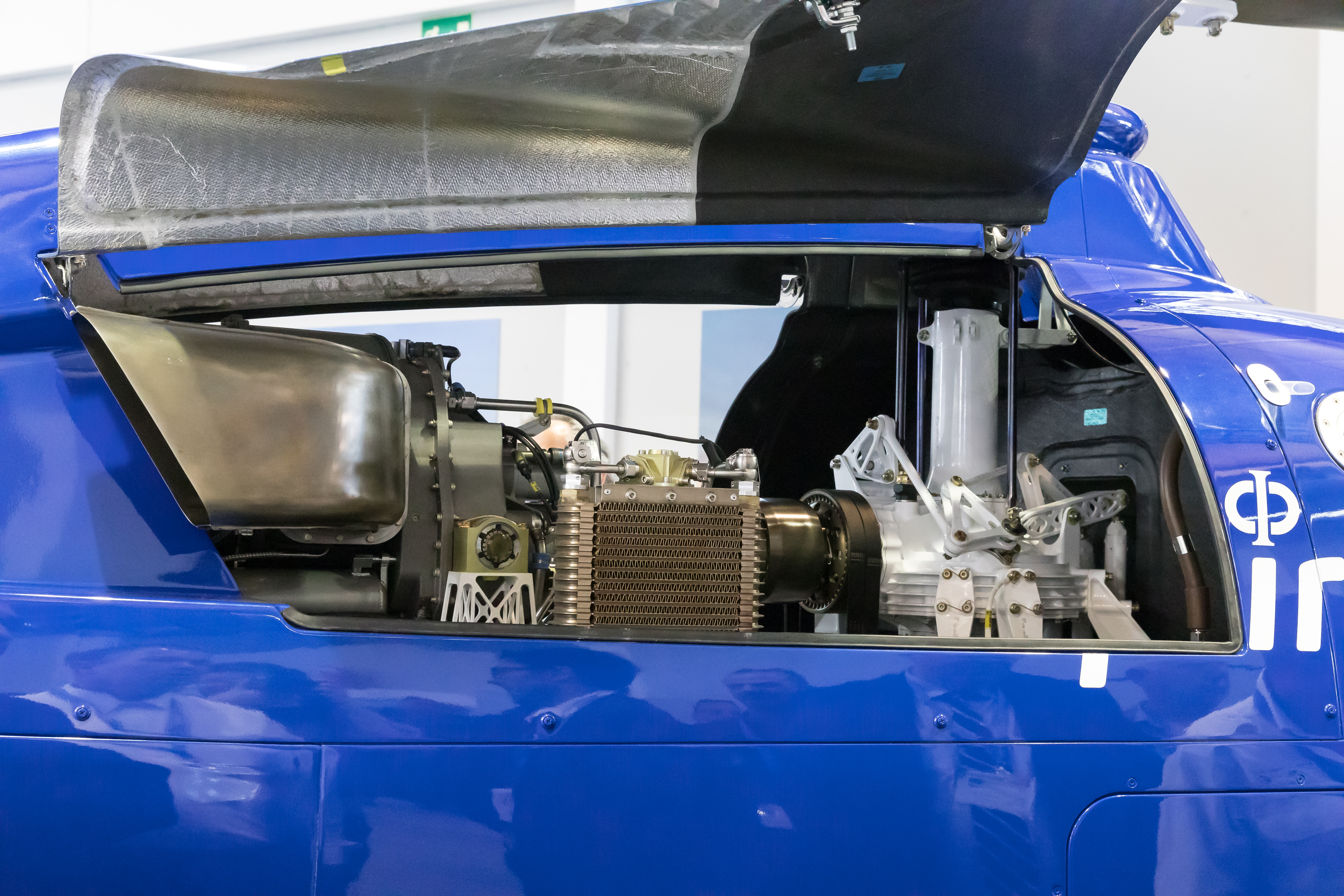
Engine compartment

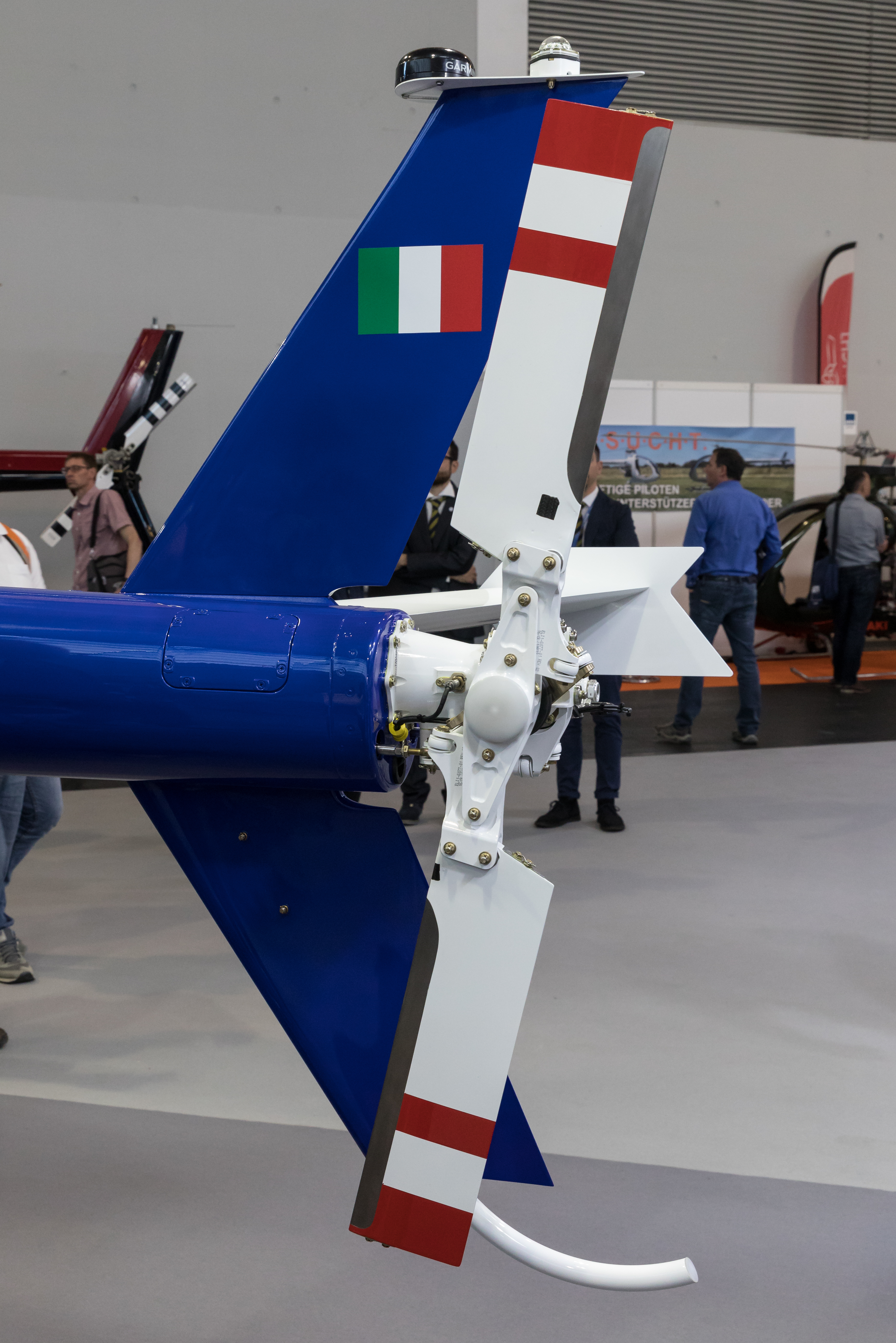
Tail rotor

The Zefhir complies with EASA CS-27 requirements for larger helicopters and its critical flight elements are tested accordingly. The airframe is entirely made of lightweight composite materials, as are the rotor blades. Composites materials also permitted to optimise the aerodynamic design. Its low weight and compact size allows an ultralight certification.

To recover without autorotation, the Zefhir is fitted with a ballistic parachute safety system. It is stored in a non-rotating box above the main rotor, attached to the airframe through a fixed shaft inside the rotor mast. Other systems includes a glass cockpit.

PBSVB manufactures the Zefhir’s turboshaft, derated from 241 to 141 shp (180 to 105 kW) maximum continuously, and optimally controlled by FADEC. Its performance is consistent under adverse weather conditions or when flown at high altitude or high temperatures. The engine drives a two-bladed main rotor with a profile maximising efficiency while lowering noise pollution.

== Specifications ==
Data from Curti Aerospace

General characteristics

- Capacity: two
- Max takeoff weight: 699 kg (1,540 lb), DULV ultralight: 600 kg
- Powerplant: 1 × PBS Velká Bíteš PBS TS100 turboshaft, 105 kW (141 hp) maximum continuous
- Propellers: 2-bladed
- Maximum speed: 185 km/h (115 mph, 100 kn) level
- Range: 319 km (198 mi, 172 nmi) at 87 kn (161 km/h), 10-min reserve

== See also ==
Aircraft of comparable role, configuration, and era

- Enstrom F-28
- Guimbal Cabri G2
- Robinson R22
- Schweizer 300

Related lists

- List of ultralight helicopters
