= PBS AI-PBS-350 =

Turbojet engine

AI-PBS-350
- Type: Jet aircraft engine
- National origin: Czech Republic
- Manufacturer: PBS Velká Bíteš and Ivchenko-Progress
- Major applications: Palianytsia

The AI-PBS-350 is a turbojet engine jointly developed by Czech manufacturer PBS Velká Bíteš and the Ukrainian design bureau Ivchenko-Progress. The engine is marketed for use in missiles and large unmanned aerial systems. As of 2024, it is currently the highest thrust engine developed by PBS, exceeding the thrust of PBS's next highest engine, the PBS TJ150.

== History ==
On the 19th of June, 2023, PBS Velká Bíteš and Ivchenko-Progress signed a memorandum of understanding, detailing the framework from which the engine would be developed and produced.

Concerns were raised about Ivchenko-Progress' capability to produce the engine, with its headquarters in Zaporizhzhia, a city heavily affected by the Russian invasion of Ukraine. Ivor Kravchenko, the director general for Ivchenko-Progress stated that while the factory had sustained damage, it continues to operate, with strong backing from the Ukrainian government enabling it to maintain its 3000 strong workforce.

The engine was displayed at the 2024 Farnborough International Airshow, along with other products from PBS, such as turbine engines, Auxiliary power units and environmental control systems.

== Design ==
The AI-PBS-350 is a compact turbojet engine optimized for single mission UAV systems. It features a four stage compressor, driven by a single stage turbine. It has a digital engine control unit and a fuel metering pump. Along with pyrotechnic ignition, it also utilizes windmill starting, wherein the aircraft uses its forward momentum to turn the rotor blades, reducing the weight of the system and improving performance.

== Specifications ==
Data from

==== General characteristics ====
- Type: turbojet
- Length: 706 mm
- Diameter: 298 mm
- Dry weight: 51 kg

==== Components ====
- Compressor: four-stage axial compressor
- Turbine: single-stage axial turbine

==== Performance ====
- Maximum thrust: 3400 N
- Specific fuel consumption: 0.125 lb/(lbf⋅h) (3.5 g/(kN⋅s))
- Thrust-to-weight ratio: 6.1÷1
