= Extended Range Attack Munition =

American aerial stand-off munition

The Extended Range Attack Munition (ERAM) is a United States Air Force (USAF) development program for a class of low-cost precision-guided air-launched stand-off munition which started in August 2024. The initial weapon types, the AGM-188 and AGM-189, are expected to enter service in late 2026.

== Design ==
Two separate designs by non-traditional defense companies CoAspire and Zone 5 Technologies will be manufactured. The USAF issued contracts for the ERAM in October 2024 and both designs made a first flight four months later. The program has a $225 million budget, and is managed by the Air Force Life Cycle Management Center Armament Directorate.

The ERAM is described as a hybrid between a cruise missile and an advanced guided bomb, carrying a 500 pounds (230 kg) warhead to a range of up to 280 miles (450 km), at speeds of at least 430 mph (690 km/h).

The requirements are in line with Boeing's PJDAM (a powered derivative of the JDAM), a powered version of Raytheon’s Joint Stand-Off Weapon (JSOW) glide bomb, or those of Northrop Grumman's "Gray Wolf" design. The two designs currently being evaluated are Zone 5 Technologies AGM-188 and Anduril Industries AGM-189.

== Delivery plans ==
It is planned to deliver a first batch of 840 ERAMs in October 2026. Ukraine will receive some of this batch for use in the Russo-Ukrainian War, and is cleared to purchase up to 3,350 ERAMs including spares and support equipment for an estimated cost of $825 million. Ukraine is expected to use funding from Denmark, the Netherlands, Norway and United States Foreign Military Financing for the purchase.

== See also ==
- Multi-mission Affordable Capacity Effector
- GBU-39 Small Diameter Bomb
