= PBS TJ100 =

Czech jet engine

TJ100
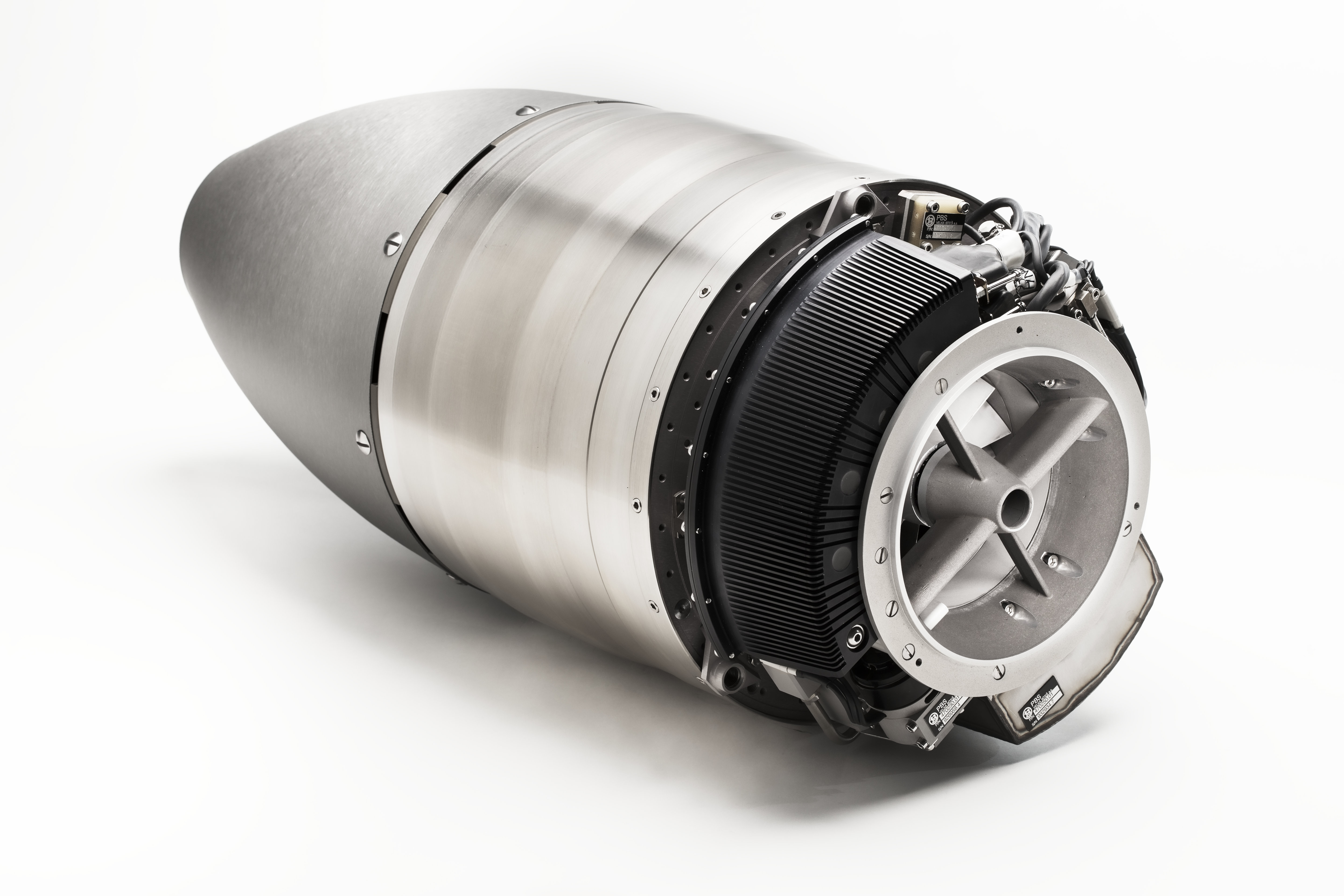
- Type: Jet aircraft engine
- National origin: Czech Republic
- Manufacturer: PBS Velká Bíteš
- Major applications: Bede BD-5J; Sonex Aircraft SubSonex
- Manufactured: 2003–present

The PBS TJ100 is a Czech turbojet engine produced by PBS Velká Bíteš. The TJ100 engine entered service in 2003, and is the most popular of PBS's turbojet engines as more than 1,000 engines have been sold to 40 countries worldwide. The engine has been developed for unmanned aerial vehicles, including target drones, remote carriers, unmanned combat aerial systems, light experimental jet aircraft, and light sport aircraft.

== Design and development ==
The PBS TJ100 is a small single-shaft turbojet engine with a built-in starter-generator that enables starting on the ground and in-flight. A windmilling option starts the engine in under 7 seconds. Multiple variants were developed from the original PBS TJ100, one enables salt water recovery.

Another PBS turbojet engine, the PBS TJ150, was developed from the original PBS TJ100 design.

The engine was chosen for the Sonex Aircraft SubSonex homebuilt aircraft in 2009, due to it being a "full-featured production engine", replacing the originally used engine that had been derived from a model aircraft jet engine. Sonex Aircraft indicated that the TJ100's advantages including a dedicated oil system, use of high-quality components, pre-wired instrumentation and throttle controls allowing fast installation. The use of the TJ100 sped up the development time for the SubSonex.

== Applications ==
- Bede BD-5J Micro
- Sonex Aircraft SubSonex

== Specifications ==
==== General characteristics ====
- Type: turbojet
- Length: 25.04 in (636 mm)
- Diameter: 10.71 in (272 mm)
- Dry weight: 38.80 lb (17.60 kg)

==== Components ====
- Compressor:

==== Performance ====
- Maximum thrust: 247-281 lbf (1,100-1,250 N)
- Thrust-to-weight ratio: 7.2:1
