= Ballistic parachute =

Parachute that quick opens via an explosion

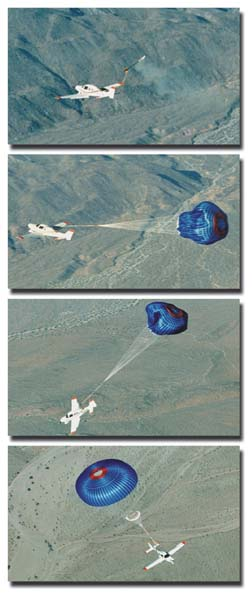
1998 photo series showing a Cirrus ballistic parachute deployment in action

A ballistic parachute, ballistic reserve parachute, or emergency ballistic reserve parachute, is a parachute ejected from its casing by a small explosion, much like that used in an ejection seat. The advantage of the ballistic parachute over a conventional parachute is that it ejects the parachute canopy (oftentimes via a small rocket), causing it to open rapidly, thus making it ideal for attaching to light aircraft, hang gliders and microlights, where an emergency may occur in close proximity to the ground. In such a situation, a conventional parachute would not open quickly enough.

In 1982, Comco Ikarus developed the FRS rocket-launched parachute system for its ultralight and hanglider aircraft. In 1999, Cirrus Aircraft (then known as Cirrus Design) provided the first ballistic parachutes as standard equipment on their line of type-certified aircraft, the Cirrus SR20; and in 2016, the company delivered the Cirrus Vision SF50, the first jet aircraft with a ballistic parachute. The Curti Zefhir is the first helicopter fitted with a ballistic parachute, successfully tested in 2018.

== See also ==
- Index of aviation articles
- Ballistic Recovery Systems – manufacturer of ballistic parachutes for use in light aircraft
- Scott D. Anderson – test pilot who flight tested the first certified ballistic parachute
