= PBS TS100 =

Helicopter turboshaft engine

- Type: Turboshaft
- National origin: Czech Republic
- Manufacturer: PBS Velká Bíteš
- Major applications: Curti Zefhir; Softex Aero VV-2; ACC Thunder Wasp GT
- Developed from: PBS TP100

The PBS TS100 is a small turboshaft engine manufactured by the Czech company PBS Velká Bíteš. The engine produces up to 180 kW (241 hp). It's intended for unmanned aerial vehicles and light helicopters with a maximum take-off weight of 1,000 kg (2,205 lb).

== Design ==
The TS100 has a gas generator and a separate free power turbine, which drives the output shaft through a reduction gearbox.

The engine has self-contained fuel and lubrication systems, a brushless electric starter-generator and a digital ECU. The ECU adjusts gas-generator speed to maintain a constant output-shaft speed and controls automatic cooling of components after shutdown. The engine can be controlled through an analogue or digital interface.

Maximum continuous power is 160 kW (215 hp), available up to an altitude of 2,000 m (6,560 ft).

== Development ==
The Czech Ministry of Industry and Trade funded research on the TS100 between 2010 and 2013. The TS100 was based on the TP100 turboprop. Both engines used a gas-generator core derived from the TJ100 turbojet. The project aimed to develop a new reduction gearbox and reduce the engine’s specific fuel consumption.

By January 2022, PBS had supplied a TS100 to the Korea Aerospace Research Institute for the technology-demonstration phase of a hybrid-propulsion research programme.

== Variants ==
The TS100 is offered in two variants with different output-shaft speeds:

- TS100ZA: 5,978 rpm
- TS100DA: 2,158 rpm

== Applications ==
- Curti Zefhir
- Softex Aero VV-2
- ACC Thunder Wasp GT
- Avio Solution G-250 Eagle

== Specifications (TS100ZA) ==
The engine is 398 mm (15.7 in) high and 330 mm (13.0 in) wide, excluding the exhaust.

Data from PBS

==== General characteristics ====
- Type: Turboshaft
- Length: 829 mm (32.6 in)
- Diameter:
- Dry weight: 56.7 kg (125.0 lb)

==== Components ====
- Compressor:
- Turbine: Gas-generator turbine and separate free power turbine
- Fuel type: Jet A, Jet A-1, Jet B, TS-1, T2 or RT

==== Performance ====
- Maximum power output: 180 kW (241 hp) (take-off)
  160 kW (215 hp) (maximum continuous)
  140 kW (188 hp) (cruise)
- Power-to-weight ratio: 3.17 kW/kg (1.93 hp/lb), at take-off power
