= PBS Velká Bíteš =

Czech engineering and manufacturing company

První brněnská strojírna Velká Bíteš, a. s.

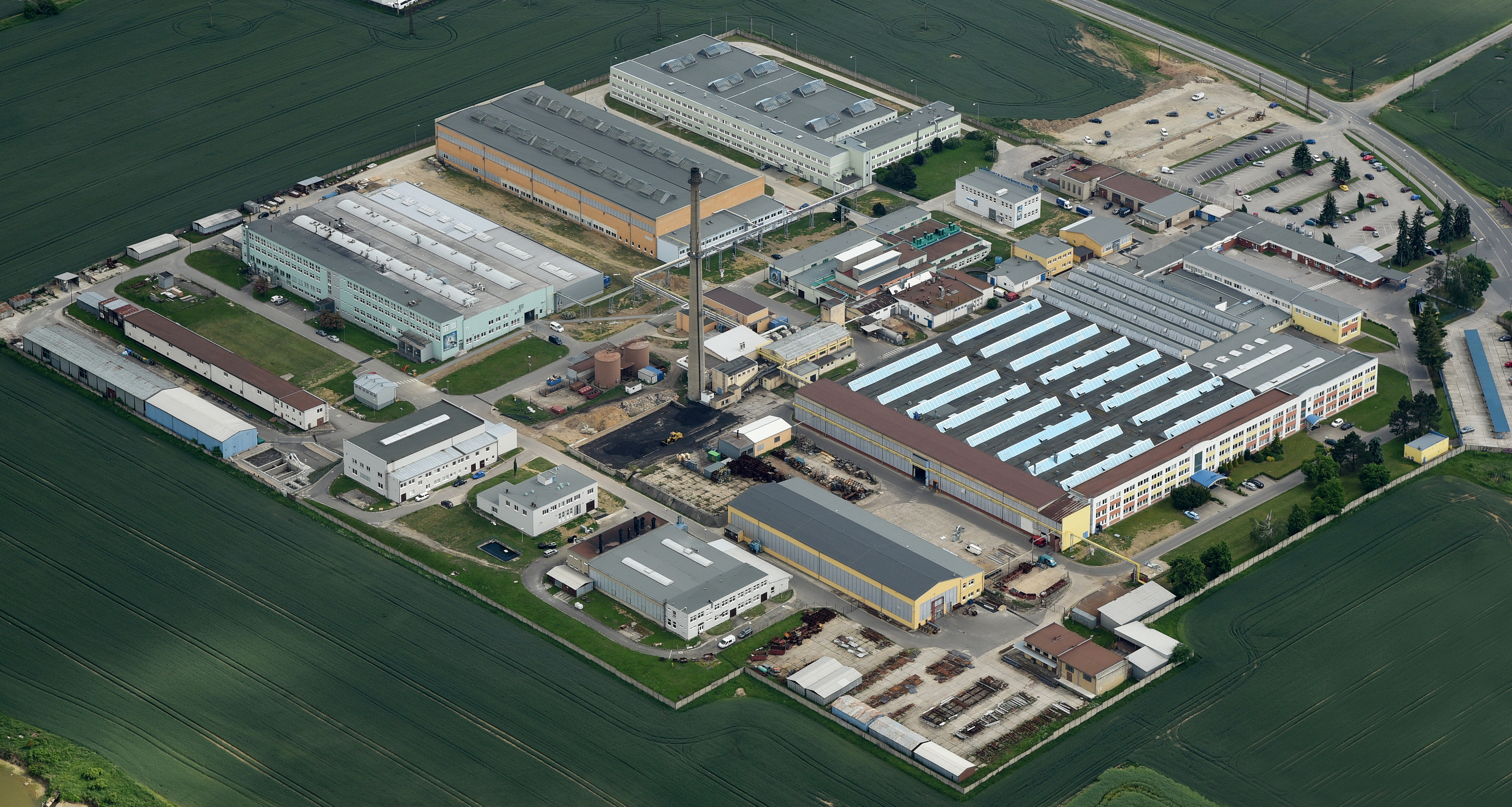
- PBS Velká Bíteš factory
- Type: Joint-stock company
- Industry: Aerospace, mechanical engineering
- Founded: 1950
- Headquarters: Velká Bíteš, Czech Republic
- Key people: Milan Macholán (CEO and chairman)
- Products: Small turbine engines, auxiliary power units, aircraft environmental control systems, precision castings, cryogenic equipment
- Revenue: CZK 2.537 billion (2025)
- Number of employees: 781 (2025)
- Parent: PBS Group
- Website: www.pbs.cz/en/

První brněnská strojírna Velká Bíteš, a.s., commonly known as PBS Velká Bíteš, is a Czech aerospace and engineering company based in Velká Bíteš. It develops and manufactures small turbojet engines used in unmanned aerial vehicles and missiles, as well as auxiliary power units, aircraft environmental control systems, precision castings and cryogenic equipment.

Manufacturing at the Velká Bíteš site dates to 1950. The plant later developed aerospace equipment including auxiliary power units, before beginning development of its own small turbojet engines in the early 2000s.

In the 2020s, production expanded substantially amid growing demand for propulsion systems for defence applications.

== History ==
The factory at Velká Bíteš was established in 1950 as part of První brněnská strojírna, an engineering enterprise based in Brno. Its origins date to 1814, when Jan Reiff and Jakub Friedrich Schöll arrived in the area. They opened a spinning mill in 1816, and the business later turned to engineering.

The first products produced in PBS VB were hammer drills and parts for mining and metallurgical pneumatic tools. Production of industrial valves began in 1951.

The factory began making turbochargers for diesel engines in 1957. Construction of its precision-casting foundry started ten years later. The foundry opened in October 1969, making turbine blades at first and later complete turbine wheels and other parts.

=== Entry into aerospace ===
Work on aircraft equipment began in 1967, when Aero approached the factory about developing a turbine starter for the L-39 Albatros training aircraft. In October 1970, PBS entered into a licensing agreement with the French manufacturer Microturbo for the Saphir 5 air generator, which supplied compressed air to start the aircraft’s main engine. PBS built the first Saphir 5 at Velká Bíteš in 1972. It passed its initial tests in 1973, when deliveries also began.

PBS then developed aircraft environmental-control equipment and more capable auxiliary power units. Development of the Safír 5M began in 1980, adapting the licensed Saphir design to supply electricity as well as compressed air. The factory also worked on an auxiliary power unit for the Let L-610 regional airliner.

=== Restructuring and engine development ===
PBS Velká Bíteš became a joint-stock company on 1 January 1991. During the early 1990s, it faced declining demand in its eastern European markets. By February 2000, the investment company Image Group had acquired an 85% interest in the business.

The turbocharger business was transferred to PBS Turbo, a joint venture established with MAN in 1997. MAN acquired a majority interest in 2000 and became its sole owner in 2005.

PBS began supplying equipment for the Aero L-159 in the late 1990s, including its starting system, air conditioning and main gearbox. Orders for the L-159 and L-610 fell short of expectations, leaving PBS looking for other customers. It adapted the its auxiliary power unit for use in Mil helicopters.

In the early 2000s, PBS began developing its own small turbojet engines. Testing of the first TJ100 prototype began in 2002, and the first production engine was delivered to a Spanish target-drone customer in 2004. The TJ100 was later used in drones, target aircraft and small aircraft flown by pilots.

Development of the TP100 turboprop began in 2008 in cooperation with the Czech Aerospace Research Centre, VZLÚ. Flight testing aboard Brno University of Technology’s VUT 061 Turbo aircraft began in August 2013. From 2011 to 2016, PBS led ESPOSA, an EU-funded project to improve small aircraft engines and the methods used to make and install them. EASA certified the TJ100C in September 2014.

Four years later, PBS introduced two more turbojets: the TJ80 and the TJ150.

=== Expansion in the 2020s ===
Following Russia’s invasion of Ukraine in February 2022, PBS said it stopped supplying the Russian market and closed its Moscow office. In June 2023, it signed a memorandum with the Ukrainian engine designer Ivchenko-Progress covering cooperation on the AI-PBS-350 turbojet.

PBS invested in new machinery and expanded production at Velká Bíteš as orders for drone and missile engines increased. In 2025, it made more than twice as many engines for unmanned aircraft as in the previous year. It also supplied TJ100 engines to MBDA. In September that year, PBS Group agreed to work with Pratt & Whitney on an auxiliary power unit for military and commercial aircraft.

== Ownership and operations ==
PBS Velká Bíteš is part of PBS Group, a Czech engineering holding company. The group also operates PBS Aerospace in Roswell, Georgia, and PBS India in Bengaluru.

In October 2026, PBS Energo, another group company involved in power engineering, was merged into PBS Velká Bíteš, which became its legal successor.

PBS Velká Bíteš holds design and production organization approvals under EASA. It also holds corresponding design, production and maintenance approvals for military aviation.

== Products and services ==
PBS VB develops and manufactures small turbojet, turboprop and turboshaft engines, auxiliary power units and environmental-control systems.

The company also makes precision castings and cryogenic equipment, including helium expansion turbines, compressors and pumps.

=== Aerospace products ===
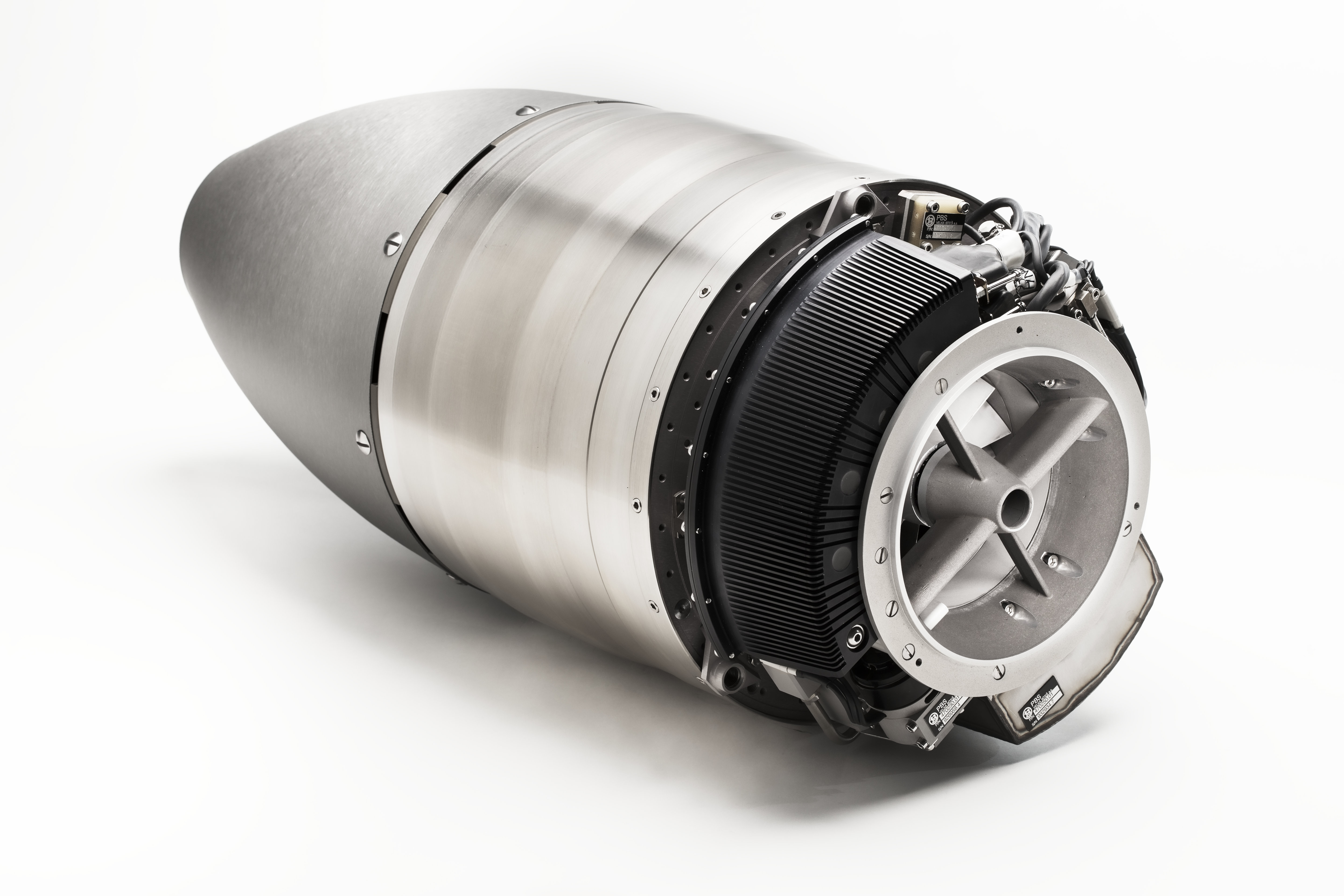
PBS TJ100

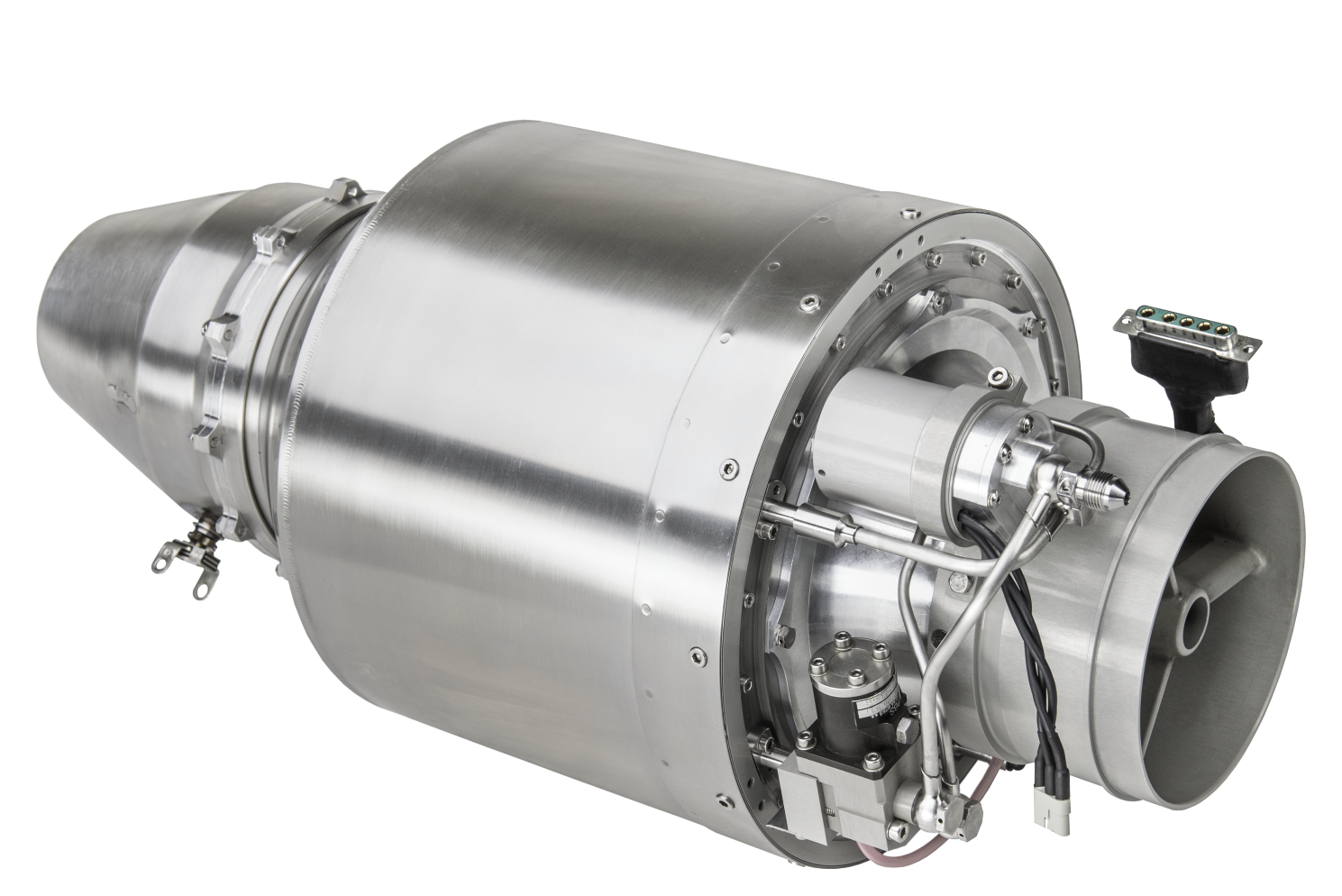
PBS TJ80

==== Turbojet engines ====
Engine name	Max thrust	Outer diameter	Length	Weight
PBS TJ40-G1	395 N	147mm	304mm	3.3 kg
PBS TJ40-G2	395 N	147mm	373mm	3.8 kg
PBS TJ80-120	1,200 N	235 mm	514mm	12.8 kg
PBS TJ100	1,300 N	272mm	625mm	19.5 kg
PBS TJ150	1,500 N	272mm	520mm	19.6 kg
PBS TJ200	2,280 N	246mm	730mm	28 kg
AI-PBS-350	3,400 N	298mm	706mm	51 kg

==== Turboprop engines ====
Model	Maximum power	Output-shaft speed	Length	Weight
PBS TP100	180 kW	2,158 rpm	891 mm	61.6 kg

==== Turboshaft engines ====
Model	Maximum power	Output-shaft speed	Length	Weight
PBS TS100ZA	180 kW	5,978 rpm	829 mm	56.7 kg
PBS TS100DA	180 kW	2,158 rpm	881 mm	61.3 kg

==== Auxiliary power units ====
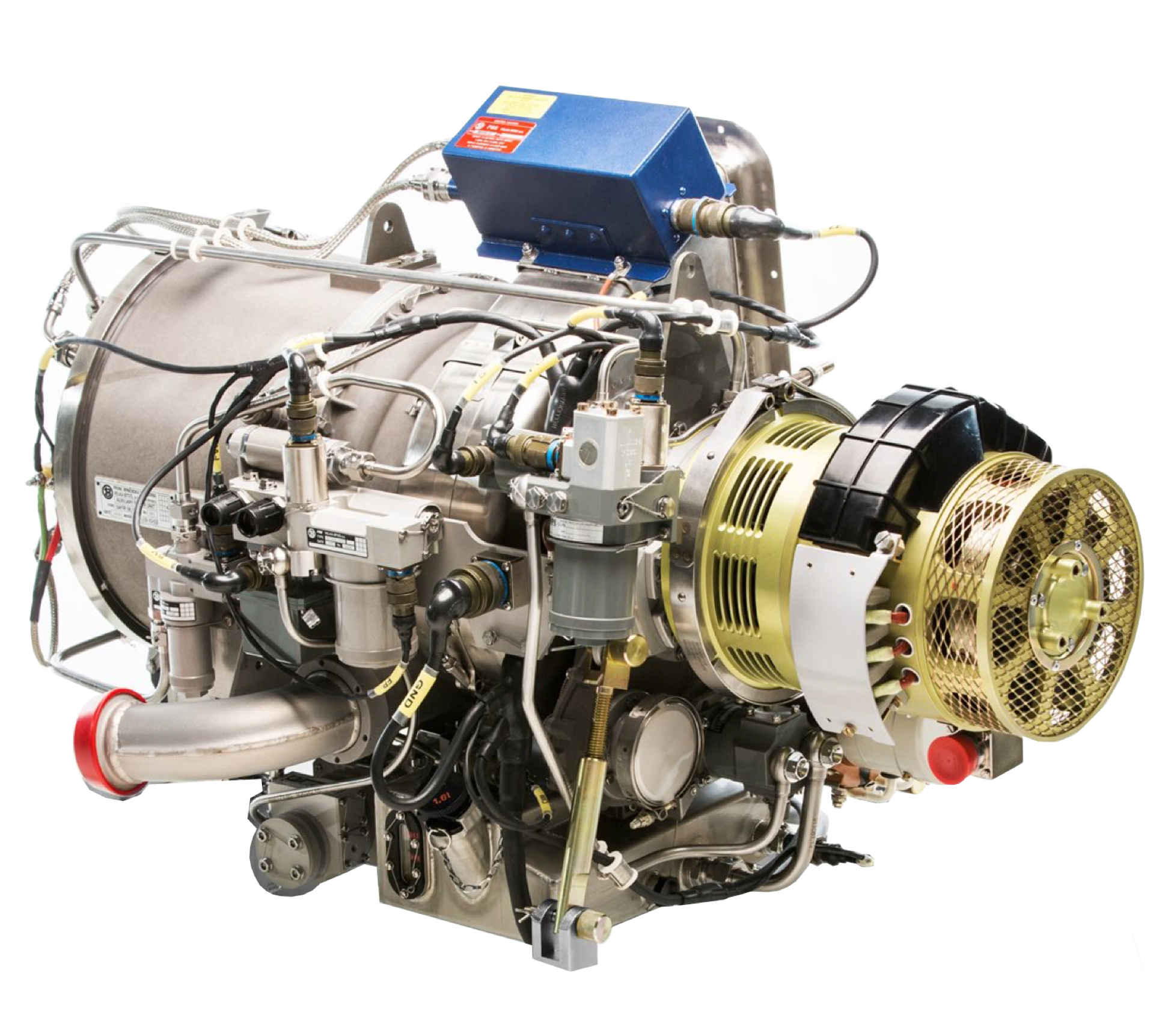
SAFIR 5K/G MI

Model	Aircraft applications	Electrical output	Dry weight
Safír 5K/G MI	Mi-8/17 helicopters	20 kVA	72 Kg
Safír 5K/G MIS	Mi-17/171 helicopters	6 kW	64.5 Kg
Safír 5L	Transport and military aircraft	None	42 Kg
Safír 5K/G Z8	Transport and multipurpose aircraft	40 kVA	51.5 Kg
SPARK40	Helicopters and UAVs	45 kVA	66 Kg

==== Environmental control systems ====
PBS develops and manufactures environmental-control systems for helicopters, jet trainers, light combat aircraft, regional aircraft and large unmanned aircraft. Its equipment includes air-cycle machines, turbocooling units, control valves and cabin-pressure control systems.

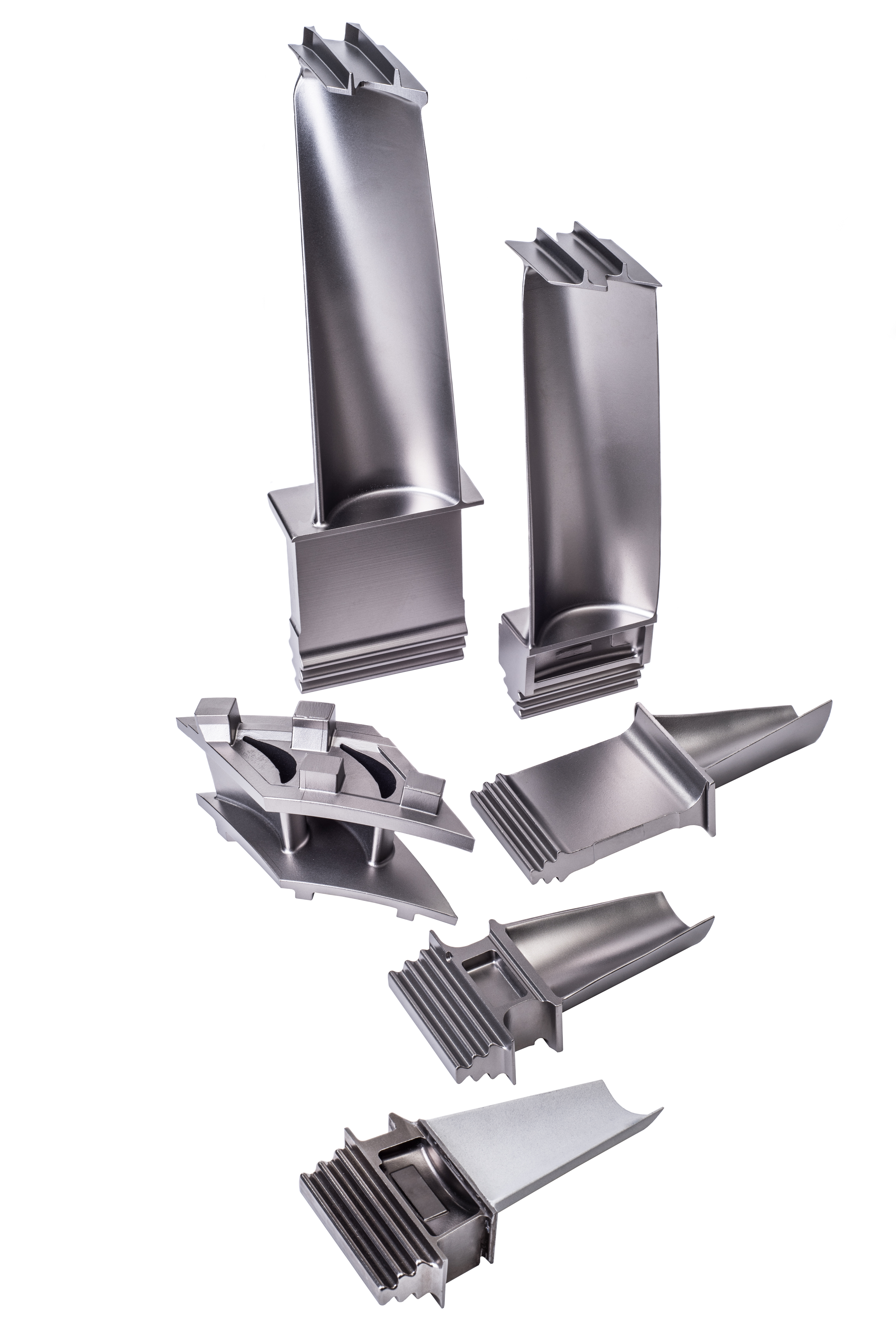
Turbine blades

=== Precision casting ===
PBS produces precision castings from nickel- and cobalt-based superalloys. Materials used for turbine wheels include IN 713C, IN 713LC and MAR-M247. Its products include:

- Turbine wheels for turbochargers
- Turbine blades and gas-turbine segments
- Impellers and guide wheels for aircraft engines
- Spinner discs used in the production of glass-wool insulation
- Femoral components made from cobalt alloys for knee replacements

The company also provides mould design, heat treatment, machining and surface finishing.

=== Cryogenic equipment ===
The company also develops and manufactures cryogenic equipment for gas-liquefaction systems and scientific and industrial applications. These include:

- Helium expansion turbines that provide cooling by expanding gas during the liquefaction process.
- Cryogenic compressors for compressing gases at low temperatures.
- Cryogenic pumps for transferring liquefied gases, including helium, nitrogen and argon.
