= PBS TJ150 =

Czech jet engine

TJ150
- Type: Jet aircraft engine
- National origin: Czech Republic
- Manufacturer: PBS Velká Bíteš

The PBS TJ150 is a Czech turbojet engine produced by PBS Velká Bíteš. The engine was developed for unmanned aerial vehicles, including target drones, as well as manned aircraft. With a thrust up to 1,500N, the PBS TJ150 is the second most powerful engine in the PBS engine range. The engine entered serial production in 2019.

== Design ==
The PBS TJ150 is a small single-shaft turbojet engine consisting of a radial compressor, radial and axial diffuser, annular combustion chamber, axial turbine and a fixed outlet nozzle. The engine has a built-in starter-generator to start and supply power to the deck network, and a separate oil system.

The PBS TJ150 engine was developed from PBS TJ100 engine utilizing the same outer diameter dimensions and engine weight but has 20% more power. One of the PBS TJ150 engine versions enables landing on salt water.

== Specifications ==
==== General characteristics ====
- Type: turbojet
- Length: 25.04 in (636 mm)
- Diameter: 10.71 in (272 mm)
- Dry weight: 37.70 lb (17.10 kg)

==== Components ====
- Compressor:

==== Performance ====
- Maximum thrust: 337 lbf (1,500 N)
- Thrust-to-weight ratio: 8.9:1
