= Barracuda-M =

American cruise missile developed by Anduril Industries

- Type: Subsonic cruise missile
- Place of origin: United States

Service history
- In service: 2024-present

Production history
- Manufacturer: Anduril Industries
- Developed from: Barracuda AAV
- Variants: Barracuda-100; Barracuda-250; Barracuda-500

Specifications
- Warhead: Conventional warhead
- Warhead weight: up to 100 lb (45 kg)
- Engine: turbojet
- Operational range: Barracuda-100 – 120 nmi (140 mi; 220 km); Barracuda-250 – 200 nmi (230 mi; 370 km); Barracuda-500 – 500 nmi (580 mi; 930 km)
- Maximum speed: Subsonic; ~Mach 0.74 about 567.7 mph (493.3 kn; 913.6 km/h)
- Launch platform: AH-64 Apache; AH-1Z Viper; F-35A/B/C; Strategic bombers F-15E/EX; F/A-18E/F; F-16; Ground-launched; Ship-launched; Rapid Dragon

Barracuda-M is a medium-range turbojet-powered cruise missile developed by American defence company Anduril Industries. Barracuda-M is the missile variant of the Barracuda AAV loitering munition. Anduril intends to pitch Barracuda to the United States Armed Forces as a low-cost 'hyper-scale production' alternative to existing systems, such as AGM-158C LRASM.

Barracuda-M is designed to be launched from a plethora of systems, including in-service fighter and multirole aircraft; such as the Lockheed Martin F-35 Lightning II, McDonnell Douglas F-15 Eagle, as well as strategic bombers and various helicopters. The missile is also capable of being launched from Boeing C-17 Globemaster III and Lockheed C-130 Hercules cargo aircraft via the Rapid Dragon missile system.

The price per unit of Barracuda is initially reported to be less than $200,000; a tenth of the cost of a Tomahawk missile. The expected price for the Taiwanese derivative of the Barracuda-500, developed by Taiwan's NCSIST and Anduril, was $216,000 as of 2025. In 2026, the Polish state-owned arms company PGZ has signed an agreement with Anduril Industries for the production of Barracuda-500M missiles in Poland.

Barracuda is said by Anduril to require 50% less time to produce, use 95% fewer tools, and 50% less parts than its current competitors.

== Variants ==
All Barracuda variants can withstand up to 5 g-forces and can work autonomously and collaboratively with other Barracuda missiles to act as decoys and conduct strike missions.

Barracuda-100

The Barracuda-100 variant would have a range of 120 nautical miles (222 km) and carry a 35lb (16kg) warhead. It can be launched from ground systems, Rapid Dragon module, or Boeing AH-64 Apache and Bell AH-1Z Viper helicopters.

Barracuda-250

The Barracuda-250 would be solely air launched from the internal weapons bay of an F-35, or externally from an F-15E, F-16 or F/A-18 while having the same payload as the Barracuda-100 and a range of 200 nautical miles (370 km).

Barracuda-500

The Barracuda-500 would be launched by air from F-15s, F/A-18s, F-16s, F-35s or bombers, would have a payload of 100lb (45kg) and a range of more than 500 nautical miles (926 km). The Barracuda-500 has been designated AGM-189.

== Operators ==
=== Future operators ===
Poland

Taiwan

United States

- United States Army: Containerized version of the Barracuda-500

=== Potential Operators ===
Ukraine

- Ukrainian Air Force
- Ukrainian Ground Forces
