= Dragon Cart =

Palletized airdrop missile deployment system

Dragon Cart missile deployment system
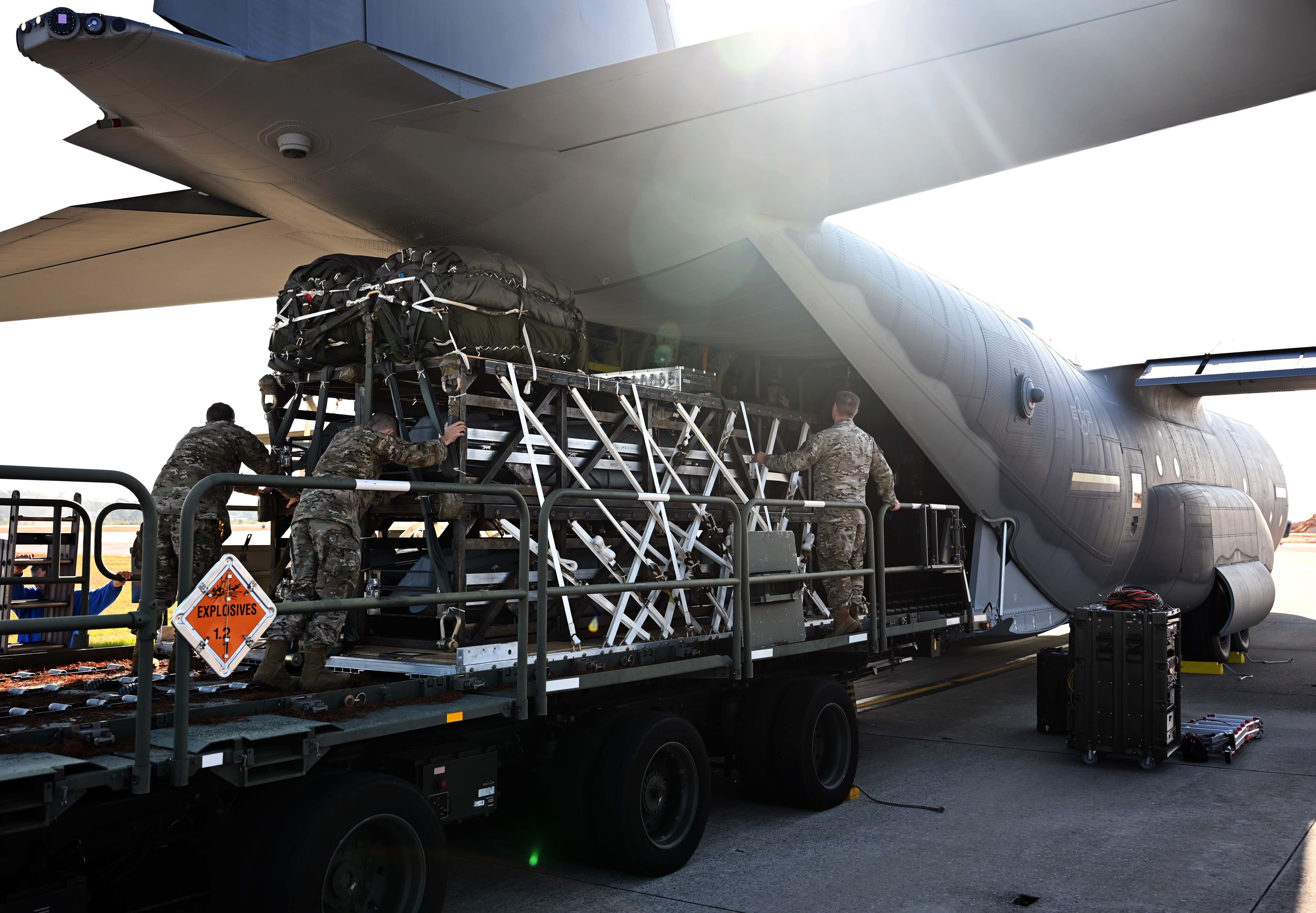
- A Dragon Cart module being loaded on a C-130 for airdrop
- Type: Palletized airdrop standoff missile launch system
- Place of origin: United States

Service history
- In service: 2021 (JASSM-ER successful test)
- Used by: United States Air Force

Production history
- Designer: US Air Force Research Lab SDPE group Air Force Futures
- Designed: 2020
- Manufacturer: Lockheed Martin Missiles and Fire Control; Systima Technologies; Safran Electronics & Defense
- Produced: 2022 (low production)
- Variants: C-130: 6 tube module (max 2); C-17: 9 tube module (max 5)

Specifications
- Length: 17 ft (520 cm) (approx.)
- Width: 8.4 ft (260 cm) for 6 and 9 tube configurations
- Crew: 4 (Airdrop cargo crew)
- Barrels: 4 to 9+ (configurable to cargo deck size)
- Effective firing range: JASSM-ER: > 575 mi (925 km); JASSM-XR: > 1,200 mi (1,900 km); LRASM (naval targets): > 500 mi (800 km)+ JDAM-ER: > 50 mi (80 km)
- Feed system: Vertical drop
- Main armament: AGM-158 variants (anti surface & anti naval)
- Payload capacity: 8,800 to 21,800 lb (4,000 to 9,900 kg)
- Launch platform: Pallet-airdrop capable aircraft: C-130, C-17 (confirmed compatibility)

Dragon Cart is a palletized and disposable weapons module which is airdropped in order to deploy flying munitions, typically cruise missiles, from unmodified cargo planes. First developed by the United States Air Force Research Laboratory and Lockheed under the name Rapid Dragon, the airdrop-rigged pallets, called "deployment boxes," provide a low cost method allowing unmodified cargo planes, such as C-130 or C-17 aircraft, to be temporarily repurposed as standoff bombers capable of mass launching any variant of long or short range AGM-158 JASSM cruise missiles against land or naval targets.

The size of the deployment boxes is configurable and ranges from 4 to 45 AGM-158B JASSM-ER (extended range) cruise missiles, which can strike targets at a range of 570 to 1,200 mi (925 to 1,900 km). Large numbers of JASSM-XR (extreme range) will become available in 2024.

The current version uses unmodified cargo aircraft while missile deployment requires no additional crew skills beyond those for airdrops of supplies or vehicles. The system can be thought of as a smart and disposable bomb bay in a box that includes an interface allowing targeting information that is gathered from allied units in the area to be fed to the munitions from a distant fire control center. The system has been successfully used with C-130 and C-17 cargo planes to strike both land and sea targets with armed and test version JASSM-ERs.

Future development will generalize the system beyond the AGM-158 missile family to include JDAM bombs, sea mines, drones, and other missile systems as well as integrating the launch system into use on other supporting cargo and non-cargo aircraft. Parallel to the initiative in 2026, the US Air Force has begun a five-year program called Family of Affordable Mass Missiles (FAMM) to stockpile twenty eight thousand compatible munitions with an allocated $12 billion. Performance-wise, the Air Force wishes to procure anti-surface missiles capable of 250 to 1,000 nautical mile ranges at Mach 0.7 speeds while able to receive mid-course navigation updates in GNSS-denied environments. In exchange for being vender agnostic with multiple entrants, the program aspires to keep costs around $100,000 per munition while giving each manufacturer an annual quota of 1,000-2,000 units to deliver. While individually less destructive and stealthy than JASSM, FAMM would be cheaper to procure in bulk and can be mixed with JASSM munitions for saturation attacks with the higher end missiles focused on priority targets.

== Overview ==
The AFRL and operational names for the project are derived from a tenth century Chinese volley-firing siege weapon, known as the Ji Long Che (疾龙车 "rapid dragon cart"), which could simultaneously launch large numbers of long range crossbow missiles from a safe distance. Similarly, the present-day Rapid Dragon launch system is intended to saturate a target's defenses from standoff weapon distances, where the launching aircraft is not threatened. It can be rapidly fielded, using existing fleets of airlift assets to offer the option of significant surges in mass attack missions at minimal cost and training. Strategically, it also allows the United States to rapidly provide strategic strike capability to any of its foreign military partners that already possess the commonplace capacity to air drop supplies from cargo planes. It also increases the amount of places that cruise missile-carrying aircraft can deploy from and complicates an adversary's attempts to cripple the operator's strike aircraft fleet by destroying their established airbases. While a B-52 Stratofortress requires a 10,000 ft (3,000 m) concrete runway to take off and land, a C-130 can operate from 3,000 ft (910 m) stretches of less developed surfaces. In addition to enhancing USAF capabilities, the Rapid Dragon concept enables other air forces without strategic bombers but which do operate transport aircraft to mass fire JASSMs.

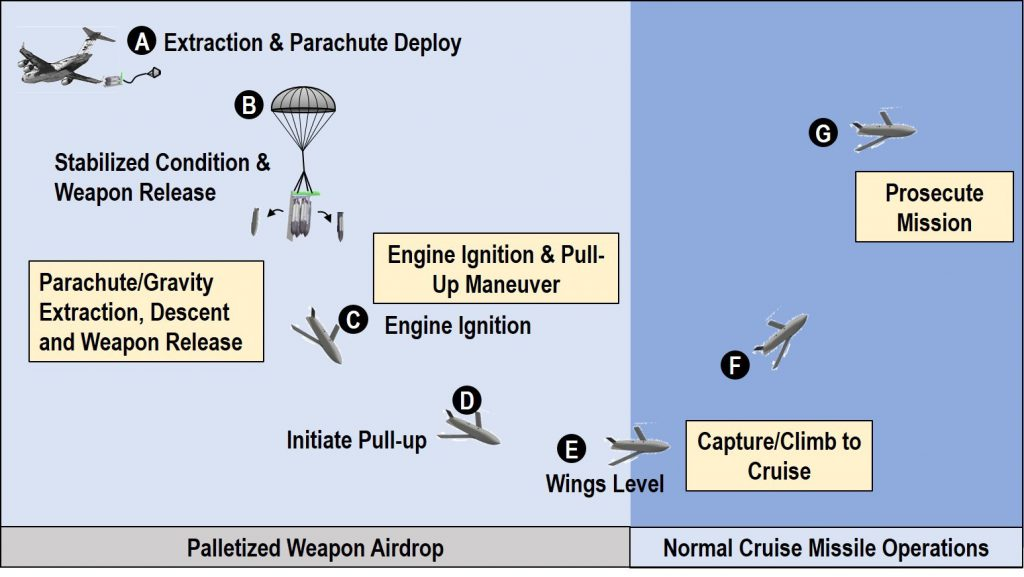
Rapid Dragon mission stages

Developed from 2020 to 2021 by a team of US Air Force development groups and industry partners, Rapid Dragon has all of its capabilities self-contained on its disposable drop pallet; allowing a standard military cargo plane to be used at any time as a standoff strategic bomber before reverting back to regular transport missions. For example, a C-130 could launch 12 JASSM cruise missiles from a safe distance of 620 to 1,180 mi (1,000 to 1,900 km) from target with the use of two Rapid Dragon pallets. The larger C-17 could accommodate 5 Rapid Dragon pallets, each carrying 9 missiles for a mission, with a total payload of 45 missiles with 1,100 lb (500 kg) warheads. In a test over the Gulf of Mexico on December 16, 2021, an armed Rapid Dragon received target data from a distant command and control node in flight, used the data to target its armed JASSM, was airdropped from the aircraft, and successfully deployed its payloads with the live missile destroying its naval target. The other 3 bays of the 4-pack palette had ballast rounds with the same shape and weight in order to test the system's method of preventing missile releases from conflicting with each other. To maintain consistent stability during drops, these non-munition ballast rounds will continue to be used for missions requiring fewer missiles than the module's full capacity. The cargo plane, an MC-130J, was flown by an Air Force Special Operations Command operational flight crew and carried a 4-pack version of the Rapid Dragon missile module. The airdrop crew treated the load as a standard supply drop with the pallet's Rapid Dragon's control unit autonomously receiving command and control data to be used for programming the JASSM's targeting data.

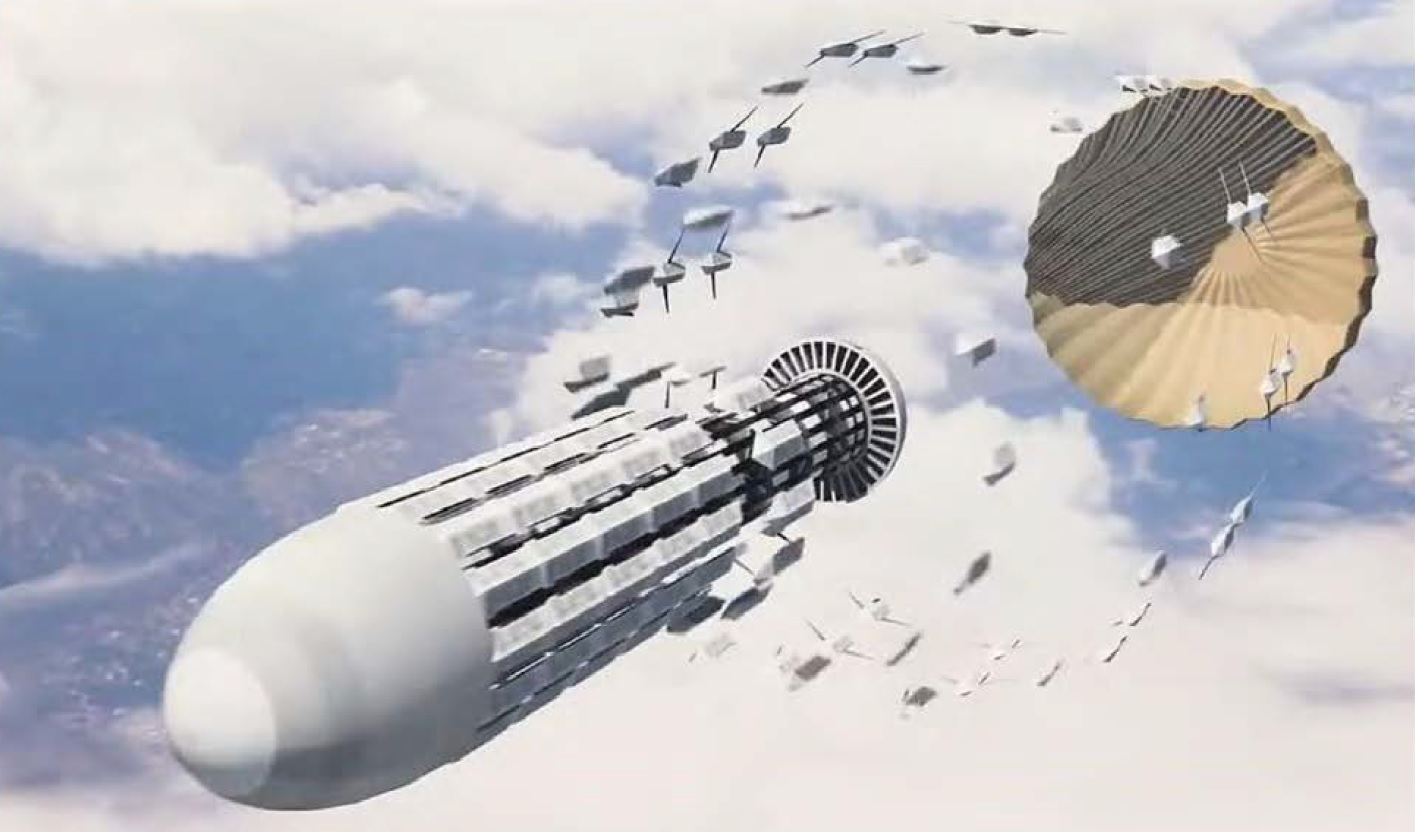
Mass launch of a swarm of miniature decoys to accompany a Rapid Dragon airdrop (Air Force Research Laboratory concept illustration)

Based on prior conflicts, it is known that even modern air defense systems struggle with defending against cruise missile barrages as seen with the 2018 Riyadh missile strike during the Saudi Arabian–led intervention in Yemen as well as the 2018 missile strikes against Syria during the American-led intervention in the Syrian civil war. Due to the vulnerability of sophisticated air defense systems such as S-300 and S-400 to mass attacks from low flying cruise missiles, it is thought that Rapid Dragon is well suited for swarm tactics missions to suppress enemy air defenses with large numbers of JASSM-ER optionally accompanied by swarms of miniature spoofing decoy drones released from a second airdrop module.

The US Air Force intends to continue live tests with C-17s, AGM-158C Long Range Anti Ship (LRASM), and 1,200 mi (1,900 km) range AGM-158D JASSM-XR which became available in low production numbers in 2021. The Air Force's Strategic Development Planning and Experimentation (SDPE) group is also researching integration of Boeing's lower cost but shorter range (50 mi or 80 km) JDAM-ER bombs, and is working with Raytheon to support Rapid Dragon launch of ADM-160 MALD decoys. In November 2022, the first European-theater, live-fire demonstration of a Joint Air-to-Surface Standoff Missile was performed with a MC-130J at Andøya Space test range in Norway with support from Polish, Norwegian, Romanian, and British military partners for the Atreus 2022 military exercise.

Some of the cruise missiles compatible with Rapid Dragon can carry nuclear warheads. This could change how the terms of arms limitation treaties will need to be written or re-written. Stipulations based on the number of launch vehicles would no longer be effective if any cargo aircraft with a suitable bay could be converted into one.

== Historical context ==
- Airdrops of supplies have been commonplace since World War II; however, Rapid Dragon differs from modern palletized airdrops in that the parachute is rigged to ensure the missile cargo is oriented nose-down. As each missile is released in series, it falls out of its barrel-like cell, unfolds its wings alongside its tail, ignites the engine to generate thrust, and performs a pull-up maneuver before proceeding to its target.
- Fixed-wing cargo aircraft have been used in an offensive role since before the Second World War, with the Bombing of Guernica during the Spanish Civil War in 1937 and the Bombing of Warsaw in 1940 through German Ju-52 transport planes used as auxiliary bombers. The US started to use cargo planes as bombers during the Vietnam War when C-130s were used to drop BLU-82 bombs. Despite losses in Vietnam due to ground fire, the technique continued to be used such as in the 1991 Iraq War and in Afghanistan with larger GBU-43/B MOAB bombs. Due to the extended range of its missiles, Rapid Dragon allows use of cargo planes as arsenal ships facing much more heavily contested target airspaces with the aircraft staying safely outside the kill ranges of hostile air defenses. Likewise, the theoretical capability of using cargo planes to launch missiles has been around since the 1970s. In 1974, the US demonstrated the feasibility of launching an ICBM from practically anywhere when it test fired a 57 ft (17.4 m), 88,000 lb (40,000 kg) LGM-30 Minuteman airdropped from a C-5A Galaxy. Likewise, the US military continues to use similar techniques for launching simulated ballistic missiles from C-17s for air defense system tests.
- In the 1980s when the B-1 bomber faced the possibility of cancelation, a lower cost alternative to the B-1 bomber known as the Cruise Missile Carrier Aircraft (CMCA) was designed. It consisted of reconfiguring Boeing 747-200 cargo airframes as special-purpose cruise missile launchers with a capacity of 50 to 100 AGM-86 ALCM missiles. Like the Rapid Dragon, missiles were released rapidly from the rear of the aircraft (in this case, via a rotary launcher ejecting missiles out the side of the tail fuselage) and were dynamically targeted by an onboard control system. While the CMCA was never fully developed with the revival of the B-1B bomber, Rapid Dragon leverages the CMCA's thematic concepts of adapting existing aircraft to become standoff arsenal ships in support of cost-cutting purposes. By adapting the concept to a "roll on, roll off" capability, Rapid Dragon can be rapidly used to convert virtually any of the numerous cargo aircraft capable of airdropping pallets from a rear ramp that are operated by the US and its allies into a standoff strike bomber.
- The concept of loading and launching palletized missiles from American cargo aircraft was first explored by graduate students in preliminary concept studies at the Air Force Institute of Technology in 2003 with explored launch systems including cruise missiles deployed from the aft of the aircraft atop of parachuted pallet trays, ejected rearwards from rotary launchers, or ejected rearwards from spring-loaded launchers. Later in the 2010s, with the emergence of near-peer adversaries exploring anti-access area denial tactics to counter the United States military's aerial and naval power projection capabilities, other research institutions such as the RAND Corporation began exploring concepts that may extend standoff bombing capabilities for the US military while balancing Congressional budgetary restraints.
- By the 2020s, other countries have begun studying similar palletized missile launch concepts with Japan's Ministry of Defense performing studies on adapting Kawasaki C-2 aircraft to launch modified Type 12 missiles under the Cargo Missile Launch System (CMLS) or「輸送機用誘導弾発射システム」(Yusō-ki-yō Yūdō-dan Hassha Shisutemu) study. Meanwhile, European companies like Airbus and MDBA are promoting concepts for adapting the Airbus A400M Atlas for palletized launches of up to 12 Taurus KEPD 350 cruise missiles via a system called the Generic Airdropped Munition Pallet (GAMP). Likewise, Embraer teamed up with Anduril Industries to integrate palletized Barracuda-M missile payloads onto the former's C-390 aircraft.
- Similar concepts for parachuting pallets from cargo aircraft to launch rockets have independently been proposed in the civilian aerospace sector by a cross-industrial team sponsored by the Japanese Ministry of Economy, Trade and Industry in 2011 at the 25th AIAA/USU Conference on Small Satellites to facilitate the deployment of satellites weighing 100-200 kilograms to Low Earth orbit without the need for a dedicated spaceport. Follow-up design research was published in 2013 and 2015 at the 27th and 29th AIAA/USU Conferences on Small Satellites respectively. These design proposals have also been preceded and paralleled with other related Air-launch-to-orbit concepts that launch spacecraft deployed either from cargo ramps or external mounts.
- Rapid Dragon adds standoff range and modularity to prior offensive airdrop approaches. This enables vulnerable but large-capacity cargo planes to be used at much greater distances from the target; allowing for the greater flexibility and lower cost of temporarily repurposing unmodified cargo planes as standoff cruise missile bombers. Current research efforts include enhancing Rapid Dragon to support missions such as precision aerial mine laying alongside mass drone dispersal. Similar work in adapting cargo planes for such missions has also been conducted under DARPA with the experimental Dynetics X-61 Gremlins to prove the feasibility of deploying and retrieving unmanned aerial vehicles from the back of a C-130 aircraft with an integrated launch-and-retrieval crane.
