= PBS TJ80-120 =

Czech turbojet aircraft engine

TJ80-120
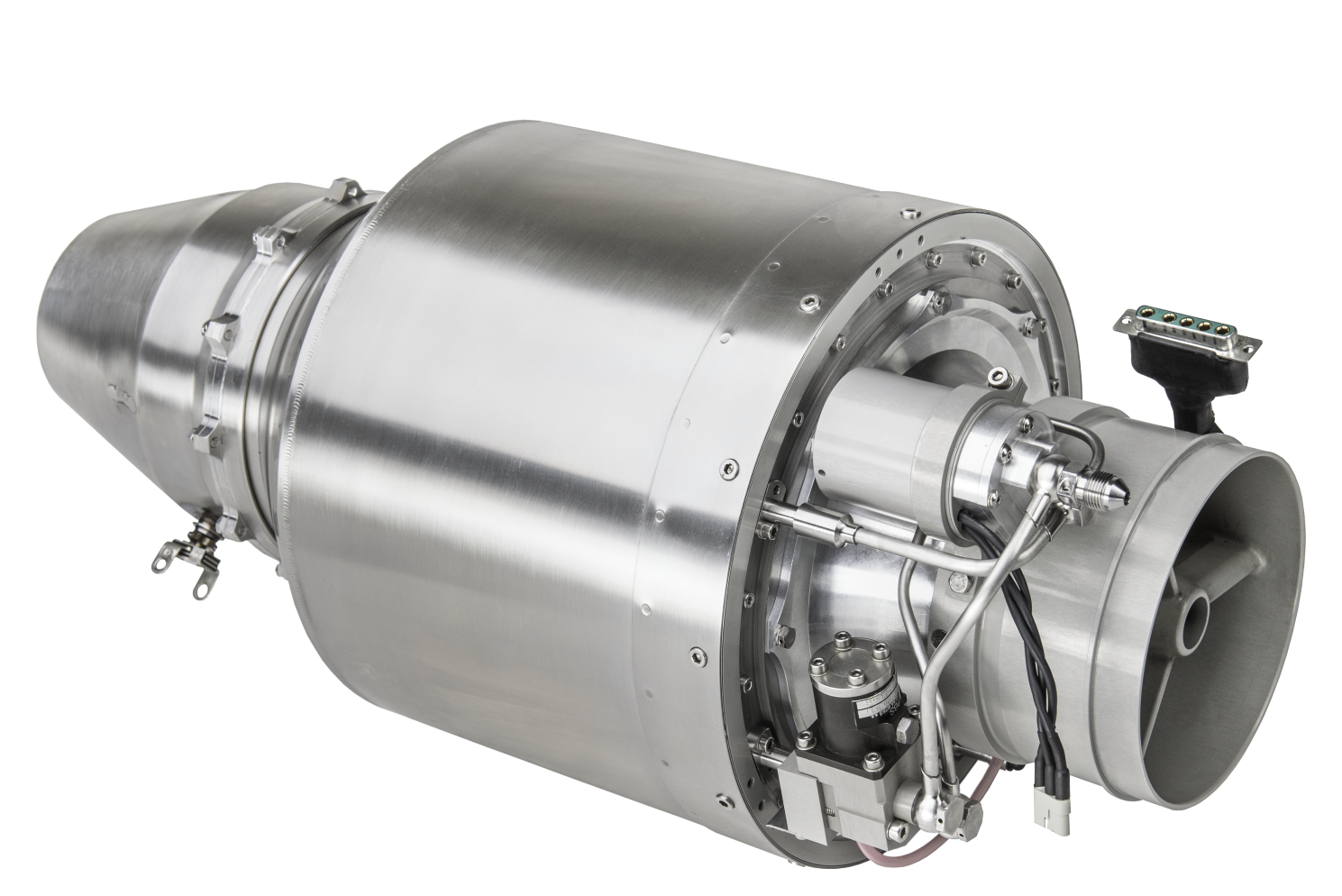
- Type: Turbojet
- National origin: Czech Republic
- Manufacturer: PBS Velká Bíteš
- First run: 2021

The PBS TJ80-120 is a small subsonic turbojet engine produced by a Czech turbine engine manufacturer PBS Velká Bíteš.

== Development ==
The engine has been developed for unmanned aerial vehicles, including target drones, remote carriers, unmanned combat systems and disposable applications with weight ranging from 330-551 lb (150-250 kg). The PBS TJ80-120 has the best thrust-to-weight ratio among gas turbine engines with thrust more than 1,150 N. With a thrust 269 lbf (1,200 N) and weight 28.21 lb (12.8 kg) including the accessories, the thrust-to-weight ratio is currently 9.53.

== Design ==
The PBS TJ80-120 is a small single-shaft turbojet engine with a built-in brushless starter generator including the ECU. The engine is capable of ground and in-flight restart under 7 seconds and a windmill starting. The engine offers a possibility of salt water recovery.

== Specifications ==
Data from Manufacturer

==== General characteristics ====
- Type: turbojet
- Length: 636 mm (25.0 in)
- Diameter: 235 mm (9.3 in)
- Dry weight: 12.8 kg (28.2 lb)

==== Components ====
- Compressor: axial
- Oil system: fuel mixed with oil

==== Performance ====
- Maximum thrust: 1,200 N (270 lbf)
- Specific fuel consumption: 34.72 g/(kN⋅s) (1.226 lb/(lbf⋅h))
- Thrust-to-weight ratio: 9.6:1
