= Chinese siege weapons =

Siege tower

This is an overview of Chinese siege weapons.

== Siege ladders ==
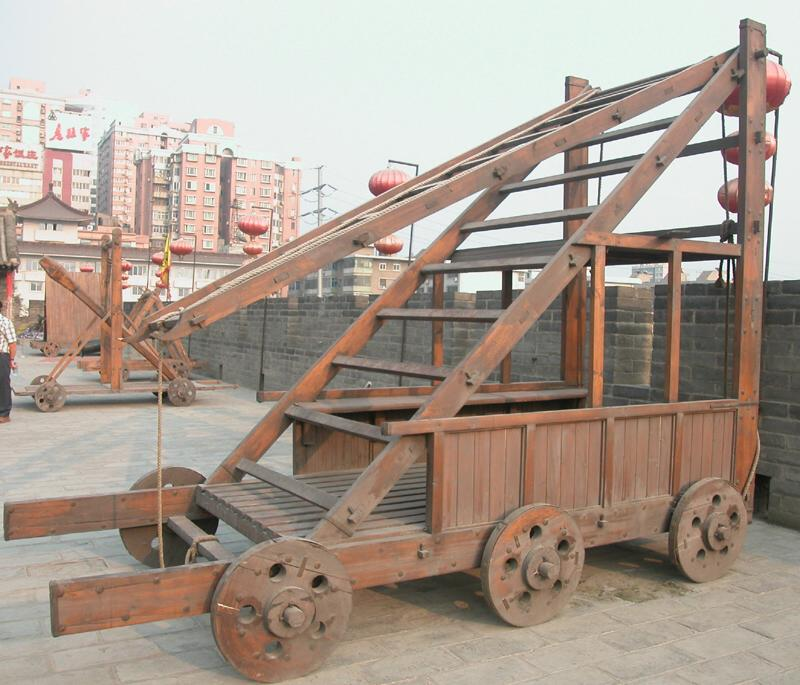
Modern reconstruction of a cloud ladder

Siege ladders were used starting from the Warring States period. A hinged folding ladder known as the "cloud ladder" was quite prominent. Originally it used a counterweight to unfold once within reach of the enemy walls, but the contraption proved to be too vulnerable, and switched to a simple pulling mechanism during the Song dynasty. The newer version had men pull on ropes from behind with the aid of a long pole to move the top ladder into position. Some ladders had a compartment built below it to house soldiers who provided covering fire with crossbows.

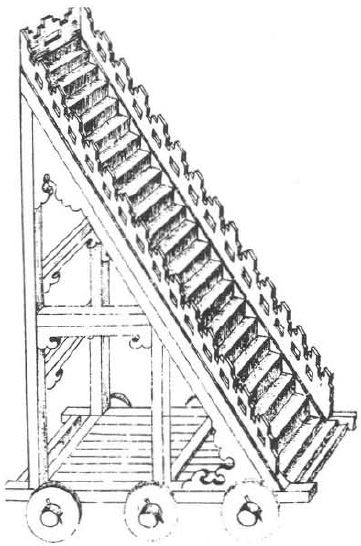
A sky cart

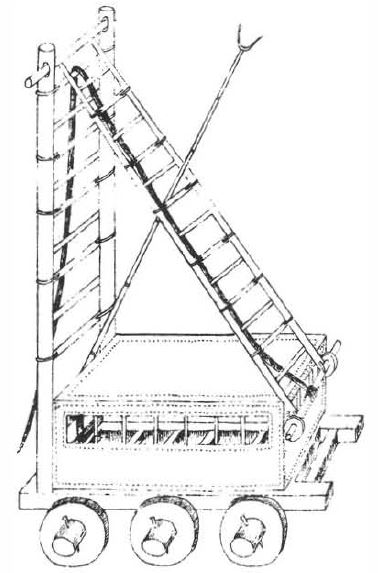
A scaling ladder

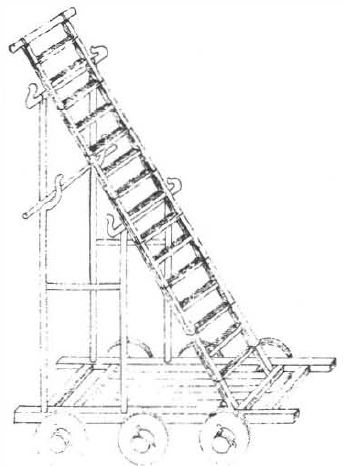
A rake cart

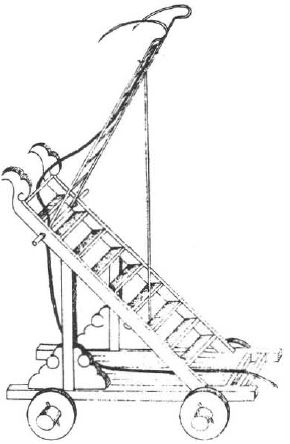
A double hook cart

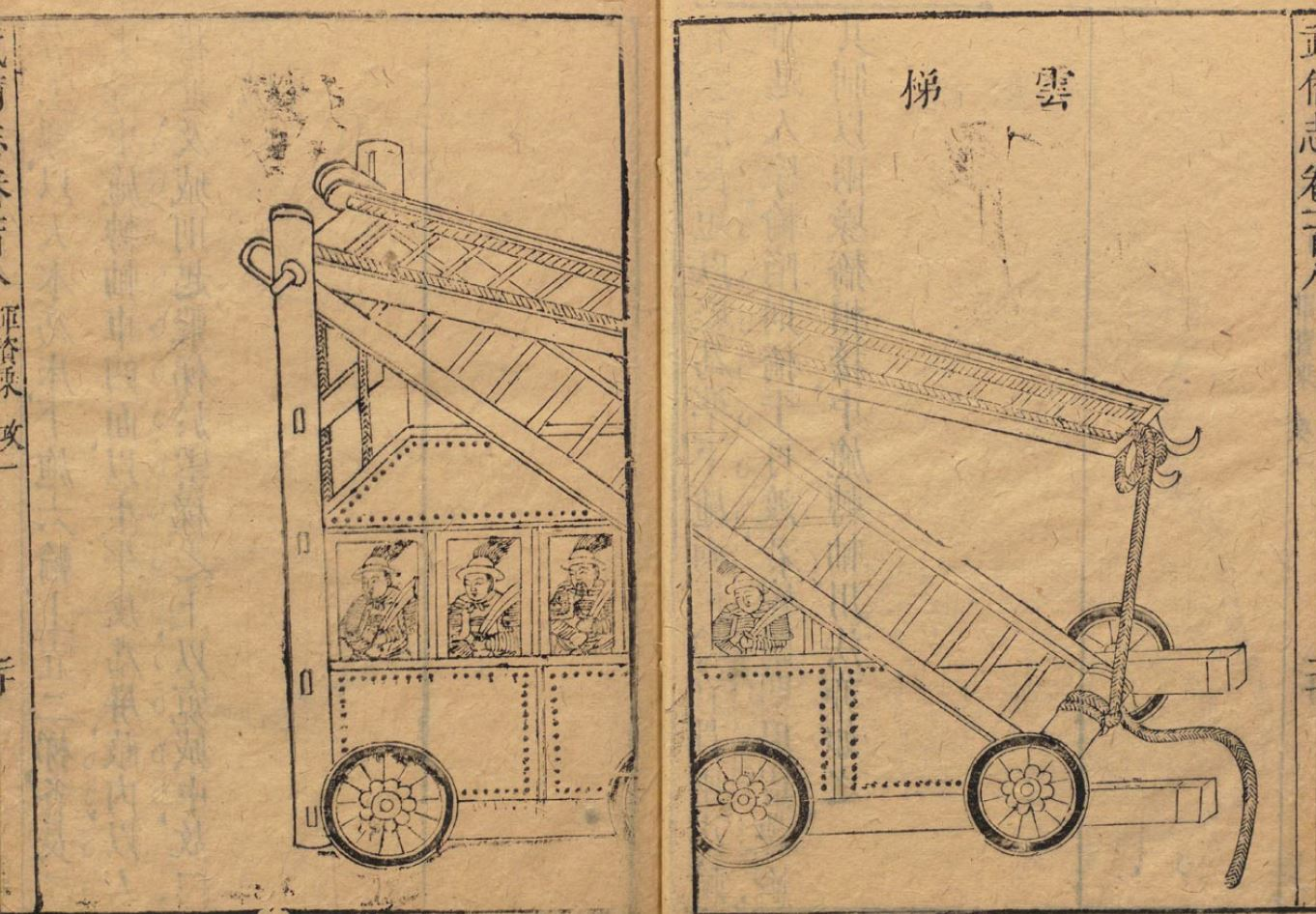
Cloud ladder

Mobile moat crossing bridge

== Hook carts ==
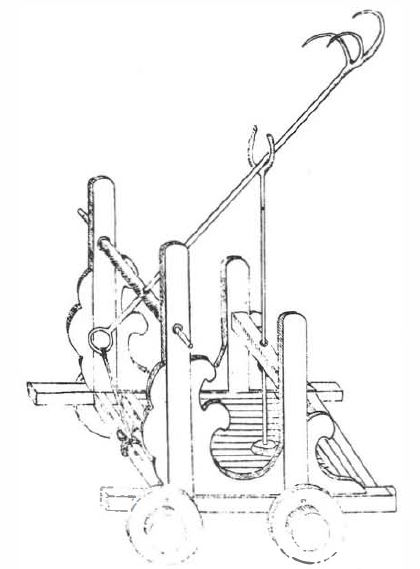
A fork cart

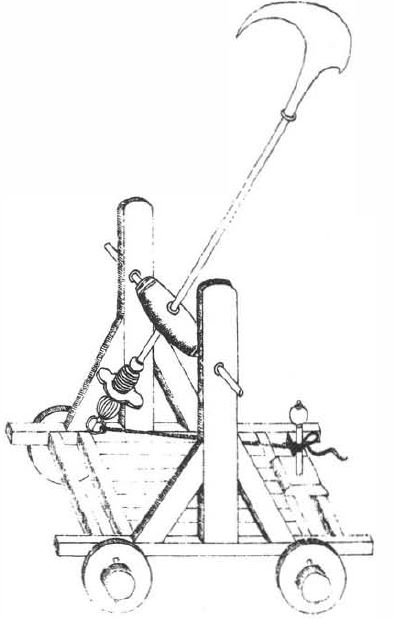
A hungry falcon cart

The hook carts join the fray and the nine oxen turn and heave, bellowing like thunder, and furiously smash the towers and overturn the parapets... Then the flying ladders, movable overlooks, cloud pavilions and the buildings in the void are rolled forward into the breaches so that the attackers can swarm into the city.

— Chen Lin

Hook carts such as the fork and falcon carts were used to pull down parapets and the top part of walls to make it easier for ladders to access. Once attached, 50 to 100 men took hold of a rope and pulled until the wall came down. They were used as early as the Three Kingdoms period, as mentioned by Chen Lin:

== Assault cover ==
Various protective covers were used during a siege. The most typical were mobile screens and assault wagons. More complex contraptions such as plaited galleries were used for mining and filling in moats.

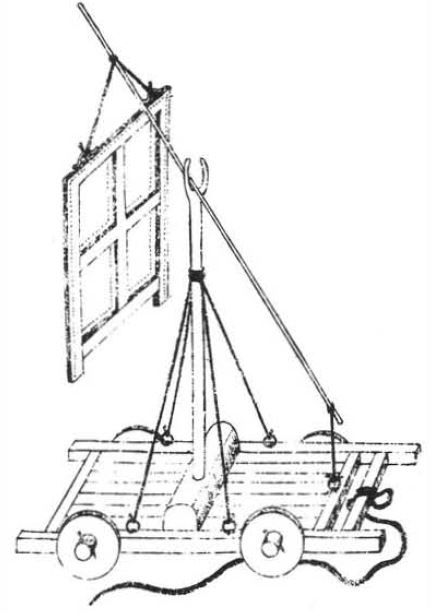
A wooden screen

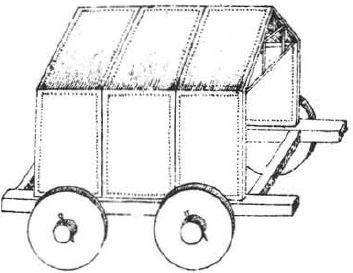
Assault cover

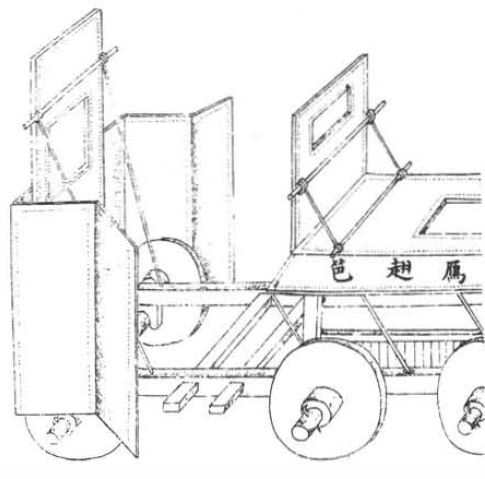
Head cart

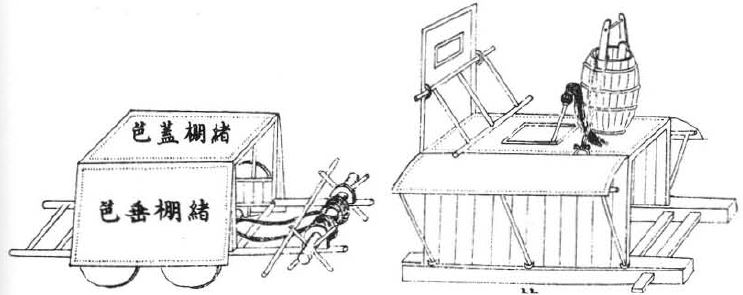
Plated gallery

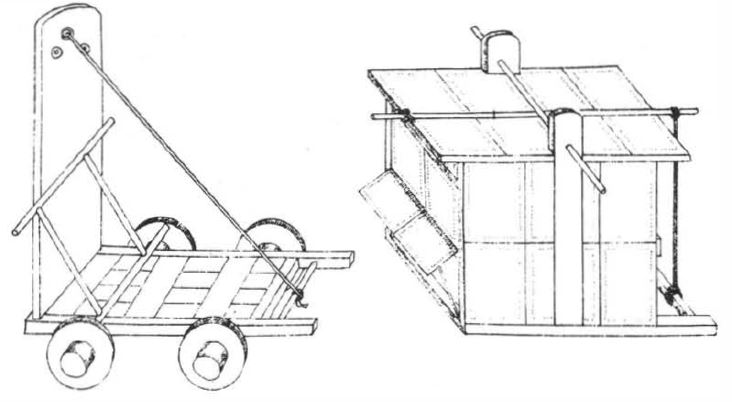
Wagon and cart for filling in moats

== Observation tower ==
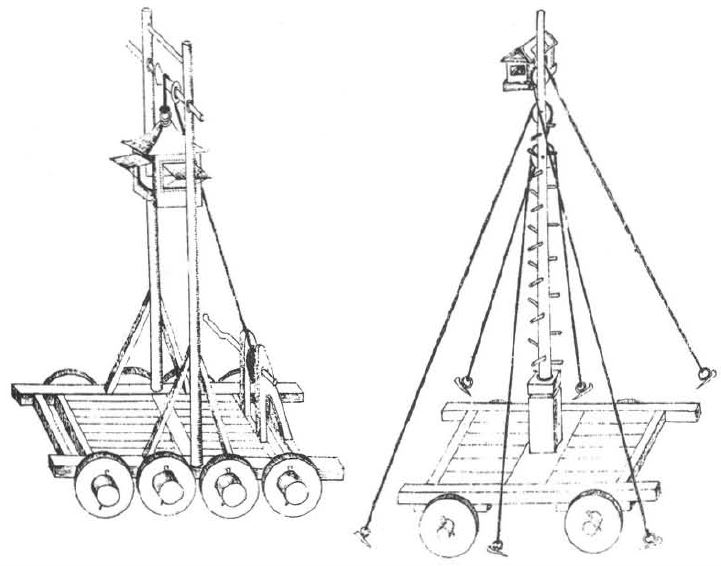
Nest and watchtower carts.

Static observation towers such as the nest and watchtower carts were used to see into the city. Static towers were also used in close proximity to enemy walls to rain down projectiles on the defenders.

== Mobile siege tower ==
Mobile siege towers have been used in China since the 6th century BC. They were often called overlook carts, assault carts, or some combination of the two. A typical mobile siege tower was five stories tall mounted on axles with two wheels on each side. The tower was pushed forward by men on the lowest storey or pulled by horses and oxen.

The king of Wu mentioned it in a passage comparing land armies to the navy.

These days in training we use the (same) tactics of land armies for the best effect. Thus big wing ships correspond to the army's heavy chariots, small wing ships to their light chariots, stomach strikers to battering rams, castled ships to mobile assault towers and bridge ships to the light cavalry.

— King of Wu (514 – 496 BC)

During the Tang dynasty, in the 783 siege of Fengtian, an assault cart 10 m (33 ft) tall was constructed, protected by layers of cowhide and equipped with leather bags of water to douse fires. It was used in an attempt to breach the city. The defenders managed to dig a trench in front of the siege engine, which tipped it over, and they burnt it and had it destroyed.

In 1132, the Jurchen Jin dynasty constructed assault carts called "sky bridges" during the Siege of De'an, but failed to reach the enemy walls due to the use of long beams to push them away.

The last recorded use of assault carts was in 1851 by the Taiping rebels to besiege Guilin after their first attempt with ladders failed. They mounted cannons on it to bombard the Qing soldiers manning the walls, but the tower was destroyed by a combination of burning oil and long poles wrapped in incendiary material at the ends.

== Ram ==
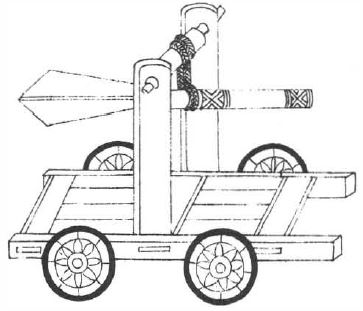
Iron plated ram

The Chinese ram used an iron-plated head. After the introduction of gunpowder it added a cannon as well.

== Traction trebuchet ==
The traction trebuchet, also referred to as a mangonel in some sources, is an artillery weapon which derives from manpower its motive force, and was probably used by the Mohists starting from the 4th century BC. Descriptions of it can be found in the Mojing (compiled in the 4th century BC). It consisted of an arm and sling mounted on a wooden frame, sometimes with wheels. Attached to one end of the arm were pulling ropes for men to power the weapon. In Chapter 14 of the Mojing, the traction trebuchet is described hurling hollowed out logs filled with burning charcoal at enemy troops. Trebuchets mounted on wheels were said to have needed 200 men to pull each of them.

By the Qin and Han dynasties, traction trebuchets were a common weapon used in both attack and defense. Later on in 617 Li Mi (Sui dynasty) constructed 300 trebuchets for his assault on Luoyang, in 621 Li Shimin did the same at Luoyang, and onward into the Song dynasty when in 1161, trebuchets operated by Song dynasty soldiers fired bombs of lime and sulphur against the ships of the Jin dynasty navy during the Battle of Caishi.

"Whirlwind" and "four footed" trebuchets appeared during the Tang dynasty. The whirlwind trebuchet used a single vertical pole which could be rotated 360 degrees for increased versatility at the cost of projectile strength. The four footed trebuchets were essentially the same as the previous Warring States weapons, differentiated from the whirlwinds by specifying its stability and larger size.

As defensive weapons, traction trebuchets were positioned behind city walls and guided by an "artillery observer" on the walls. Range was determined by the strength and number of men pulling. Increasing and decreasing range meant adding and removing men from the pulling ropes.

The traction trebuchet continued to be used until the counterweight trebuchet was introduced in 1272 during the Mongol conquest of the Song dynasty.

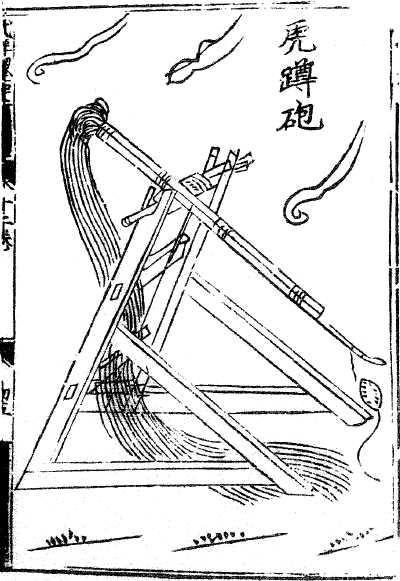
A crouching tiger trebuchet

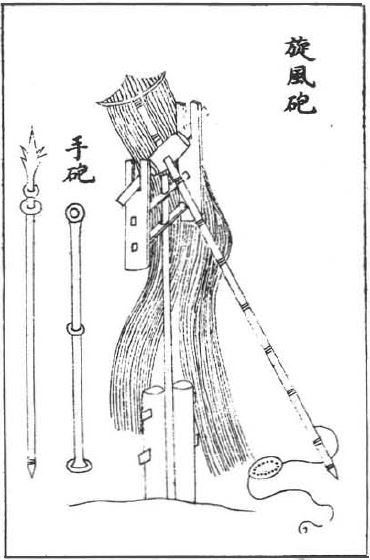
A whirlwind trebuchet

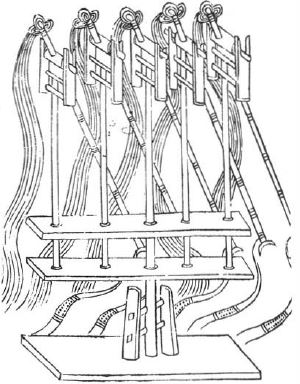
Five whirlwind trebuchets

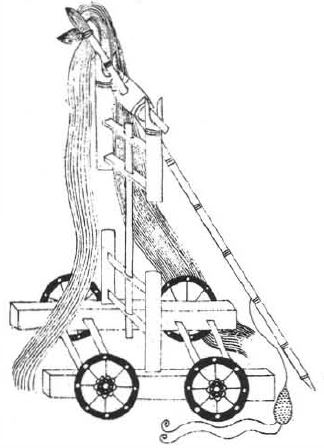
A wheeled trebuchet

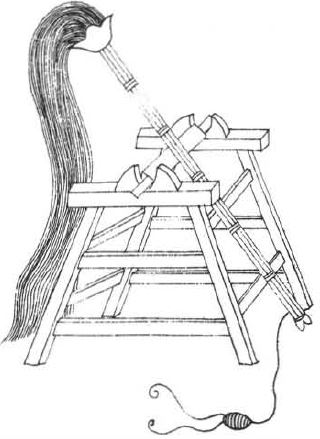
A four footed seven component trebuchet

=== Wheel catapult ===
A military engineer of the Three Kingdoms period, Ma Jun, devised a device which threw large stones using a wheel. This device consisted of a drum wheel attached with a curved knife. When rotated, the stones which hung on the wheel would be cut loose by the knife and launched. It is not clear how well this device worked in practice. Successful tests with roof tiles instead of stones are mentioned, but according to Liang Jieming, this contraption never made it past the testing phase and could not have been possible with the available technology at the time.

== Counterweight trebuchet ==
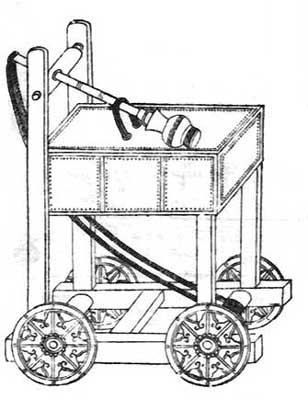
A wheeled counterweight trebuchet.

The introduction of the counterweight trebuchet in China is usually attributed to Muslim engineers during the Battle of Xiangyang in 1273, but it is possible that it was independently invented earlier in 1232 by the Jurchen Jin commander Qiang Shen. Qiang Shen invented a device called the "Arresting Trebuchet" which only needed a few men to work it, and could hurl great stones more than a hundred paces, further than even the strongest traction trebuchet. However no details on the construction of the machine are given. Qiang died the following year and no further references to the Arresting Trebuchet appear. Even earlier, a Song officer, Wei Sheng, had invented a trebuchet in 1176 that could hurl stones and gunpowder projectiles some 200 paces.

Qiang Shen furthermore invented a trebuchet called the 'Arresting Trebuchct' [E Pao], which was used to prevent [the enemy] from overrunning [his positions]. Only a few men were needed to work it, yet (with this engine] great stones could be hurled more than 100 paces, and there was no target which it did not hit right in the middle.

— History of Jin

The counterweight trebuchet, known as the Muslim trebuchet (or Huihui Pao) in China, replaced the traction version after its introduction in the late 13th century. Its greater range was however, somewhat countered by the fact that it had to be constructed at the site of the siege unlike traction trebuchets, which were easier to take apart and put back together again where necessary.

The counterweight trebuchet remained in use in China for roughly two centuries, at which point it was well on its way to obsolescence.

Weapon	Crew	Projectile weight: kilograms (pounds)	Range: meters (feet)
Whirlwind trebuchet	50	1.8 kg (4.0 lb)	78 m (256 ft)
Crouching tiger trebuchet	70	7.25 kg (16.0 lb)	78 m (256 ft)
Four footed (one arm) trebuchet	40	1.1 kg (2.4 lb)	78 m (256 ft)
Four footed (two arm) trebuchet	100	11.3 kg (25 lb)	120 m (390 ft)
Four footed (five arm) trebuchet	157	44.5 kg (98 lb)	78 m (256 ft)
Four footed (seven arm) trebuchet	250	56.7 kg (125 lb)	78 m (256 ft)
Counterweight trebuchet	?	~86 kg (190 lb)	200–275 m (656–902 ft)

== Mounted crossbow ==
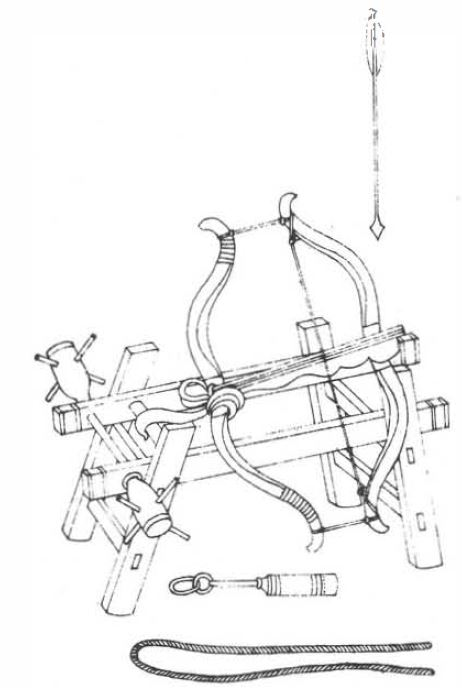
A double bed crossbow

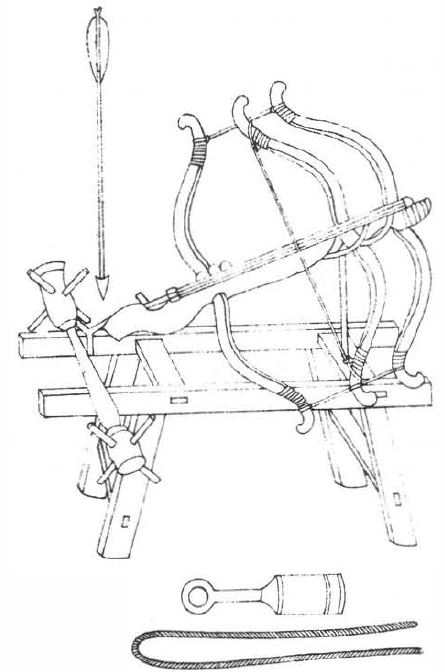
A triple bed crossbow

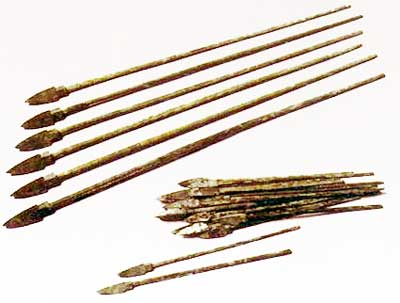
Large and small Qin crossbow bolts

Large crossbows called "bed crossbows" were mounted on rectangular frameworks, often wheeled. Bowstaves were also sometimes combined to increase tension and initial velocity of the bolt.

=== Bed crossbow ===
Large mounted crossbows known as "bed crossbows" were used as early as the Warring States period. Mozi described them as defensive weapons placed on top of the battlements. The Mohist siege crossbow was described as humongous device with frameworks taller than a man and shooting arrows with cords attached so that they could be pulled back. By the Han dynasty, crossbows were used as mobile field artillery and known as "Military Strong Carts". Around the 5th century AD, multiple bows were combined to increase draw weight and length, thus creating the double and triple bow crossbows. Tang versions of this weapon are stated to have obtained a range of 1,060 m (1,160 yd), which is supported by Ata-Malik Juvayni's description of similar weapons constructed by Chinese engineers for the Mongols in 1256 AD.

According to Juvayni, Hulagu Khan brought with him 3,000 giant crossbows from China, for the siege of Nishapur, and a team of Chinese technicians to work a great 'ox bow' shooting large bolts a distance of 2,500 paces, which was used at the siege of Maymun Diz. Hamdallah Mustawfi also describes the same events and gives a range of half a parasang for the arrows, which is a bit less than the figure given by Juvayni. According to the Wujing Zongyao, these weapons had a range of 450 m (490 yd) while other Song sources give ranges of more than double or even triple that. However according to Stephen G. Haw, these distances may have been reached with the assistance of rockets rather than solely the propulsion power of the bow. Constructing these weapons, especially the casting of the large triggers, and their operation required the highest order of technical expertise available at the time. They were primarily used from the 8th to 11th century AD. The bed crossbow has been compared with the ballista elephant that can be seen on the bas-relief of the 13th century Bayon in Cambodia.

Joseph Needham on the range of the triple-bow crossbow:

This range seems credible only with difficulty, yet strangely enough there is a confirmation of it from a Persian source, namely the historian 'Alā'al-Dīn al-Juwainī, who wrote of what happened when one of the almost impregnable castles of the Assassins was taken by Hulagu Khan. Here, in 1256, the Chinese arcuballistae shot their projectiles 2500 (Arab) paces 1,000 m (3,300 ft)) from a position on the top of some mountain... His actual words are: "and a kamān-i-gāu which had been constructed by Cathayan craftsmen, and which had a range of 2500 paces, was brought to bear on those fools, when no other remedy remained, and of the devil-like Heretics many soldiers were burnt by those meteoric shots". The castle in question was not Alamūt itself, but Maimūn-Diz, also in the Elburz range, and it was the strongest military base of the Assassins.

— Joseph Needham

=== Multiple bolt crossbow ===
The multiple bolt crossbow appeared around the late 4th century BC. A passage dated to 320 BC states that it was mounted on a three-wheeled carriage and stationed on the ramparts. The crossbow was drawn using a treadle and shot 3 m (9.8 ft) long arrows. Other drawing mechanisms such as winches and oxen were also used. Later on pedal release triggers were also used. Although this weapon was able to discharge multiple bolts, it was at the cost of reduced accuracy. It had a maximum range of 460 m (1,510 ft).

When Qin Shi Huang's magicians failed to get in touch with "spirits and immortals of the marvellous islands of the Eastern Sea", they excused themselves by saying large monsters blocked their way. Qin Shi Huang personally went out with a multiple bolt crossbow to see these monsters for himself. He found no monsters but killed a big fish.

In 99 BC, they were used as field artillery against attacking nomadic cavalry.

In 759 AD, Li Quan described a type of multiple bolt crossbow capable of destroying ramparts and city towers:

The arcuballista is a crossbow of a strength of 12 dan, mounted on a wheeled frame. A winch cable pulls on an iron hook; when the winch is turned round until the string catches on the trigger the crossbow is drawn. On the upper surface of the stock there are seven grooves, the centre carrying the largest arrow. This has a point 275 cm (108 in) long and 125 cm (49 in) round, with iron tail fins 125 cm (49 in) round, and a total length of 91.5 cm (36.0 in). To left and right there are three arrows each steadily decreasing in size, all shot forth when the trigger is pulled. Within 700 paces (525 m (1,722 ft)) whatever is hit will collapse, even solid things like ramparts and city towers."

— Li Quan

In 950 AD, Tao Gu described multiple crossbows connected by a single trigger:

The soldiers at the headquarters of the Xuan Wu army were exceedingly brave. They had crossbow catapults such that when one trigger was released, as many as 12 connected triggers would all go off simultaneously. They used large bolts like strings of pearls, and the range was very great. The Jin people were thoroughly frightened by these machines. Literary writers called them Ji Long Che (Rapid Dragon Carts; 疾龙车).

— Tao Gu

The weapon was considered obsolete by 1530.

Handheld bows
Weapon	Shots per minute	Range: meters (feet)
Chinese composite bow		150 m (490 ft)
Manchu bow		180–230 m (590–750 ft)
Chinese crossbow		170–450 m (560–1,480 ft)
Cavalry crossbow		150–300 m (490–980 ft)
Repeating crossbow	28–48	73–180 m (240–591 ft)
Double shot repeating crossbow	56–96	73–180 m (240–591 ft)

Siege crossbows
Weapon	Crew	Shots per minute	Range: meters (feet)
Mounted multi-bolt		6–12	365–460 m (1,198–1,509 ft)
Mounted single-bow			250–500 m (820–1,640 ft)
Mounted double-bow	4–7		350–520 m (1,150–1,710 ft)
Mounted triple-bow	20–30		1,060 m (3,480 ft)

== Incendiaries ==
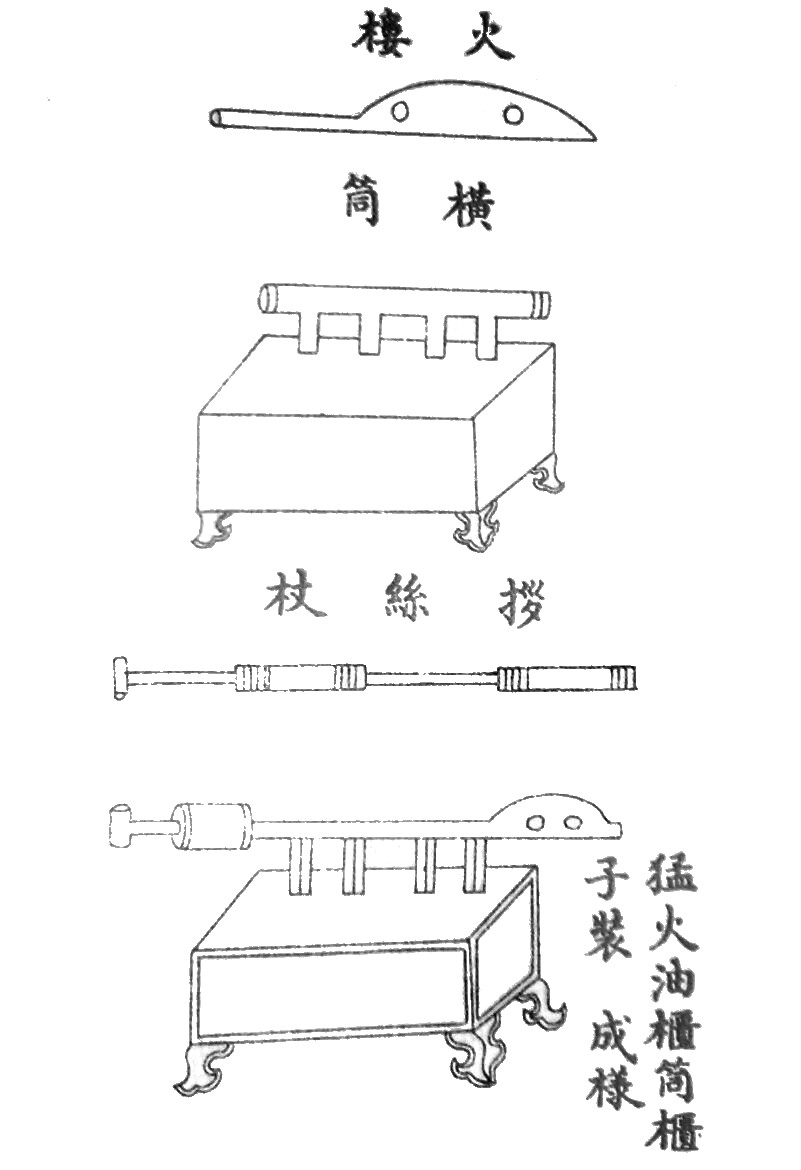
A Chinese flamethrower.

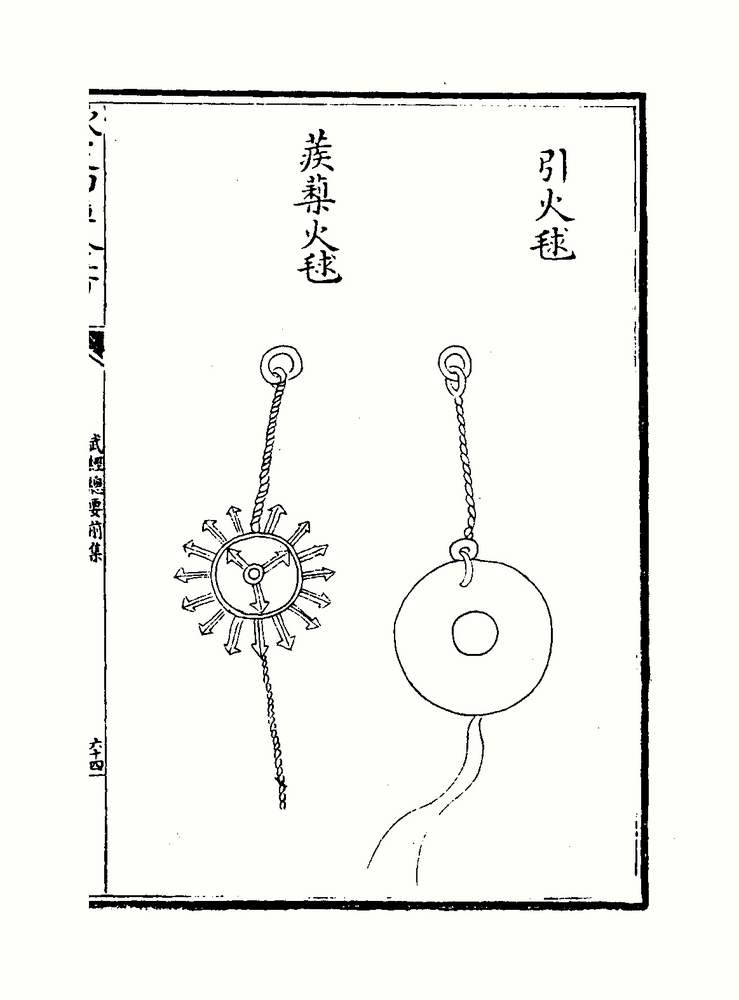
An 'igniter fire ball' and 'barbed fire ball' from the Wujing Zongyao.

Prior to the introduction of gunpowder, fire arrows used mineral oil and sulphur as incendiaries. They were most commonly used by defenders to burn enemy siege engines such as ladders and rams. They were also used to create fires in defending cities.

=== Gunpowder ===
Fire arrows switched to gunpowder incendiaries during the 10th century when gunpowder was weaponized. Production of gunpowder and fire arrows increased significantly in the 11th century as the court centralized the production process, constructing large gunpowder production facilities, hiring artisans, carpenters, and tanners for the military production complex in the capital of Kaifeng. One surviving source from c. 1023 lists all the artisans working in Kaifeng while another notes that in 1083 the imperial court sent 100,000 gunpowder arrows to one garrison and 250,000 to another. When the Jin captured Kaifeng in 1126 they captured 20,000 fire arrows for their arsenal.

Gunpowder was also used in fire balls launched by trebuchets. "Barbed fire balls" used a series of hooks to latch onto its target. A "molten metal bomb" also saw use during the Jin siege of Kaifeng in 1126. These were ceramic containers filled with molten metal kept in a mobile furnace.

Fire birds were a form of live delivery system for incendiaries. A walnut sized piece of burning tinder was tied to the birds' neck or leg. The idea was that once released, they would settle on the roofs of the enemy city, setting fire to the thatch.

The fire ox was another live delivery system. The ox was let loose with two spears attached to its sides and an incendiary tied to its behind. Later on a delayed-action bomb was also added.

Around 900, Greek fire entered the Chinese arsenal. The flamethrower consisted of a brass container and a horizontal pump connected to the gunpowder ignition chamber. When pushed, the pump caused burning petrol to squirt out. It was recommended that these devices be placed on the walls so that when rolls of straw were thrown at siege engines, they would be ignited by the petrol fire. Flamethrowers were also used at sea, sometimes disastrously. In 975, the commander of Southern Tang's navy panicked when enemy ships assaulted them with a barrage of arrows. In desperation, he projected petrol from flamethrowers at the enemy, but a sudden northern wind blew the flames in the opposite direction, setting his entire fleet ablaze. The commander jumped into the fire and died.

== Chemical warfare ==
Gas bombs consisting of gunpowder mixed with various poisons wrapped in hemp and moxa were used as defensive weapons. These were said to cause great discomfort in the enemy, having effects such as bleeding from the mouth and nose. Other than poison, lime and excrement were also used for their noxious and blinding properties.

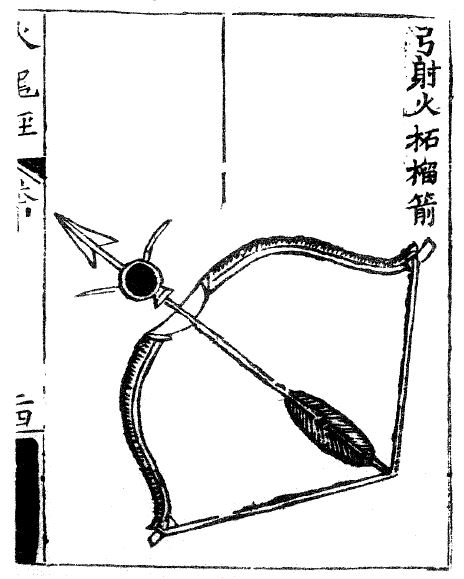
A fire arrow.

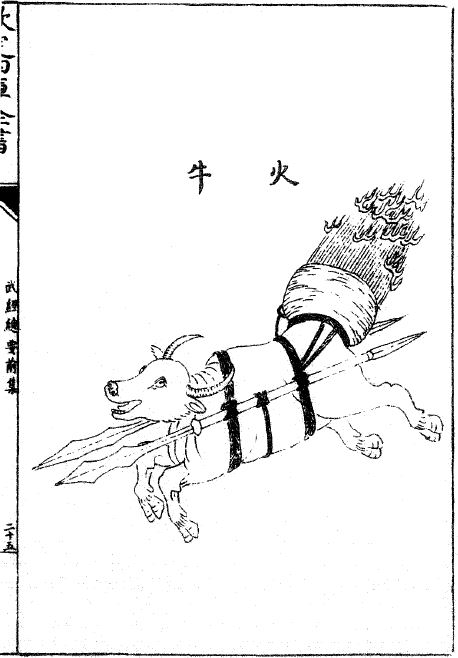
A fire ox - an ox with spears attached to its sides and its tail set on fire

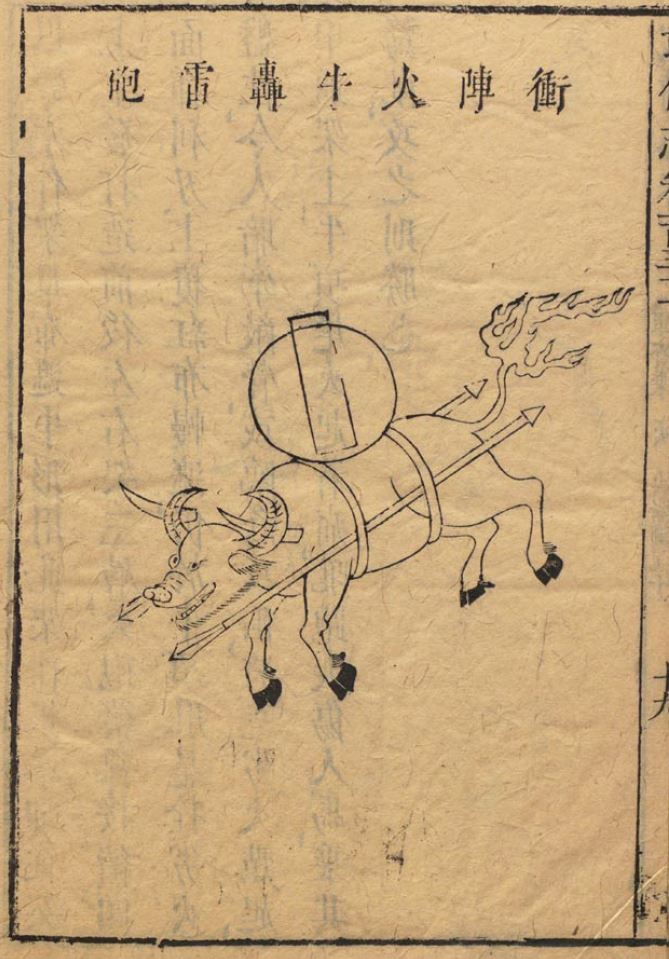
A fire ox with a bomb attached

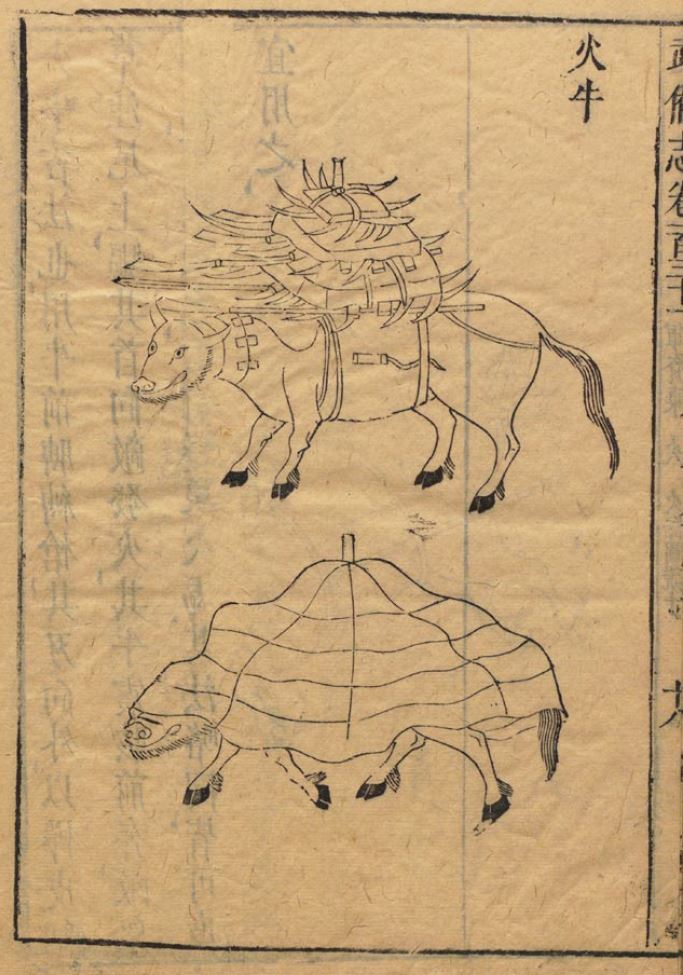
A fire ox with a shrapnel bomb containing numerous blades

The 'enemy of a thousand', a poisonous vapor bomb thrown at besieging invaders

== Various defensive measures ==
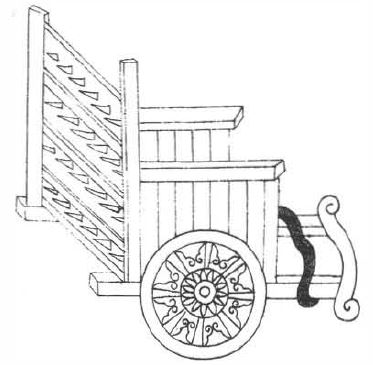
Gate blocking knife cart

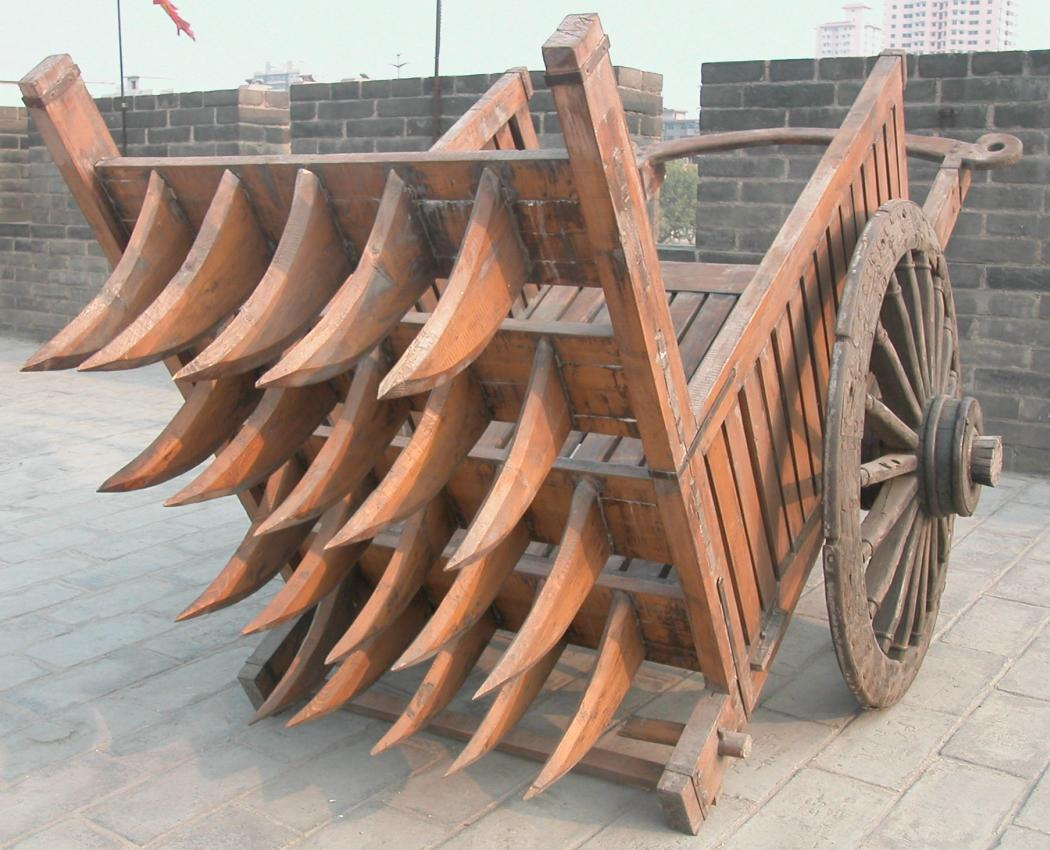
Modern reconstruction of the gate blocking knife cart

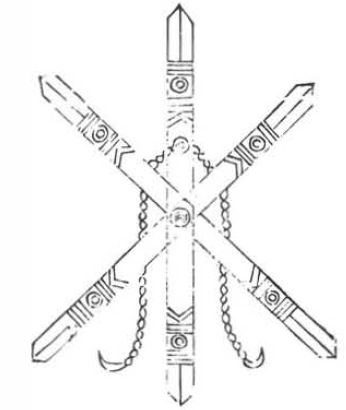
Cheval de frise

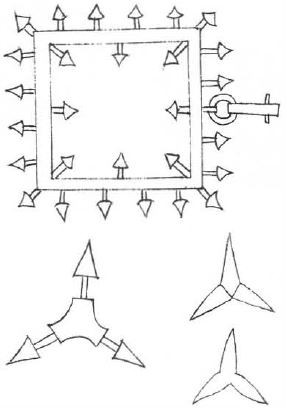
Hoof grasper and iron waterchestnuts

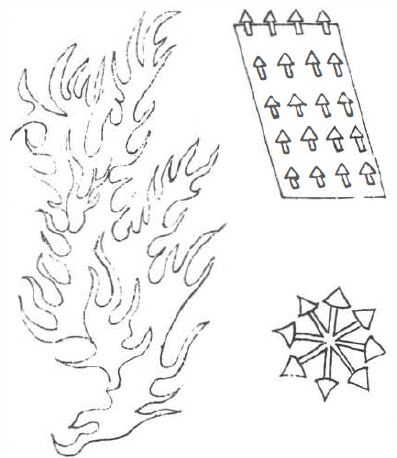
Deerhorn wood, earth stopper, and iron caltrop

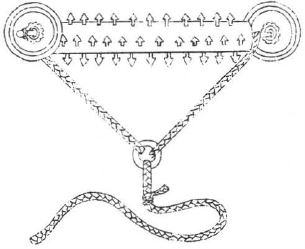
Night prong thunderstick

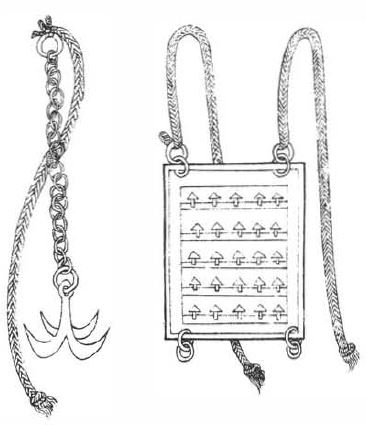
Flying hook and wolf's tooth striking board

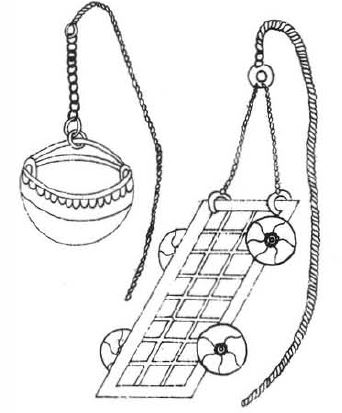
Wandering fire cauldron

== Bibliography ==
- Adle, Chahryar (2003), History of Civilizations of Central Asia: Development in Contrast: from the Sixteenth to the Mid-Nineteenth Century
- Ágoston, Gábor (2005), Guns for the Sultan: Military Power and the Weapons Industry in the Ottoman Empire, Cambridge University Press, ISBN 0-521-60391-9
- Agrawal, Jai Prakash (2010), High Energy Materials: Propellants, Explosives and Pyrotechnics, Wiley-VCH
- Andrade, Tonio (2016), The Gunpowder Age: China, Military Innovation, and the Rise of the West in World History, Princeton University Press, ISBN 978-0-691-13597-7.
- Arnold, Thomas (2001), The Renaissance at War, Cassell & Co, ISBN 0-304-35270-5
- Benton, Captain James G. (1862). A Course of Instruction in Ordnance and Gunnery (2 ed.). West Point, New York: Thomas Publications. ISBN 1-57747-079-6.
- Brown, G. I. (1998), The Big Bang: A History of Explosives, Sutton Publishing, ISBN 0-7509-1878-0.
- Buchanan, Brenda J., ed. (2006), "Gunpowder, Explosives and the State: A Technological History", Technology and Culture, vol. 49, Aldershot: Ashgate, pp. 785–786, doi:10.1353/tech.0.0051, ISBN 0-7546-5259-9, S2CID 111173101
- Chase, Kenneth (2003), Firearms: A Global History to 1700, Cambridge University Press, ISBN 0-521-82274-2.
- Cocroft, Wayne (2000), Dangerous Energy: The archaeology of gunpowder and military explosives manufacture, Swindon: English Heritage, ISBN 1-85074-718-0
- Cook, Haruko Taya (2000), Japan At War: An Oral History, Phoenix Press
- Cowley, Robert (1993), Experience of War, Laurel.
- Cressy, David (2013), Saltpeter: The Mother of Gunpowder, Oxford University Press
- Crosby, Alfred W. (2002), Throwing Fire: Projectile Technology Through History, Cambridge University Press, ISBN 0-521-79158-8.
- Curtis, W. S. (2014), Long Range Shooting: A Historical Perspective, WeldenOwen.
- Earl, Brian (1978), Cornish Explosives, Cornwall: The Trevithick Society, ISBN 0-904040-13-5.
- Easton, S. C. (1952), Roger Bacon and His Search for a Universal Science: A Reconsideration of the Life and Work of Roger Bacon in the Light of His Own Stated Purposes, Basil Blackwell
- Ebrey, Patricia B. (1999), The Cambridge Illustrated History of China, Cambridge University Press, ISBN 0-521-43519-6
- Grant, R.G. (2011), Battle at Sea: 3,000 Years of Naval Warfare, DK Publishing.
- Hadden, R. Lee. 2005. "Confederate Boys and Peter Monkeys." Armchair General. January 2005. Adapted from a talk given to the Geological Society of America on March 25, 2004.
- Harding, Richard (1999), Seapower and Naval Warfare, 1650-1830, UCL Press Limited
- al-Hassan, Ahmad Y. (2001), "Potassium Nitrate in Arabic and Latin Sources", History of Science and Technology in Islam.
- Haw, Stephen G. (2013), Cathayan Arrows and Meteors: The Origins of Chinese Rocketry
- Hobson, John M. (2004), The Eastern Origins of Western Civilisation, Cambridge University Press.
- Johnson, Norman Gardner. "explosive". Encyclopædia Britannica. Chicago: Encyclopædia Britannica Online.
- Kelly, Jack (2004), Gunpowder: Alchemy, Bombards, & Pyrotechnics: The History of the Explosive that Changed the World, Basic Books, ISBN 0-465-03718-6.
- Khan, Iqtidar Alam (1996), "Coming of Gunpowder to the Islamic World and North India: Spotlight on the Role of the Mongols", Journal of Asian History, 30: 41–5.
- Khan, Iqtidar Alam (2004), Gunpowder and Firearms: Warfare in Medieval India, Oxford University Press
- Khan, Iqtidar Alam (2008), Historical Dictionary of Medieval India, The Scarecrow Press, Inc., ISBN 978-0-8108-5503-8
- Kinard, Jeff (2007), Artillery An Illustrated History of its Impact
- Konstam, Angus (2002), Renaissance War Galley 1470-1590, Osprey Publisher Ltd..
- Liang, Jieming (2006), Chinese Siege Warfare: Mechanical Artillery & Siege Weapons of Antiquity, Singapore, Republic of Singapore: Leong Kit Meng, ISBN 981-05-5380-3
- Lidin, Olaf G. (2002), Tanegashima – The Arrival of Europe in Japan, Nordic Inst of Asian Studies, ISBN 8791114128
- Lorge, Peter A. (2008), The Asian Military Revolution: from Gunpowder to the Bomb, Cambridge University Press, ISBN 978-0-521-60954-8
- Lu, Gwei-Djen (1988), "The Oldest Representation of a Bombard", Technology and Culture, 29 (3): 594–605, doi:10.2307/3105275, JSTOR 3105275
- May, Timothy (2012), The Mongol Conquests in World History, Reaktion Books
- McLahlan, Sean (2010), Medieval Handgonnes
- McNeill, William Hardy (1992), The Rise of the West: A History of the Human Community, University of Chicago Press.
- Morillo, Stephen (2008), War in World History: Society, Technology, and War from Ancient Times to the Present, Volume 1, To 1500, McGraw-Hill, ISBN 978-0-07-052584-9
- Needham, Joseph (1971), Science and Civilization in China Volume 4 Part 3, Cambridge At The University Press
- Needham, Joseph (1980), Science & Civilisation in China, vol. 5 pt. 4, Cambridge University Press, ISBN 0-521-08573-X
- Needham, Joseph (1986), Science & Civilisation in China, vol. V:7: The Gunpowder Epic, Cambridge University Press, ISBN 0-521-30358-3.
- Needham, Joseph (1994), Science and Civilization in China Volume 5 Part 6, Cambridge University Press
- Nicolle, David (1990), The Mongol Warlords: Genghis Khan, Kublai Khan, Hulegu, Tamerlane
- Nicolle, David (11 March 2003). Medieval Siege Weapons (2): Byzantium, the Islamic World & India AD 476–1526. Bloomsbury USA. ISBN 978-1-84176-459-7.
- Nolan, Cathal J. (2006), The Age of Wars of Religion, 1000–1650: an Encyclopedia of Global Warfare and Civilization, Vol 1, A-K, vol. 1, Westport & London: Greenwood Press, ISBN 0-313-33733-0
- Norris, John (2003), Early Gunpowder Artillery: 1300–1600, Marlborough: The Crowood Press.
- Partington, J. R. (1960), A History of Greek Fire and Gunpowder, Cambridge, UK: W. Heffer & Sons.
- Partington, J. R. (1999), A History of Greek Fire and Gunpowder, Baltimore: Johns Hopkins University Press, ISBN 0-8018-5954-9
- Patrick, John Merton (1961), Artillery and warfare during the thirteenth and fourteenth centuries, Utah State University Press.
- Pauly, Roger (2004), Firearms: The Life Story of a Technology, Greenwood Publishing Group.
- Perrin, Noel (1979), Giving up the Gun, Japan's reversion to the Sword, 1543–1879, Boston: David R. Godine, ISBN 0-87923-773-2
- Petzal, David E. (2014), The Total Gun Manual (Canadian edition), WeldonOwen.
- Phillips, Henry Prataps (2016), The History and Chronology of Gunpowder and Gunpowder Weapons (c.1000 to 1850), Notion Press
- Purton, Peter (2010), A History of the Late Medieval Siege, 1200–1500, Boydell Press, ISBN 978-1-84383-449-6
- Robins, Benjamin (1742), New Principles of Gunnery
- Rose, Susan (2002), Medieval Naval Warfare 1000-1500, Routledge
- Roy, Kaushik (2015), Warfare in Pre-British India, Routledge
- Schmidtchen, Volker (1977a), "Riesengeschütze des 15. Jahrhunderts. Technische Höchstleistungen ihrer Zeit", Technikgeschichte 44 (2): 153–173 (153–157)
- Schmidtchen, Volker (1977b), "Riesengeschütze des 15. Jahrhunderts. Technische Höchstleistungen ihrer Zeit", Technikgeschichte 44 (3): 213–237 (226–228)
- Tran, Nhung Tuyet (2006), Viêt Nam Borderless Histories, University of Wisconsin Press.
- Turnbull, Stephen (2001), Siege Weapons of the Far East (1) AD 612-1300, Osprey Publishing
- Turnbull, Stephen (2002), Siege Weapons of the Far East (2) AD 960-1644, Osprey Publishing
- Turnbull, Stephen (2003), Fighting Ships Far East (2: Japan and Korea Ad 612-1639, Osprey Publishing, ISBN 1-84176-478-7
- Urbanski, Tadeusz (1967), Chemistry and Technology of Explosives, vol. III, New York: Pergamon Press.
- Villalon, L. J. Andrew (2008), The Hundred Years War (part II): Different Vistas, Brill Academic Pub, ISBN 978-90-04-16821-3
- Wagner, John A. (2006), The Encyclopedia of the Hundred Years War, Westport & London: Greenwood Press, ISBN 0-313-32736-X
- Watson, Peter (2006), Ideas: A History of Thought and Invention, from Fire to Freud, Harper Perennial (2006), ISBN 0-06-093564-2
- Wilkinson, Philip (9 September 1997), Castles, Dorling Kindersley, ISBN 978-0-7894-2047-3
- Wilkinson-Latham, Robert (1975), Napoleon's Artillery, France: Osprey Publishing, ISBN 0-85045-247-3
- Willbanks, James H. (2004), Machine guns: an illustrated history of their impact, ABC-CLIO, Inc.
- Williams, Anthony G. (2000), Rapid Fire, Shrewsbury: Airlife Publishing Ltd., ISBN 1-84037-435-7
