= AGM-158C LRASM =

American stealthy anti-ship cruise missile

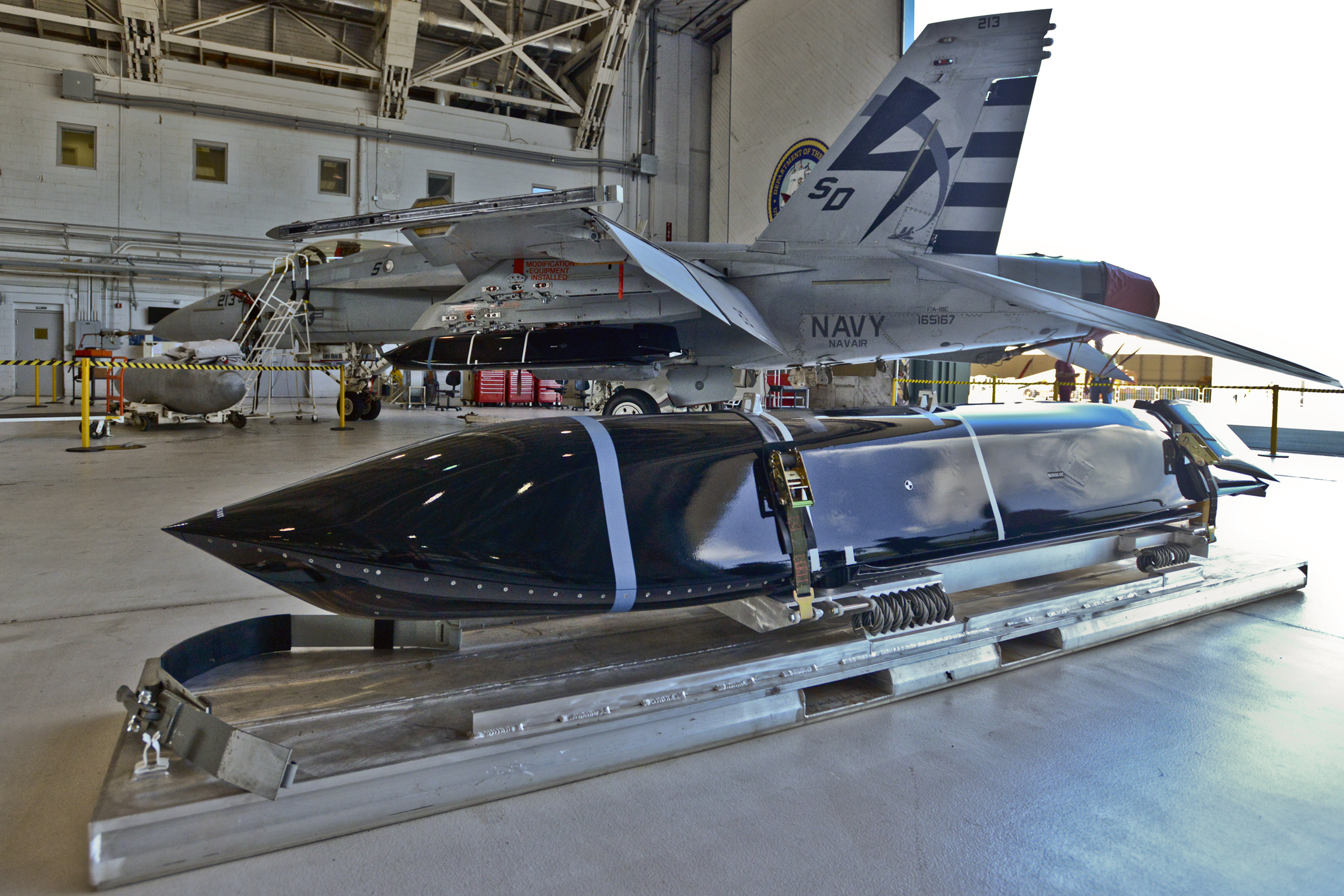
- A Long Range Anti-Ship Missile (LRASM) mass simulator integrated on an F/A-18E Super Hornet
- Type: Anti-ship missile
- Place of origin: United States

Service history
- In service: 2018–present
- Used by: United States Air Force; United States Navy; Royal Australian Air Force

Production history
- Designer: DARPA
- Designed: 2009–2017
- Manufacturer: Lockheed Martin
- Unit cost: USD $3.24 million (FY24)
- Produced: 2017–present

Specifications
- Mass: 2,760 lb (1,250 kg) est.
- Length: 14 ft (4.26 m) est.
- Width: 25 in (635 mm) est.
- Height: 18 in (450 mm) est.
- Wingspan: 8 ft 10 in (2.7 m)
- Warhead: WDU-42/B HE blast fragmentation penetrator
- Warhead weight: 1,000 lb (453.6 kg)
- Detonation mechanism: FMU-156/B fuze
- Engine: Williams F107-WR-105 turbofan
- Operational range: 500 nmi (926 km) est.
- Maximum speed: Mach 0.9 (310 m/s; 1,100 km/h)
- Guidance system: GPS, INS, IIR (EO), with AI guidance in on-board sensors (to detect high-value target)
- Steering system: Moving wings, 2 horizontal tailplanes & 1 vertical stabilizer
- Accuracy: 9 ft 10 in (3 m) CEP
- Launch platform: Air launched: – B-1 Lancer; – B-2 Spirit; – F-15E Strike Eagle (integrating); – F-15EX Eagle II (integrating); – F/A-18E/F Super Hornet; – F-35 Lightning II; – P-8 Poseidon (integrating); Surface launched: – Mk 41 VLS; – HIMARS (exploring)
- References: Janes & AFA

The AGM-158C LRASM (Long Range Anti-Ship Missile, colloquially pronounced lə-RAZ-ehm) is a stealth air launch anti-ship cruise missile developed for the United States Air Force and United States Navy by the Defense Advanced Research Projects Agency (DARPA). Derived from the AGM-158B JASSM-ER, the LRASM was intended to pioneer more sophisticated autonomous targeting capabilities than the U.S. Navy's current Harpoon anti-ship missile, which has been in service since 1977.

In June 2009, DARPA awarded a contract to Lockheed Martin for the two-phase LRASM demonstration program. In December 2013, DARPA publicized its intent to award a sole-source follow-on contract to Lockheed Martin for continued maturation of the LRASM subsystems and system design, which will be transitioned to the Navy. In March 2014, Raytheon/Kongsberg filed a joint protest with the U.S. Government Accountability Office (GAO) against DARPA's decision. In June 2014, GAO denied the protest, holding an award to any other source would be likely to cause substantial duplication of costs that were not expected to be recovered through competition, and unacceptable delays in meeting the Government's needs.

The Navy was authorized by the Pentagon to put the LRASM into limited production as an operational weapon in February 2014 as an urgent capability stop-gap solution to address range and survivability problems with the Harpoon and to prioritize defeating enemy warships, which has been neglected since the end of the Cold War but taken on importance with the modernization of the People's Liberation Army Navy.

In March 2014, the Navy said it will hold a competition for the Offensive Anti-Surface Warfare (OASuW)/Increment 2 anti-ship missile as a follow-on to LRASM to enter service in 2024. The OASuW Increment 2 competition will be completely open and start by FY 2017, and concluded in 2023 with the selection of a hypersonic anti-ship missile. It is expected the LRASM will compete against the joint Kongsberg/Raytheon offering of the Joint Strike Missile for air-launch needs and an upgraded Raytheon Tomahawk cruise missile for surface-launch needs. The missile chosen as the winner of the OASuW/Increment 2 anti-ship missile contest is the Hypersonic Air Launched Offensive Anti-Surface (HALO) program, a hypersonic anti-ship cruise missile that will initially be equipped on carrier capable aircraft like the F/A-18 Hornet and F-35C Lightning. The Navy awarded contracts to Raytheon and Lockheed Martin in March 2023 to develop competing missiles for HALO, with the Navy stating a desire for the missile to have multiple launch platform capabilities (air, surface, and subsurface). The Navy plans for the Zumwalt-class stealth guided missile destroyer and Block V Virginia-class submarine to field the HALO, giving them hypersonic missile capabilities in the near future.

In August 2015, the missile was officially designated AGM-158C.

== Design ==
Unlike current anti-ship missiles, the LRASM is expected to be capable of conducting autonomous targeting, relying on on-board targeting systems to independently acquire the target without the presence of prior, precision intelligence, or supporting services like Global Positioning Satellite navigation and data-links. These capabilities will enable positive target identification, precision engagement of moving ships and establishment of initial target cueing in extremely hostile environments. The missile will be designed with counter-countermeasures to evade hostile active defense systems.

The LRASM is based on the AGM-158B JASSM-ER, but incorporates a multi-mode passive RF, a new weapon data-link and altimeter, and an uprated power system. It can be directed to attack enemy ships by its launch platform, receive updates via its datalink, or use onboard sensors to find its target. LRASM will fly towards its target at medium altitude then drop to low altitude for a sea skimming approach to counter missile defenses. The AGM-158B JASSM-ER was estimated to have a maximum range of 500 nmi (930 km). However, LRASM's range is shorter than the JASSM-ER it's based upon, due to the extra space for the navigation/sensor/passive radar needs. Lockheed Martin has claimed the missile's range is greater than 200 nmi (370 km).

To ensure survivability to and effectiveness against a target, the LRASM is equipped with a BAE Systems-designed seeker and guidance system, integrating jam-resistant GPS/INS, an imaging infrared (IIR infrared homing) seeker with automatic scene/target matching recognition, a data-link, and passive electronic support measures (ESM) and radar warning receiver sensors. Artificial intelligence software combines these features to locate enemy ships and avoid neutral shipping in crowded areas. Automatic dissemination of emissions data is classified, located, and identified for path of attack; the data-link allows other assets to feed the missile a real-time electronic picture of the enemy battlespace. Multiple missiles can work together to share data to coordinate an attack in a swarm. Aside from short, low-power data-link transmissions, the LRASM does not emit signals, which combined with the low-RCS JASSM airframe and low IR signature reduces detectability. Unlike previous radar-only seeker-equipped missiles that went on to hit other vessels if diverted or decoyed, the multi-mode seeker ensures the correct target is hit in a specific area of the ship. An LRASM can find its own target autonomously by using its passive radar homing to locate ships in an area, then using passive measures once on terminal approach. Like the JASSM, the LRASM is capable of hitting land targets.

LRASM is designed to be compatible with the Mark 41 Vertical Launching System used on many U.S. Navy warships and to be fired from aircraft, including the B-1 Lancer. For surface launches, LRASM will be fitted with a modified Mk 114 jettisonable rocket booster to give it enough power to reach altitude. Although priority development is on air and surface-launched variants, Lockheed is exploring the concept of a submarine-launched variant, and deployment from a topside canister launcher for smaller ships. As part of OASUW Increment 1, the LRASM will be used only as an air-launched missile to be deployed from the F/A-18E/F Super Hornet and Rockwell B-1B Lancer, which has the capacity to carry 24 LRASMs. In 2020, the U.S. Navy began the process of integrating the LRASM onto the P-8 Poseidon maritime patrol aircraft, to be completed by 2026.

Some naval advisors have proposed increasing the LRASM's capabilities to serve dual functions as a ship-based land attack weapon in addition to anti-ship roles. By reducing the size of its 1,000 lb (450 kg) warhead to increase range from some 300 mi (480 km) to 1,000 mi (1,600 km), the missile would still be powerful enough to destroy or disable warships while having the reach to hit inland targets. With the proper guidance system, a single missile would increase the Navy's flexibility rather than needing two missiles specialized for different roles.

== Development ==
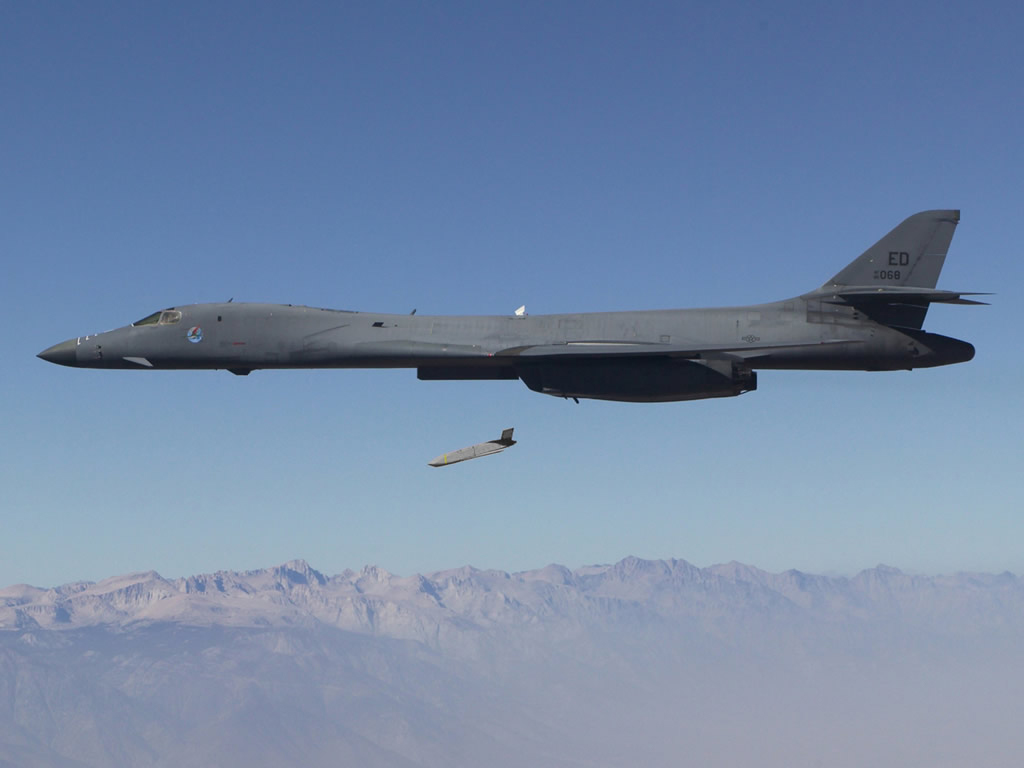
LRASM launches from Rockwell B-1B Lancer.

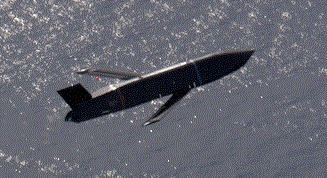
LRASM in flight.

The program was initiated in 2009 and started along two different tracks. LRASM-A is a subsonic cruise missile based on Lockheed Martin's 500 nm-range AGM-158 JASSM-ER; Lockheed Martin was awarded initial development contracts. LRASM-B was planned to be a high-altitude supersonic missile along the lines of the Indo-Russian BrahMos, but it was cancelled in January 2012. Captive carry flight tests of LRASM sensors began in May 2012; a missile prototype was planned to fly in "early 2013" and the first canister launch was intended for "end 2014".

On 1 October 2012, Lockheed received a contract modification to perform risk reduction enhancements in advance of the upcoming flight test of the air-launched LRASM-A version. On 5 March 2013, Lockheed received a contract to begin conducting air and surface-launch tests of the LRASM. On 3 June 2013, Lockheed successfully conducted "push through" tests of a simulated LRASM on the Mk 41 Vertical Launch System (VLS). Four tests verified the LRASM can break the canister's forward cover without damaging the missile. On 11 July 2013, Lockheed reported successful completion of captive-carry testing of the LRASM on a B-1B.

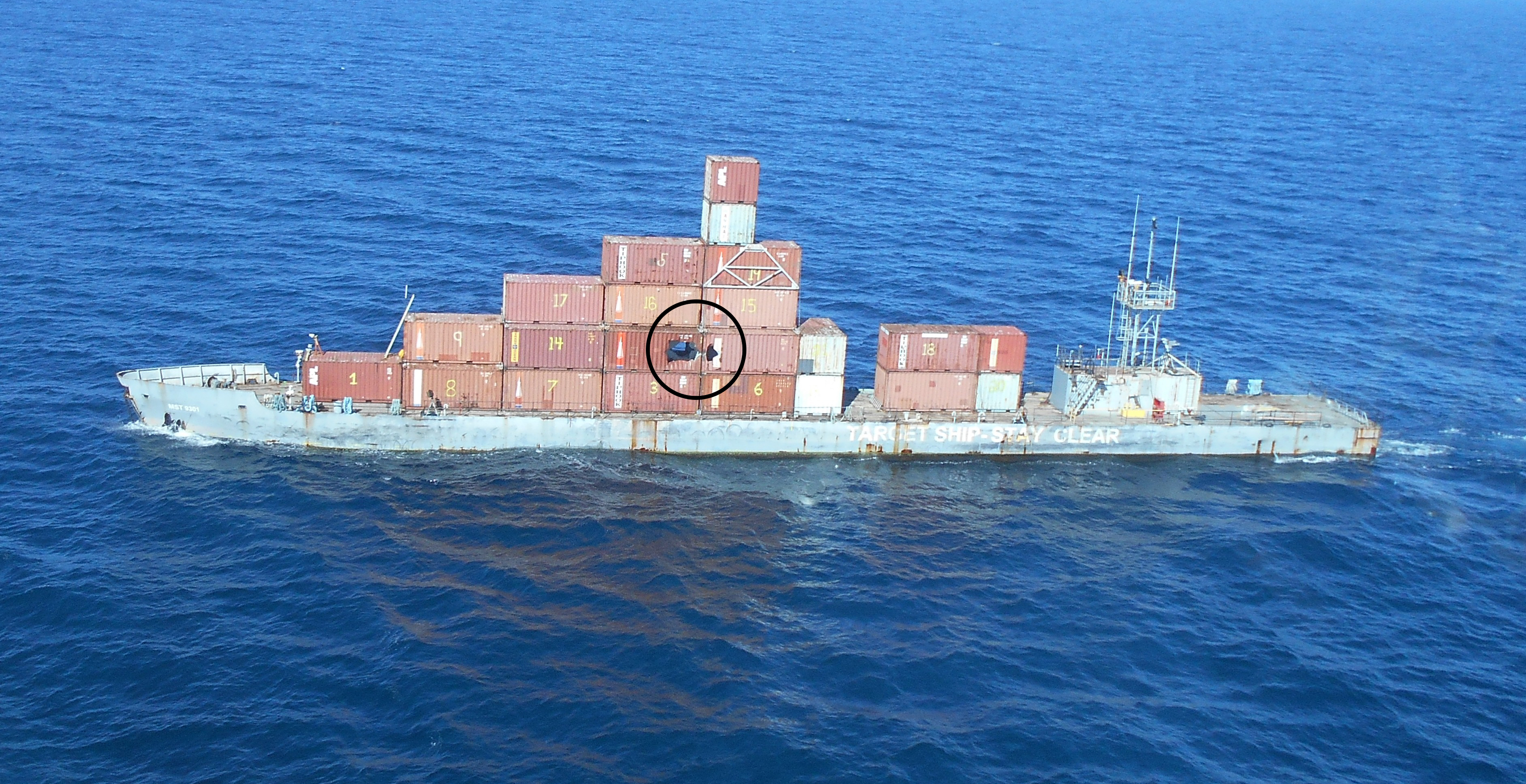
LRASM target practice

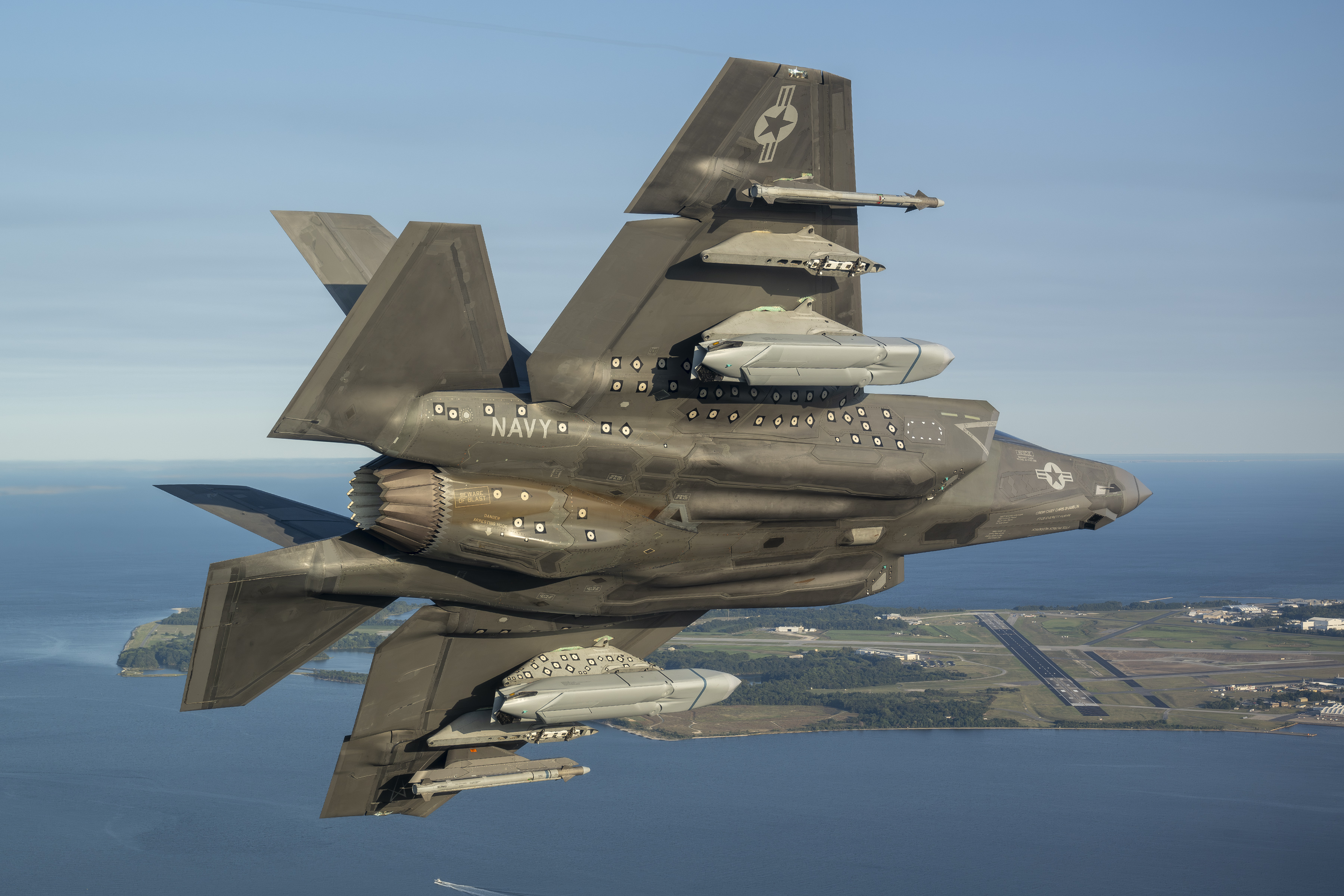
F-35C flight test with AGM-158Cs at NAS Patuxent River, September 2024

On 27 August 2013, Lockheed conducted the first flight test of the LRASM, launched from a B-1B. Halfway to its target, the missile switched from following a planned route to autonomous guidance. It autonomously detected its moving target, a 260 ft (79 m) unmanned ship out of three in the target area, and hit it in the desired location with an inert warhead. The purpose of the test was to stress the sensor suite, which detected all the targets and only engaged the one it was told to. Two more flight tests were planned the year, involving different altitudes, ranges, and geometries in the target area. Two launches from vertical launch systems were planned for summer 2014. The missile had a sensor designed by BAE Systems. The sensor is designed to enable targeted attacks within a group of enemy ships protected by sophisticated air defense systems. It autonomously located and targeted the moving surface ship. The sensor uses advanced electronic technologies to detect targets within a complex signal environment, and then calculates precise target locations for the missile control unit.

On 17 September 2013, Lockheed launched an LRASM Boosted Test Vehicle (BTV) from a Mk 41 VLS canister. The company-funded test showed the LRASM, fitted with the Mk 114 rocket motor from the RUM-139 VL-ASROC, could ignite and penetrate the canister cover and perform a guided flight profile. In January 2014, Lockheed demonstrated that the LRASM could be launched from a Mk 41 VLS with only modified software to existing shipboard equipment.

On 12 November 2013, an LRASM scored a direct hit on a moving naval target on its second flight test. A B-1B bomber launched the missile, which navigated using planned waypoints that it received in-flight before transitioning to autonomous guidance. It used onboard sensors to select the target, descend in altitude, and successfully impact. On 4 February 2015, the LRASM conducted its third successful flight test, conducted to evaluate low-altitude performance and obstacle avoidance. Dropped from a B-1B, the missile navigated a series of planned waypoints, then detected, tracked, and avoided an object deliberately placed in the flight pattern in the final portion of the flight to demonstrate obstacle-avoidance algorithms.

In August 2015, the Navy began load and fit checks of an LRASM mass simulator vehicle on an F/A-18 Super Hornet. Initial airworthiness flight testing of the LRASM simulator with the Super Hornet began on 3 November 2015, with the first flight occurring on 14 December, and load testing completed on 6 January 2016.

In July 2016, Lockheed successfully conducted the third surface launch of the LRASM following two tests at the Navy's Desert Ship, firing it from the Navy's Self Defense Test Ship (formerly the USS Paul F. Foster). Tied to a Tactical Tomahawk Weapon Control System (TTWCS) for guidance and boosted by the Mk 114 motor, it flew a planned, low-altitude profile to its pre-determined endpoint. While the missile is currently planned to be exclusively air-launched, future requirements for employment across several launch platforms led to investment in risk-reduction for the future competition.

On 4 April 2017, Lockheed announced the first successful release of the LRASM from an F/A-18 Super Hornet. On 26 July 2017, Lockheed was awarded the first production award for the air-launched LRASM; low-rate initial production Lot 1 includes 23 missiles. On 27 July 2017, Lockheed announced they had successfully conducted the first launch of an LRASM from an angled topside canister using a Mk 114 booster, demonstrating the missile's ability to be used on platforms lacking vertical launch cells.

On 17 August 2017, the LRASM conducted its first flight test in a production-representative, tactical configuration. The missile was dropped from a B-1B Lancer, navigated through all planned waypoints, transitioned to mid-course guidance and flew toward a moving maritime target using inputs from its onboard sensor, then descended to low altitude for final approach, positively identifying and impacting the target.

The weapon was successfully fired against multiple targets on 13 December 2017, by a B-1B flying over the Point Mugu Sea Range. In May 2018, a second flight test, involving two LRASMs, was successfully completed.

In December 2018, the LRASM was integrated on the USAF's B-1 Lancer, reaching initial operational capability. The missile achieved early operational capability on Navy Super Hornets in November 2019.

In 2020, The US Navy began plans to integrate the LRASM on the Boeing P-8 Poseidon.

In February 2021, U.S. Navy and Air Force awarded a $414 million contract to Lockheed Martin for continued production of the air-launched variant of LRASM, now operational on the U.S. Navy F/A-18E/F and U.S. Air Force B-1B.

In September 2024, the U.S. Navy completed an initial flight test of the F-35C carrying the LRASM, followed in March 2025 by an initial flight test of the F-35B carrying the missile.

== Foreign interest ==
In 2015, Sweden publicly expressed interest in the LRASM in response to concerns of Russian actions in Eastern Europe. The United Kingdom, Singapore, Canada, Australia and Japan have also expressed interest in the missile.

On 7 February 2020, the U.S. Department of State announced it had approved a possible foreign military sale to Australia of up to 200 LRASMs and related equipment for an estimated cost of US$990 million. In July 2020, Australia announced that it was acquiring the LRASM for their F/A-18F Super Hornet fighters. The RAAF achieved initial operational capability for the LRASM in September 2026.

== Operators ==
=== Current ===
United States

- U.S. Air Force
- U.S. Navy

Australia

- Royal Australian Air Force: 200 missiles acquired for use on F/A-18F Super Hornets of No. 1 Squadron RAAF.

== See also ==
- AGM-181 LRSO – (United States)
- SOM – (Turkey)
- BrahMos – (India, Russia)
- Naval Strike Missile – (Norway)
- RBS-15 – (Sweden)
- 3M54/3M14 Kalibr – (Russia)
- P-800 Oniks/Yakhont – (Russia)
- Kh-22 – (Soviet Union)
- Kh-35 – (Russia)
- Kh-32 – (Russia)
- AKF-98 – (China)
- YJ-18C – (China)
- YJ-100 – (China)
- Type 12 surface-to-ship missile – (Japan)
- ASM-3 – (Japan)
- Hsiung Feng III – (Taiwan)
- Future Cruise/Anti-Ship Weapon – (France, Italy, United Kingdom)
