= AGM-181 LRSO =

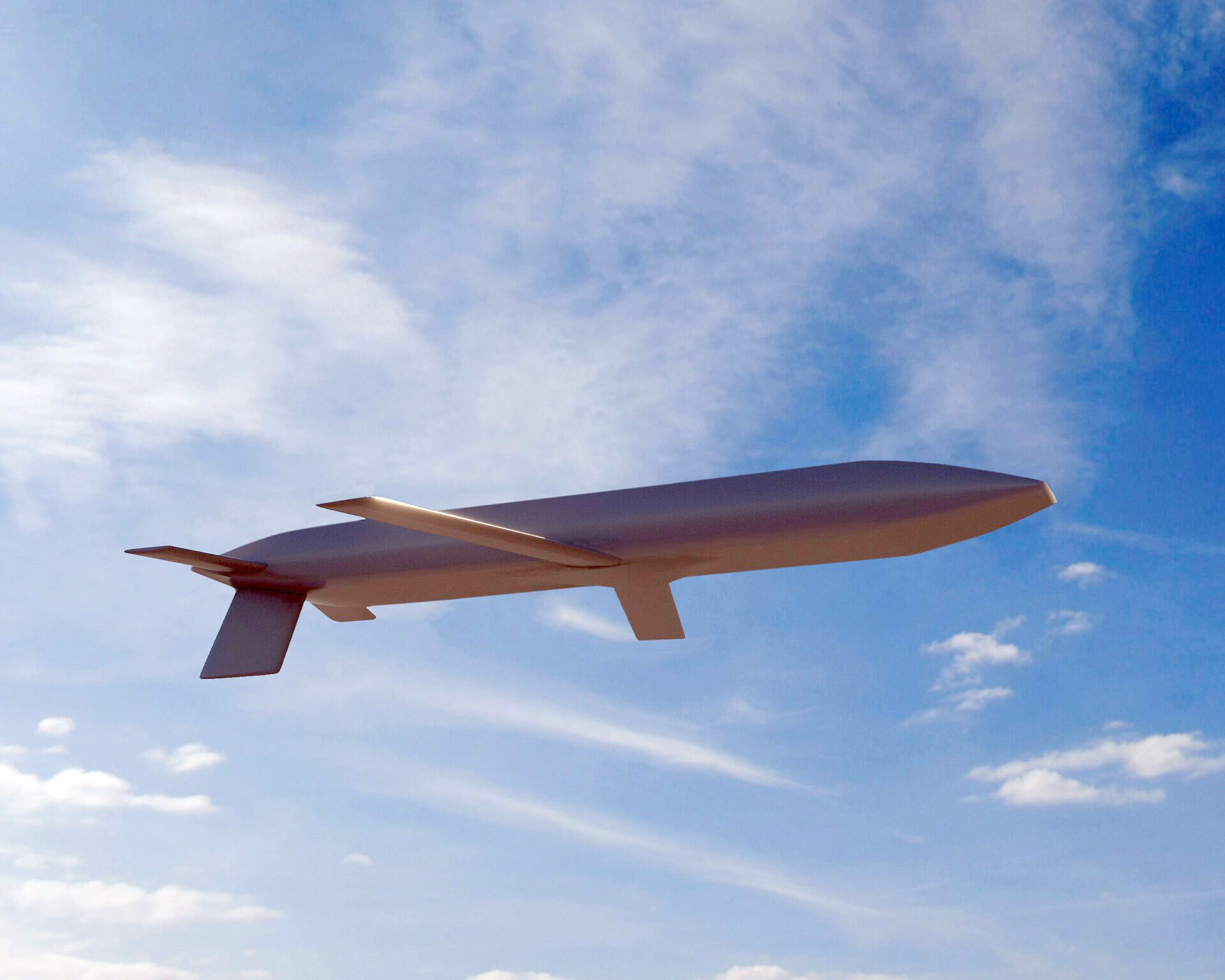
- Rendering of the AGM-181 LRSO
- Type: Standoff air-launched cruise missile

Service history
- Used by: United States Armed Forces

Production history
- Manufacturer: RTX Corporation
- Unit cost: $13.33m

Specifications
- Warhead: W80 Mod 4 thermonuclear weapon
- Engine: Williams F107
- Operational range: 2,500+ km (predicted)
- Launch platform: B-52 Stratofortress; B-2 Spirit; B-21 Raider

The AGM-181 Long Range Stand Off Weapon (LRSO) is a nuclear-armed air-launched cruise missile under development by Raytheon Technologies that will replace the AGM-86 ALCM. It will be carried by the B2A Spirit and B-21 Raider stealth bombers in addition to the B-52J Stratofortress platform of its predecessor. The LRSO program is to develop a weapon that can penetrate and survive integrated air defense systems and prosecute strategic targets. The weapons are required to reach initial operational capability (IOC) before the retirement of their respective ALCM versions, around 2030.

The FY2020 defense authorization bill passed by Congress repealed the requirement for a conventional warhead version of the LRSO, leaving only the nuclear armed variant. The Air Force will use the JASSM-ER and the longer-ranged JASSM-XR to fulfill the conventional standoff missile role.

== Development ==
To replace the ALCM, the USAF planned to award a contract for the development of the new Long-Range Stand-Off weapon in 2015, with technology development contracts to be submitted before the end of 2012. Contracting was intended to end in 2022, when the Department of Defense was to select one design to continue further developments. However, in March 2014 a further three-year delay in the project was announced by the Department of Defense, delaying a contract award until fiscal year 2018. The House Armed Services Committee moved to reject this delay. The delay was caused by financial pressures and an uncertain acquisition plan, and allowed by the long remaining service life left for the AGM-86 and lack of urgent necessity compared to other defense needs.

On August 24, 2017, Lockheed Martin and Raytheon received separate $900 million contracts from the Department of Defense and US Air Force to develop prototypes of the LRSO, designated YAGM-180A and YAGM-181A respectively. In April 2020, the Air Force announced plans to continue the Long-Range Standoff Weapon’s development with Raytheon Company as a sole-source contractor. On 1 July 2021, the USAF awarded Raytheon a cost-plus-fixed-fee contract for the engineering and manufacturing development stage of the LRSO program, with options that could take the contract to about US$2 billion. DefenseNews reported that the USAF could buy more than 1,000 AGM-181 missiles, which are projected to have a range in excess of 1,500 miles (2,400 km).

As of December 2022 the missile had undergone at least nine test flights, and by March 2023 the missile passed a critical design review.

In 2024, Boeing was contracted to integrate the missile with the B-52.

In November 2025, a B-52 bomber was spotted carrying what appeared to be two test-modified AGM-181 missiles, bearing many similarities to the only publicly released rendering of the weapon. In March 2026, examples of the AGM-181 were again spotted while being carried by a B-52 bomber.

== Design ==
The missile's nuclear warhead will be the W80-4 warhead.

== Users ==
- United States (planned)

== See also ==
- ASN4G, French nuclear-armed air-launched cruise missile currently in development
