= AGM-137 TSSAM =

Canceled American cruise missile

- Type: Stealthy stand-off precision weapon
- Place of origin: United States

Service history
- In service: did not enter service

Production history
- Manufacturer: Northrop

Specifications
- Mass: 2,000 lb (910 kg)
- Length: 168 in (4,300 mm)
- Wingspan: 100 in (2,500 mm)
- Engine: Williams F122-WR-100 turbofan
- Operational range: 100 nmi (120 mi; 190 km)+
- Guidance system: INS With GPS updates Infrared terminal guidance
- Launch platform: Proposed B-52H; B-1B; B-2A; F-16C/D; A-6E F/A-18C/D

The Northrop AGM-137 TSSAM (Tri-Service Standoff Attack Missile) was a standoff cruise missile developed for the three branches of the United States Armed Forces, hence "tri-service". Missile development began in 1986 but revelation of cost-overruns in 1991 prompted the Army to pull out of the project and an investigation of the procurement process by the General Accounting Office (GAO, now referred to as the Government Accountability Office). The TSSAM program was eventually cancelled in December 1994 pursuant to a GAO recommendation and the loss of support of the United States Army after going as far as several test launches.

== Development ==
The United States Air Force began developing the Tri-Service Standoff Attack Missile (TSSAM) in 1986; the intent was to produce a family of stealthy missiles for the U.S. Air Force, Navy and United States Army which would be capable of long range, autonomous guidance, automatic target recognition, and sufficient accuracy and warhead power to be capable of destroying well-protected structures either on land or at sea.

All versions of the missile would use inertial navigation aided by Global Positioning System (GPS). The Navy and one Air Force version were to use an imaging infrared homing terminal sensor to recognize the target and terminal homing, and would be fitted with a unitary warhead. A second version Army missile would be launched by two booster rockets and carry the Combined Effects Bomblet (CEB) submunition against land targets.

It was planned to carry the missile on the B-52H, F-16C/D, B-1, B-2, A-6E, and F/A-18C/D; the Army version was to be launched from the MLRS (Multiple Launch Rocket System) vehicle.

In 1991 the previously black budget figures for TSSAM were revealed, showing a roughly 6 billion dollar cost overrun over the original contract price. This prompted a GAO investigation into the procurement process which resulted in the recommendation that the project be cancelled.

The project suffered from budgetary problems, some related to the distribution of the budget between the three services. This resulted in funding shortfalls and delays. The missiles also suffered from technical development issues, pushing the unit cost from the original 1986 figure of $728,000 per missile to $2,062,000 in 1994. The project which was intended to be used by all three services (hence, Tri-service), lost Army support in 1993 and was canceled as a result. Technology developed for the TSSAM was used in the JASSM program.

== See also ==
- List of missiles
