= AGM-158 JASSM =

American low observable air-launched cruise missile

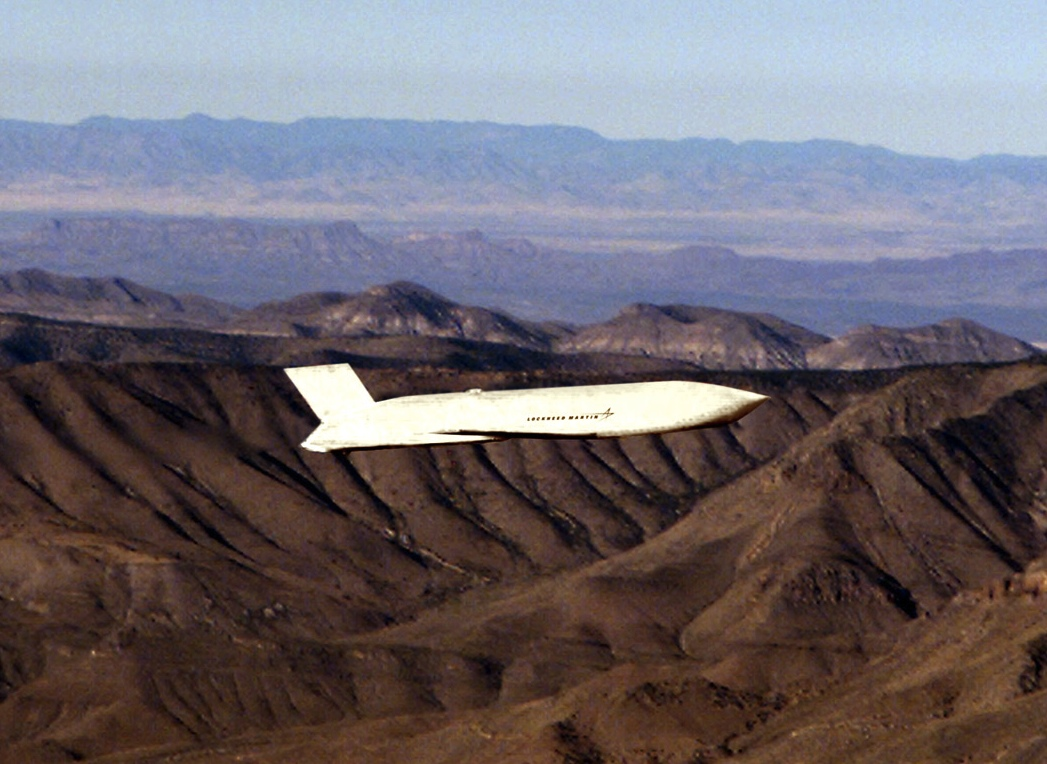
- Type: Air-launched cruise missile
- Place of origin: United States

Service history
- In service: 2003–present
- Used by: United States Air Force; Royal Australian Air Force; Polish Air Force; Finnish Air Force
- Wars: Syrian Civil War; U.S. intervention in Syria; Yemeni Civil War; Operation Rough Rider; 2026 Iran war

Production history
- Designer: Lockheed Martin
- Designed: 1995–1998
- Manufacturer: Lockheed Martin Missiles and Fire Control
- Unit cost: $698,000 (JASSM Baseline AGM-158A, FY17)
- Produced: 1998–present
- No. built: 7,500

Specifications (AGM-158A)
- Mass: 2,251 lb (1,021 kg)
- Length: 14 ft 1 in (4.287 m)
- Width: 22 in (550 mm)
- Height: 18 in (450 mm)
- Warhead: WDU-42/B penetrator
- Warhead weight: 1,000 lb (450 kg)
- Detonation mechanism: FMU-156/B
- Engine: Teledyne CAE J402-CA-100 turbojet 674 lbf (3 kN)
- Operational range: 230 mi (370.4 km)
- Guidance system: GPS, INS, IIR
- Steering system: Moving wings & 2 tailplanes
- Accuracy: 9 ft 10 in (3 m) CEP
- Launch platform: B-1 Lancer, B-2 Spirit, B-52 Stratofortress, F-15E Strike Eagle, F-16 Fighting Falcon, F/A-18 Hornet; Rapid Dragon: C-130, C-17
- References: Janes

Joint Air-to-Surface Standoff Missile Extended Range (JASSM-ER)

Production history
- Designed: 2002
- Manufacturer: Lockheed Martin Missiles and Fire Control
- Unit cost: $1.04 million AGM-158B, FY20 $1.665 million AGM-158B-2, FY24
- Produced: AGM-158 since 2006; AGM-158B-2 since FY2024
- No. built: 3360

Specifications (AGM-158B JASSM-ER)
- Mass: 2,600 lb (1,200 kg) (est)
- Length: 14 ft 1 in (4.287 m)
- Width: 25 in (635 mm)
- Height: 18 in (450 mm)
- Wingspan: 8 ft 10 in (2.7 m)
- Warhead: WDU-42/B penetrator
- Warhead weight: 1,000 lb (450 kg)
- Detonation mechanism: FMU-156/B AGM-158B; FMU-162/B AGM-158B-2 and on
- Engine: Williams F107-WR-105 turbofan 1,400 lbf (6.22 kN)
- Operational range: >575 mi (926 km)
- Guidance system: INS, IIR, GPS (M-code AGM-158B-3)
- Accuracy: 9 ft 10 in (3 m) CEP
- References: JanesDOT&E SAF/FM

The AGM-158 Joint Air-to-Surface Standoff Missile (AGM-158 JASSM; colloquially pronounced JASS-ehm, JAZ-ehm) is a low detection standoff air-launched cruise missile developed by Lockheed Martin for the United States Armed Forces. It is a large, stealthy long-range weapon with a 1,000-pound (450 kg) armor piercing warhead. It completed testing and entered service with the U.S. Air Force in 2009, and has entered foreign service in Australia, Finland, and Poland as of 2014. An extended range version of the missile, the AGM-158B JASSM-ER (Joint Air-to-Surface Standoff Missile-Extended Range), entered service in 2014 as well as an anti-ship derivative, the AGM-158C LRASM (Long Range Anti-Ship Missile) in 2018.

== Program overview ==
=== Origins ===
The JASSM project began in 1995 after the cancellation of the AGM-137 TSSAM project. The TSSAM was designed as a high precision stealthy missile for use at standoff distances, but poor management of the project resulted in rising costs. Since the requirement for such weapons still existed, the military quickly announced a follow-up project with similar goals. Initial contracts for two competing designs were awarded to Lockheed Martin and McDonnell Douglas in 1996, and the missile designations AGM-158A and AGM-159A were allocated to the two weapons. Lockheed Martin's AGM-158A won and a contract for further development was awarded in 1998.

The AGM-158A is powered by a Teledyne CAE J402 turbojet. Before launch the wings are folded to reduce size. Upon launch the wings deploy automatically. There is a single vertical tail. Guidance is via inertial navigation with global positioning system updates. An imaging infrared seeker provides target recognition and terminal homing. A data link allows the missile to transmit its location and status during flight, allowing improved bomb damage assessment. The warhead is a WDU-42/B 1,000 lb (450 kg) penetrator. The JASSM may be carried by a wide range of aircraft: the F-15E; F-16; F/A-18; F-35; B-1B; B-2; and B-52 are all intended to carry the weapon. Unlike typical cruise missiles, which fly close to the ground to avoid detection, the JASSM's stealthy design allows it to fly at higher altitudes to achieve long flight ranges without using up energy maneuvering around terrain obstacles.

The Center for Strategic and Budgetary Assessments (CSBA) has suggested lightening the warhead of the AGM-158A to increase its range. That way it would be able to be fired a greater distance from enemy air defenses while being cheaper and available in greater numbers for protracted conflicts than the AGM-158B JASSM-ER variant.

By 2023, Lockheed Martin could produce over 500 missiles total of JASSM and LRASM versions per year, with plans to increase production to 1,000 missiles annually.

=== Problematic development ===
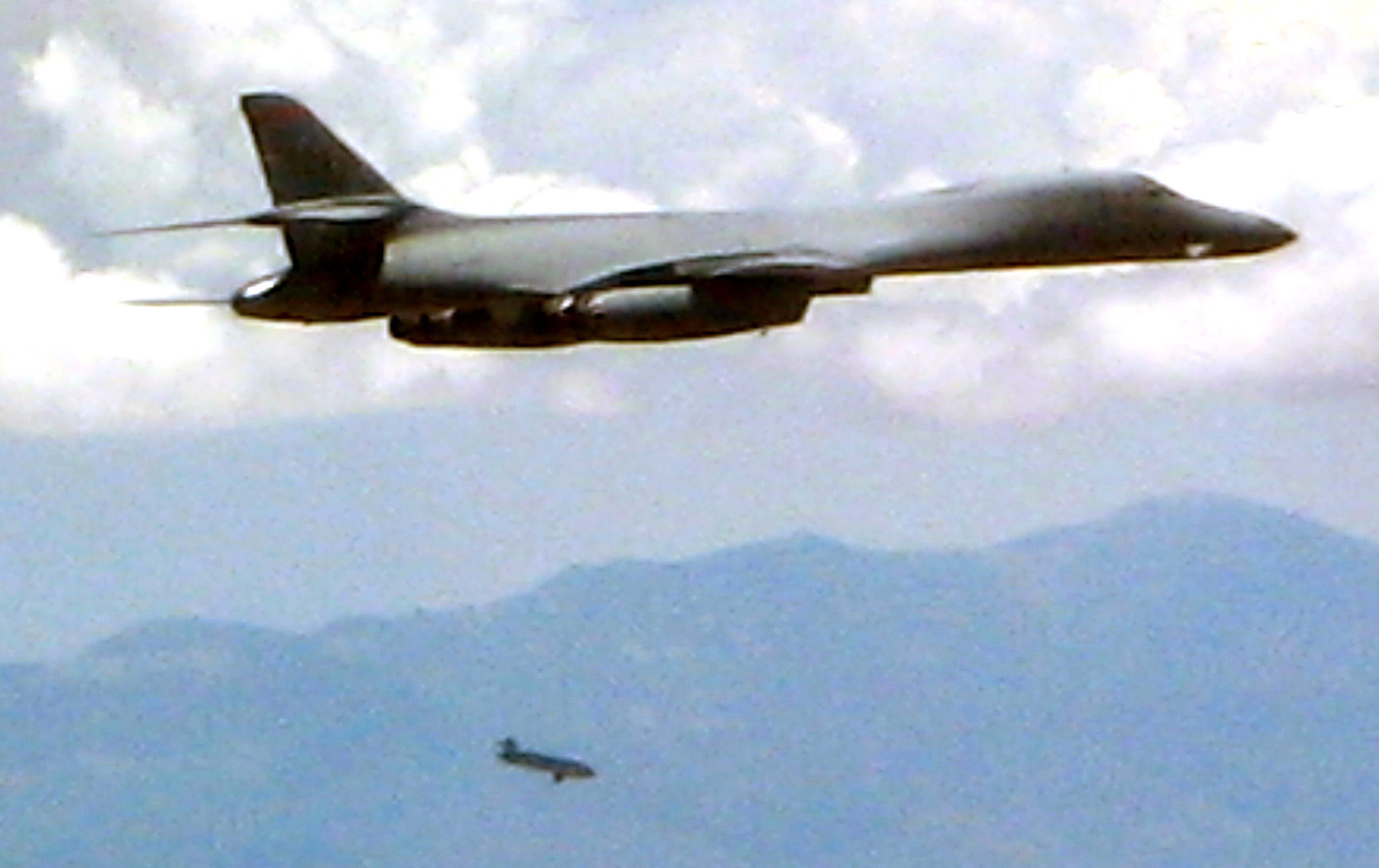
Test launch in 2005 at White Sands

In 1999, powered flight tests of the missile began. These were successful, and production of the JASSM began in December 2001. The weapon began operational testing and evaluation in 2002. Late that year, two missiles failed tests and the project was delayed for three months before completing development in April 2003. Two more launches failed, this time as a result of launcher and engine problems. In July 2007, a $68 million program to improve JASSM reliability and recertify the missile was approved by the Department of Defense. A decision on whether to continue with the program was deferred until spring 2008. Lockheed agreed to fix the missiles at its own cost and tightened up its manufacturing processes.

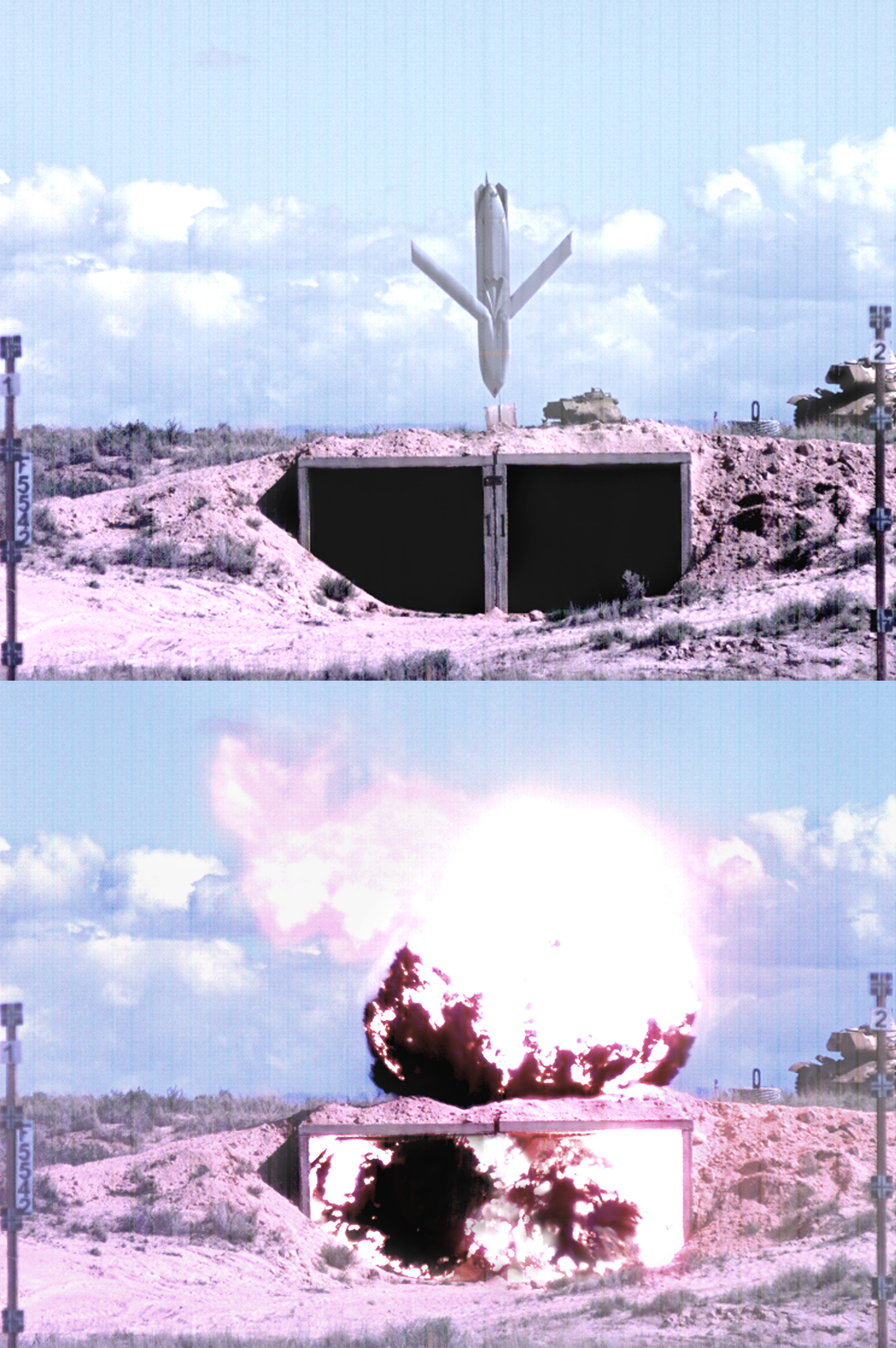
A JASSM detonates above a hardened target during tests

On 27 August 2009, David Van Buren, assistant secretary of the Air Force for acquisition, said that there would be a production gap for the JASSM while further tests were held. Further tests in 2009 were more successful however, with 15 out of 16 rounds hitting the intended target, well above the 75% benchmark set for the test. This cleared JASSM for entry into service. The United States Air Force plans to acquire up to 4,900 AGM-158 missiles. Meanwhile, the United States Navy had originally planned to acquire 453 AGM-158 missiles but instead pulled out of the program in favor of retaining the proven AGM-84H/K SLAM-ER.

=== Foreign sales ===
==== Australia ====
In 2006 the Australian government announced the selection of the Lockheed Martin JASSM to equip the Royal Australian Air Force's F/A-18 Hornet fighters. This announcement came as part of a program to phase out the RAAFs F-111C strike aircraft, replacing the AGM-142 Popeye stand off missile and providing a long-range strike capability to the Hornets. JASSM was selected over the SLAM-ER after the European Taurus KEPD 350 withdrew its tender offer, despite the KEPD 350 being highly rated in the earlier RFP process, due to their heavy involvement in the series preparation for the German Air Force, their troop trials in South Africa and their final negotiations with the Spanish Air Force which finally led to a contract. As of mid-2010 the JASSM was in production for Australia and was planned then to enter service soon.

In September 2021, Australian Prime Minister Scott Morrison announced that Australia would acquire the JASSM-ER for the RAAF's F/A-18F Super Hornet and F-35A fighters.

==== Finland ====
Finland had also previously planned to purchase JASSM missiles for the Finnish Air Force as part of modernization plans of its F/A-18 Hornet fleet. However, in February 2007 the United States declined to sell the missiles, while agreeing to proceed as planned with other modernization efforts (the so-called Mid-Life Update 2, or MLU2). However, in October 2011 the US DSCA announced that they had given permission for a possible sale to Finland. An order, valued €178.5 million was placed in March 2012. In 2014 it was reported that Lockheed had "received three Finnish integration-related contracts since 2012". In 2020 Finland decided to procure 200 JASSM-ER missiles. Finland's integration work was originally scheduled to be completed by the end of 2016, but didn't complete until March 2018 when Finnish F/A-18 Hornets successfully test fired two JASSM missiles at Naval Air Weapons Station (NAWS) China Lake.

JASSM is just as much a deterrent capability, as it is a strike capability. It makes the enemy pause and think twice about aggressive action, because it provides precision strike of a wide range of valuable targets. — Senior Finnish official on why Finland needed these missiles

==== Italy ====
On 5 December 2025, the U.S. Defense Security Cooperation Agency (DSCA) declared that the State Department has approved a possible Foreign Military Sale (FMS) to Italy of 100 missiles AGM-158B/B2 JASSM-ER. The sale will include the weapons, and also support equipment, engineering, technical, and logistics support services, at an estimated cost of $301 million. The JASSM-ER will equip the F-35 Lightning II fighters and might not be limited to the 5th generation fighter since it will be possible to use it on other platforms.

==== South Korea ====
In 2013 South Korea sought the JASSM to boost the South Korean Air Force's striking capability but was refused by Washington. The South Korean government instead turned their attention towards the Taurus KEPD 350 missile.

==== Poland ====
In 2014, Poland requested US Congressional approval for the purchase of the AGM-158 JASSM to extend the deep penetration strike capabilities of their F-16 Block 52+ fighters. Congress approved the sale in early October, and negotiations concluded in early November 2014. Poland signed a $250 million contract to upgrade its F-16s and equip the jets with (AGM-158) JASSM advanced cruise missiles in a ceremony at Poznan AB, Poland, on 11 December 2014. The missiles were expected to enter operational service in 2017, and Poland was contemplating an additional purchase for the long-range JASSM-ER version. In December 2015 the production contract for Lot 13 was signed. The contract included 140 JASSMs for Finland, Poland, and the US; 140 JASSM-ER missiles for the US; and data, tooling, and test equipment. It was stated to be the last production lot that would include non-ER versions. As of 2015, Poland's first modified F-16s were planned to be ready by 2017, when the first missiles are slated to be delivered. The work is scheduled to be complete by June 29, 2019. In November 2016, The U.S. State Department approved the possible sale of 70 AGM-158B JASSM-ER to Poland. As of March 2024, the US State Department approved a potential sale of up to 821 additional AGM-158B-2 JASSM-ER All-Up-Rounds and various additional support equipment to the Polish Government for $1.77 billion.

==== Japan ====
In its 2019 Mid-term Defense Program, the Japanese government introduced a plan to purchase JASSM-ER and the AGM-158C LRASM for use in its F-15J fleet.

Acquisition of up to 50 JASSM-ER was approved by the US State Department in August 2023. However, because the plan to modify F-15Js to equip these missiles went over budget, LRASM was dropped in 2021 in favor of the improved version (in development) of Japan's home-made Type 12 surface-to-ship missile.

== Improved versions ==
=== AGM-158B JASSM-ER ===
The US Air Force studied various improvements to the AGM-158, resulting in the development of the JASSM-Extended Range (JASSM-ER), which received the designation AGM-158B in 2002. Using a more efficient engine and larger fuel volume in an airframe with the same external dimensions as the JASSM, the JASSM-ER is intended to have a range of over 575 mi (925 km) compared to the JASSM's range of about 230 mi (370 km). Other possible improvements were studied but ultimately not pursued, including a submunition dispenser warhead, new types of homing head, and a new engine giving ranges in excess of 620 mi (1,000 km). The JASSM-ER has 70% hardware commonality and 95% software commonality with the original AGM-158 JASSM.

The first flight test of the JASSM-ER occurred on May 18, 2006 when a missile was launched from a U.S. Air Force B-1 bomber at the White Sands Missile Range in New Mexico. The initial platform for the JASSM-ER is the B-1. While both the original JASSM and the JASSM-ER are several inches too long to be carried in the internal weapons bay of the F-35 Lightning II, the F-35 will be able to carry both missiles externally, which would compromise the aircraft's stealth features.

The JASSM-ER entered service with the USAF in April 2014. Although the B-1 was initially the only aircraft able to deploy it, it was later integrated onto the B-52, F-15E, and F-16; the B-1B can carry a full load of 24 JASSM-ERs, the B-2 16 missiles, and the B-52 outfitted with the 1760 Internal Weapons Bay Upgrade (IWBU) is able to carry 20 JASSM-ERs, 8 internally and 12 on external pylons. It is also carried on U.S. Navy F/A-18E/F Super Hornet and F-35C fighters. The Air Force approved full-rate production of the JASSM-ER in December 2014. Integration of the JASSM-ER onto the B-52 and F-16 was expected to wrap up in 2018, with the F-15E completed after that; it was announced that the JASSM-ER achieved full operational capability on the F-15E in February 2018. Lot 15 production contract, awarded in June 2017 was the first consisting entirely JASSM-ER.

On 14 May 2015, the head of the Air Force Research Laboratory nominated the JASSM-ER as the optimal air vehicle to carry the Counter-electronics High Power Microwave Advanced Missile Project (CHAMP) payload. CHAMP is an electronic warfare technology that fries electronic equipment with bursts of high-power microwave energy, non-kinetically destroying them. The JASSM-ER was chosen because it is an operational system, so CHAMP is to be miniaturized into the operationally relevant system.

In November 2019, the Air Force retired the AGM-86C/D air-launched cruise missile, a conventional warhead-equipped version of the nuclear-tipped ALCM, with its role replaced by the JASSM-ER.

In 2021, AGM-158A procurement was concluded in lot 16. Additionally in 2021 a contract was awarded for low-rate initial production of the AGM-158B-2 as part of Lot 19 with deliveries beginning in 2024. The AGM-158B-2 features a wing restructure, a new missile control unit, code rewritten in C++, a different paint coating, an electronic safe and arm fuse, secure GPS receiver, and program protection requirements at a unit cost of $1.6 million. Future variants are also under development, the AGM-158B-3 will further upgrade the GPS receiver with M-Code capabilities and the AGM-158D will enhance performance with new wing and chine designs, the integration of a line of sight and beyond line of sight Weapon Data Link (WDL) for post-launch retargeting capability, and software updates for increased survivability.

=== AGM-158C LRASM ===
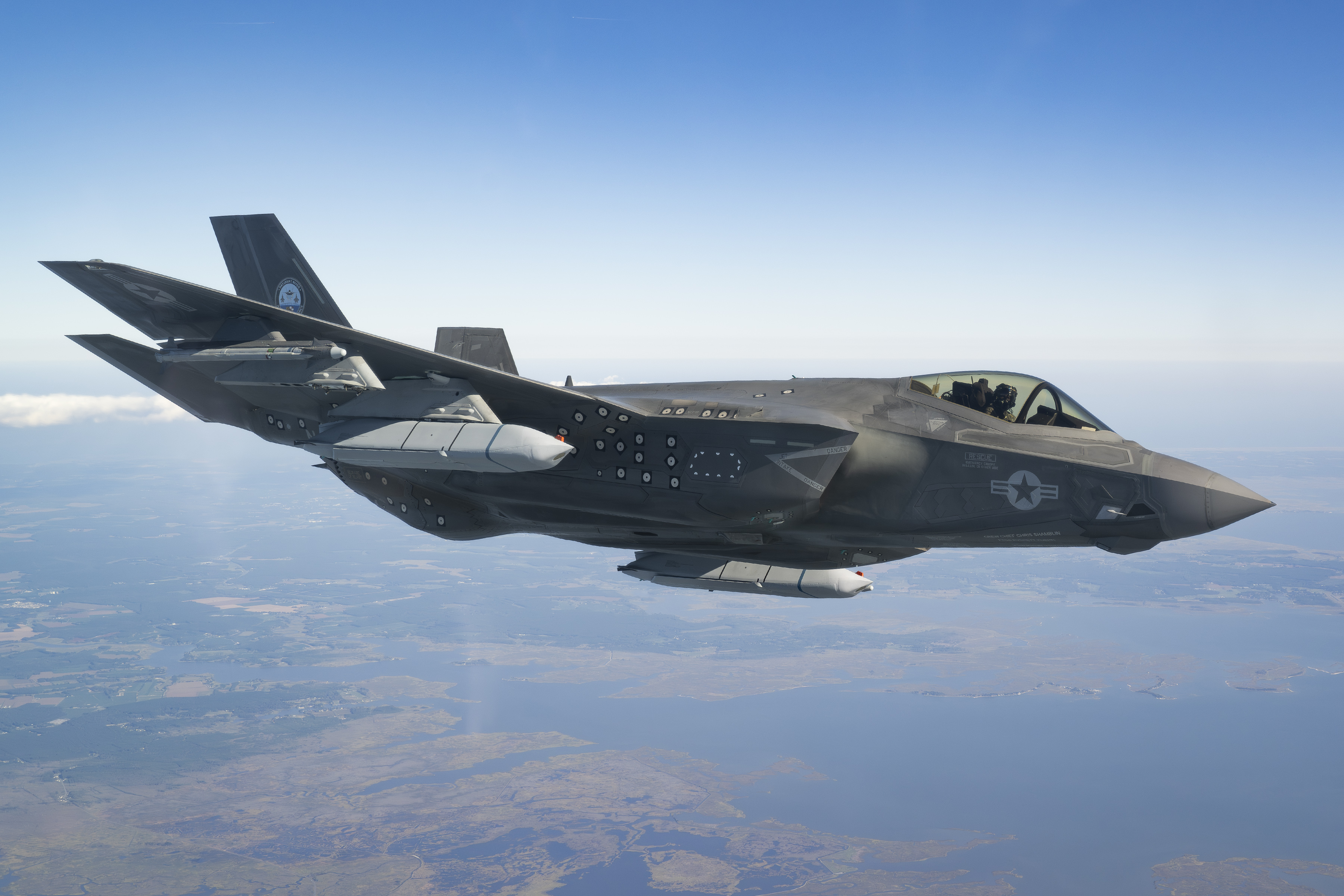
An F-35 in "Beast Mode" carrying the AGM-158C LRASM

The JASSM-ER is also the basis for AGM-158C Long Range Anti-Ship Missile, which is a JASSM-ER with a new seeker. The Air Force used the B-1 Lancer to complete a captive carry test of an LRASM to ensure the bomber can carry it, as both missiles use the same airframe. The LRASM was not originally planned to be deployed on the B-1, being intended solely as a technology demonstrator, but in February 2014 the Pentagon authorized the LRASM to be integrated onto air platforms, including the Air Force B-1, as an operational weapon to address the needs of the Navy and Air Force to have a modern anti-ship missile. In August 2015, the Navy officially designated the air-launched LRASM as AGM-158C. The LRASM achieved Early Operational Capability on the B-1B in December 2018.

=== Palletized JASSM (Rapid Dragon) ===
In 2020 and 2021, the Air Force Research Laboratory and Lockheed developed and tested Rapid Dragon, a palletized multiple AGM-158 launcher module to be airdropped by C-130 or C-17 cargo planes as a low cost method of rapidly providing a surge of mass fired JASSMs using unmodified airlift assets. This is especially useful for air forces besides the USAF who do not have dedicated bombers capable of carrying large numbers of ALCMs.

On 9 November 2022, Rapid Dragon was demonstrated off Norway in the Norwegian Sea at the Andøya Space Defense Range using a MC-130J Commando II from the 352nd Special Operations Wing (67th Special Operations Squadron), as part of Exercise Atreus.

=== AGM-158 XR ===
In 2024, Lockheed Martin unveiled a concept for a lengthened and longer range version of the AGM-158 dubbed the AGM-158 XR (eXtreme Range). The project is currently in development and is “several years out” from fielding. It can be carried on bombers and by fighters including the F-35, F-15, and F/A-18, but due to the missile's larger size and heavier weight it cannot be carried by lighter fighters like the F-16. It is speculated that the JASSM-XR's range could be around 1,000 mi (1,600 km).

== Operational history ==
The JASSM was first employed during the 14 April 2018 missile strikes against Syria during the Syrian Civil War. Two B-1 Lancers fired a total of 19 JASSMs as part of strikes against three Syrian government alleged chemical weapons targets. All 19 JASSM missiles were fired at the Barzah Research Center, which was destroyed in the strike. According to Russian state media, two missiles that failed to detonate were found by the Syrian Arab Army and transferred to Russia on 18 April for study – no evidence of this claim has been provided; initial reports had stated JASSM-ER missiles were used, but it was later clarified that baseline JASSM models were employed.

On 27 October 2019, at the end of the Barisha raid to capture or kill Abu Bakr al-Baghdadi, the then-leader of the Islamic State of Iraq and the Levant (ISIL) militant organization, a number of AGM-158B missiles were used to completely level the compound where the raid took place, marking the second time the missile has been used in combat. At least 20 AGM-158s were also used during the March–May 2025 United States attacks in Yemen.

On 3 January 2026, during the abduction of Nicolás Maduro from Venezuela, 47 JASSM-ERs were used.

Approximately 1,100 JASSM-ER missiles were expended by the U.S. during the 2026 Iran war, leaving roughly 1,500 remaining in the U.S. stockpile and representing by far the largest single combat expenditure of the weapon in its history.

== Operators ==
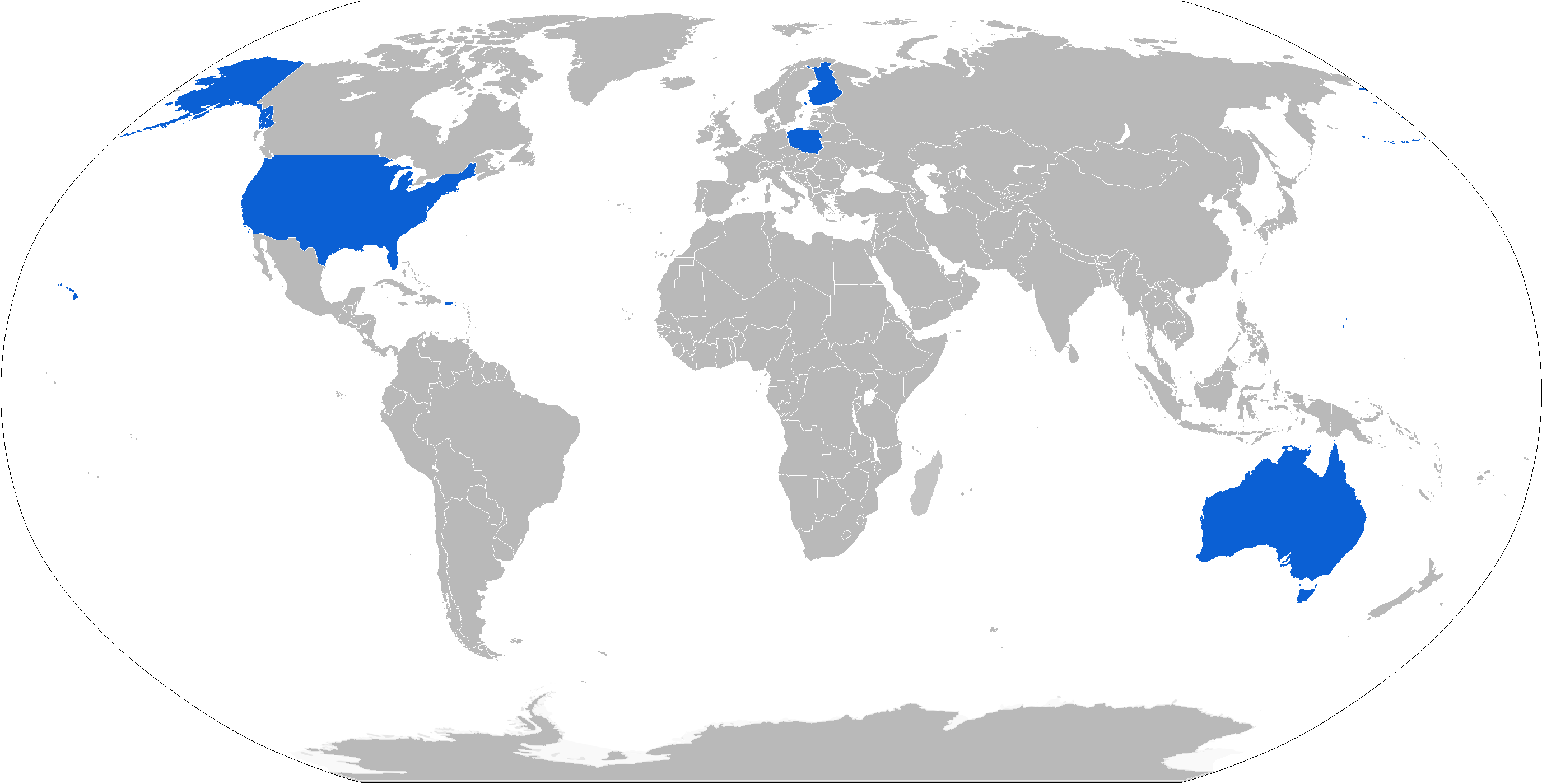
Map with AGM-158 operators in blue

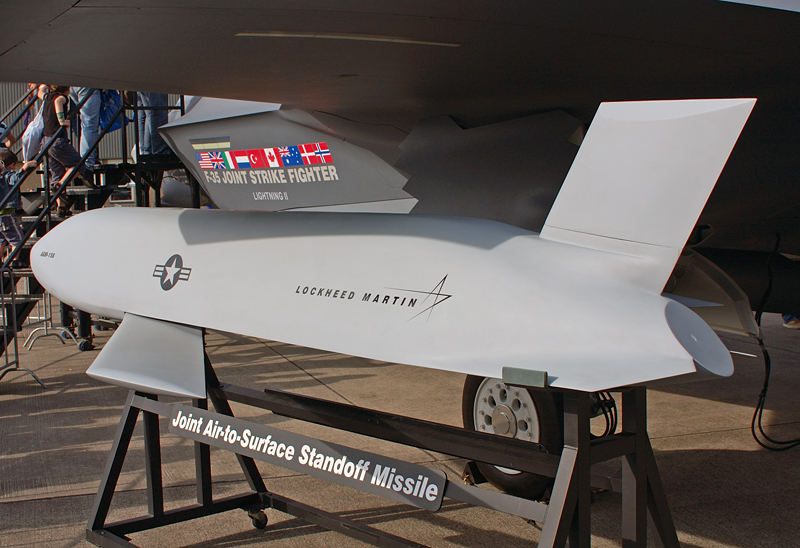
A mock-up display of the AGM-158 JASSM next to an F-35 prototype

=== Current operators ===
Australia

- Royal Australian Air Force 260 AGM-158A, 80 AGM-158B-2 delivered

Finland

- Finnish Air Force

Poland

- Polish Air Force 40 AGM-158A, 70 AGM-158B, 821 AGM-158B-2 on order

United States

- United States Air Force

=== Future operators ===
Netherlands

- Royal Netherlands Air Force 120 AGM-158B/B-2

Japan

- Japan Air Self-Defense Force - 50 AGM-158B/B-2

Italy

- Italian Air Force - requested to buy 100 JASSM-ER missiles.

Denmark

- Royal Danish Air Force - requested to buy 200 AGM-158B/B-2 missiles

=== Potential operators ===
Ukraine

- Ukrainian Air Force – In August 2024, Reuters reported that the United States was close to supplying Ukraine with JASSM missiles, but it would take "months" to deliver. The delay is due to integrating these missiles into Soviet era aircraft and pending final approval.

== See also ==
- AGM-137 TSSAM – (United States)
- AKF-98 – (China)
- KALCM Cheonryong – (South Korea)
- Storm Shadow – (France, United Kingdom)
- Saber – (United Arab Emirates)
- Taurus KEPD 350 – (Sweden, Germany)
- Ra'ad – (Pakistan)
- SOM – (Turkey)
- Wan Chien – (Taiwan)
- List of missiles
