= AGM-86 ALCM =

AGM-86
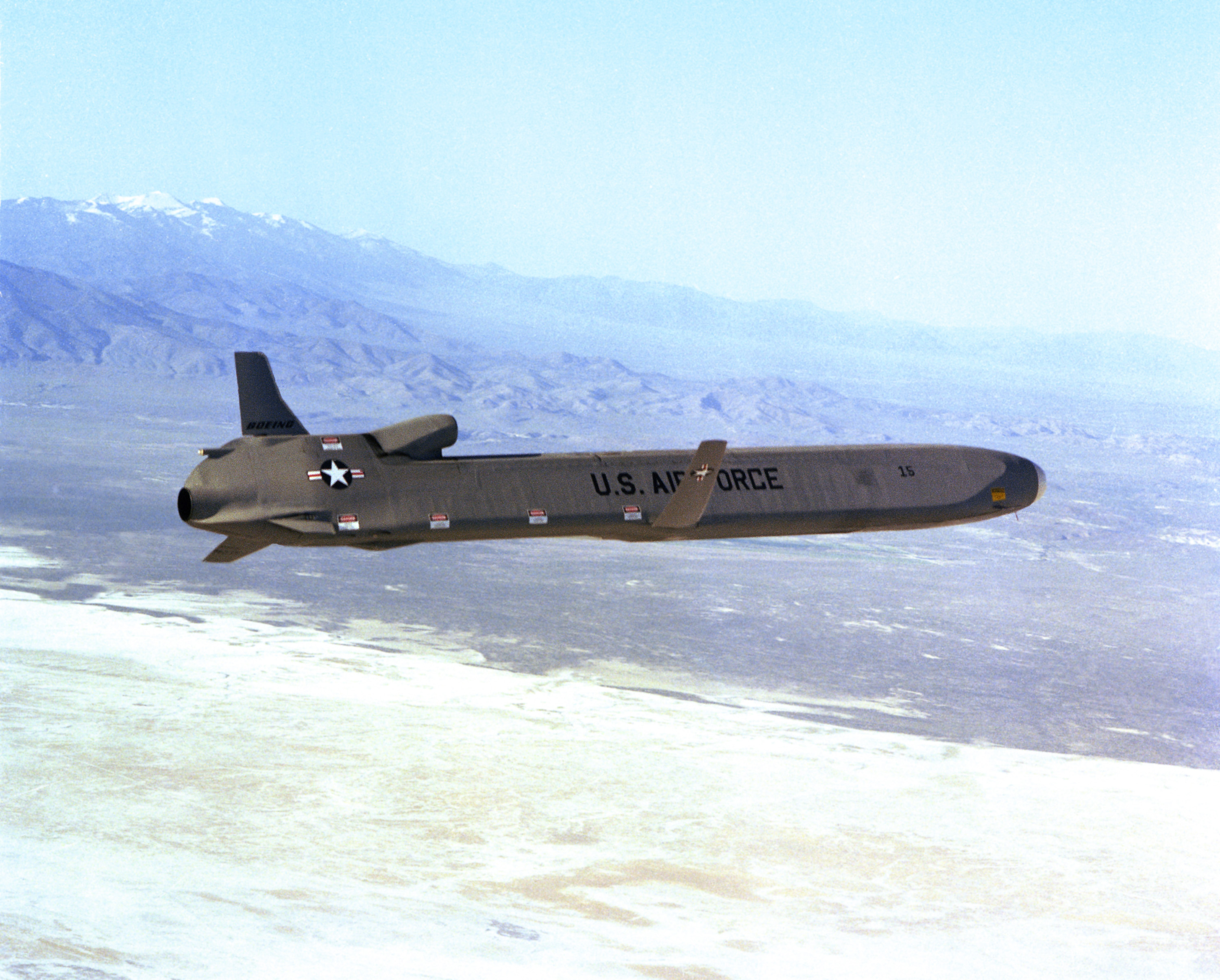
- An AGM-86C in flight
- Type: Air-to-ground strategic cruise missile
- Place of origin: United States

Service history
- In service: AGM-86B: 1982–present AGM-86C/D: retired
- Used by: United States Air Force

Production history
- Designed: 1974
- Manufacturer: Boeing Integrated Defense Systems
- Unit cost: $1 million (AGM-86B) additional $160,000 conversion cost for AGM-86C; additional $896,000 conversion cost for AGM-86D
- Produced: 1980
- No. built: 1,715 (AGM-86B); 239 (AGM-86C); 50 (AGM-86D)
- Variants: AGM-86B (1982), AGM-86C (1991), AGM-86D (2001)

Specifications
- Mass: 1,458 kg (3,214 lb) (AGM-86B); 1,750 kg (3,860 lb) (AGM-86C Block 0 and AGM-86D); 1,950 kg (4,300 lb) (AGM-86C Block 1)
- Length: 20 ft. 9 in. (6.3 m)
- Diameter: 24.5 inches (620 mm)
- Wingspan: 12 feet (3.7 m)
- Warhead: W80 thermonuclear weapon (AGM-86B), 5 or 150 kilotons Conventional warhead (AGM-86C); AUP warhead (AGM-86D)
- Warhead weight: 908kg (AGM-86C Block 0); 1362kg (AGM-86C Block 1); 1,200 lb (540 kg) class advanced unitary penetrating warhead (AGM-86D)
- Engine: Williams International; F107-WR-101 turbofan engine 600 lbf (2.7 kN) thrust
- Operational range: AGM-86B: 1,500+ mi (2,400+ km); AGM-86C: classified (nominal 680 miles, 1,100 km)
- Maximum speed: AGM-86B: 550 mph (890 km/h, Mach 0.73); AGM 86C: classified (nominal high subsonic)
- Guidance system: AGM-86B: Litton inertial navigation system element with TERCOM updates AGM 86C: Litton INS element integrated with multi-channel onboard GPS
- Launch platform: Boeing B-52H Stratofortress

The AGM-86 ALCM is an American subsonic air-launched cruise missile (ALCM) built by Boeing and operated by the United States Air Force. This missile was developed to increase the effectiveness and survivability of the Boeing B-52G and B-52H Stratofortress strategic bombers, allowing the aircraft to deliver its payload from a great distance. The missile hampers an enemy force's ability to respond and conduct air defense.

The concept started as a long-range drone aircraft that would act as a decoy, distracting Soviet air defenses from the bombers. As new lightweight nuclear weapons emerged in the 1960s, the design was modified with the intent of attacking missile and radar sites at the end of its flight. Further development extended its range so much that it emerged as a weapon allowing the B-52s to launch their attacks while still well outside Soviet airspace, saturating their defenses with hundreds of tiny, low-flying targets that were extremely difficult to see on radar.

Early tests of the missile took place between 1983-1993, during which time 23 cruise missiles were tested over northern Canada under the "Canada-U.S. Test and Evaluation Program". The goal of the program was to simulate the climate and terrain similar to that of the northern Soviet Union, and to allow the North American Aerospace Defence Command (NORAD) to develop an anti-cruise capability.

Entering service in 1982 as part of the renewed American arms buildup during the Late Cold War, the ALCM so improved the capabilities of the US bomber force that the Soviets developed new technologies to counter the weapon. Among these were airborne early warning aircraft and new weapons like the MiG-31 and Tor missile system specifically to shoot down the AGM-86. The Air Force responded with the development of the AGM-129 ACM, which included stealth capabilities. The ending of the Cold War led to cutbacks in this program, and its expensive maintenance eventually resulted in it being abandoned in favor of life extensions to the original ALCM.

Examples of the AGM-86A and AGM-86B are on display at the Steven F. Udvar-Hazy Center of the National Air and Space Museum, near Washington, D.C.

== History ==
=== Quail ===
The ALCM traces its history to the ADM-20 Quail missile, which began development in February 1956. Quail was the ultimate outcome of several similar programs to develop a small decoy aircraft that would be launched from bombers during their approach to targets, presenting false targets to saturate the defenses and allow the bombers to escape an attack. The small jet-powered drone aircraft had a simple inertial navigation system (INS) that allowed it to fly a pre-programmed course that would make it visible to known Soviet defensive sites. A number of radar jammers and radar reflectors were intended to make it appear like a B-52 on a radar display.

Quail was designed in the mid-1950s when the normal attack profile for a strategic bomber was to fly as high and fast as possible to reduce the time the defenders had to respond to the aircraft before it flew out of range. This was effective against interceptor aircraft but of little use against surface-to-air missiles (SAMs), whose attack times were measured in seconds.

This led to the adoption of low-level attacks, where the bombers would fly below the radar horizon so they could not be seen on ground-based radars. Quail, originally designed for the high-altitude mission, was modified with the addition of a barometric altimeter to allow it to fly at lower altitudes. Doing so seriously limited its effective range and flight time. In the early 1960s, the Air Force began to question the usefulness of Quail in the face of improving Soviet defenses.

=== SRAM ===
Looking for another solution to the Soviet SAM problem, in 1964 the Air Force began developing a new system that would directly attack the missile sites rather than confuse them. This emerged as the AGM-69 SRAM, with a range of about 50 nautical miles (93 km; 58 mi), allowing it to be launched from outside the roughly 20 nautical miles (37 km; 23 mi) range of the SA-2 Guideline missiles it faced. Flying at Mach 3, it quickly flew out in front of the bombers, reaching the missile site before the bomber flew into the range of the SA-2.

While highly capable against known missile locations, SRAM could do nothing to defend against unknown sites, nor help with the problem of interceptor aircraft. To deal with these threats, Quail continued to be carried, typically in pairs, providing some defense against these other threats. However, by the late 1960s the Air Force concluded "that the Quail was only slightly better than nothing."

=== SCAD ===
In January 1968, a new requirement emerged for a modern version of Quail for this new mission, the Subsonic Cruise Aircraft Decoy, or SCAD. SCAD was designed specifically to fit onto the same rotary launcher used by SRAM, allowing a single aircraft to carry multiple SRAM and SCAD and launch either at any time. This led to it being the same 14 foot (4.3 m) length as SRAM, and the use of a fuselage with a triangular cross-section, which maximized the usable volume on the rotary launchers. The system was otherwise similar to Quail, using a simple inertial navigation system (INS) allowing the missile to fly a pre-programmed course.

Soon after development began, it was noted that the very small nuclear warheads being developed at that time could be fit to SCAD without seriously affecting its performance as a decoy. This would allow it to act as a decoy for much of its flight, and then deliberately approach a selected defensive site and attack it. As such, the program was renamed Subsonic Cruise Armed Decoy, retaining the SCAD acronym.

For this role, the accuracy of the original INS guidance hardware was not enough. While a similar system was also used in SRAM, its shorter range and much shorter flight times meant the drift rate of the system was not a serious concern as long as the bomber could feed it accurate information just before launch, to "zero out" the drift. In contrast, SCAD was designed to fly over much longer ranges and slower speeds, resulting in longer flight times and increasing the problem with drift; even with the drift "zeroed out" just before launch, subsequent drift during the longer flight would accumulate to an unacceptable error. To provide the accuracy needed to attack the SAM sites with a small warhead, some system was needed to zero out the drift in-flight, and for this need, a radar-based TERCOM system was added.

Development was approved in July 1970, and it was given the designation ZAGM-86A, the Z indicating its initial development status.

=== ALCM ===
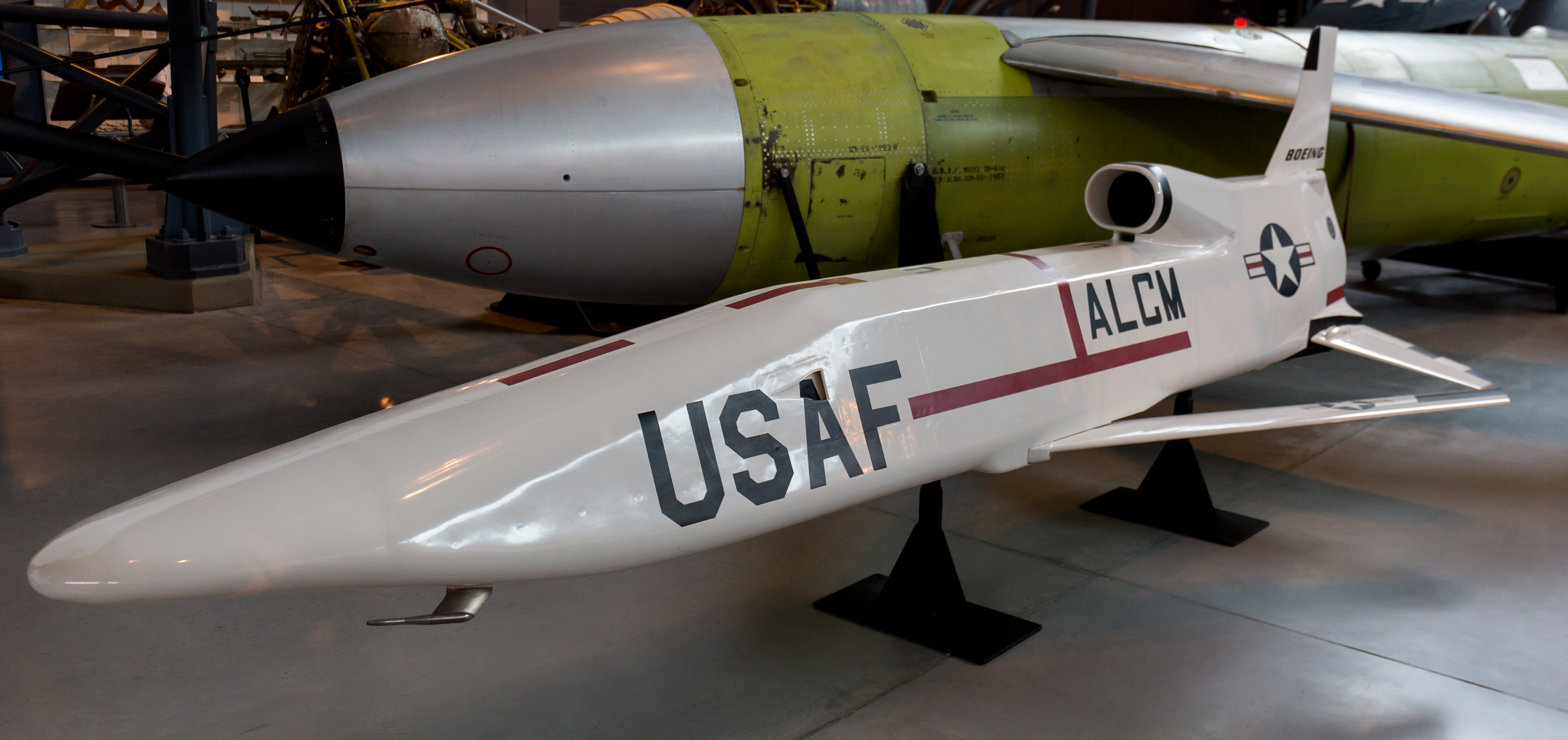
The original ALCM was much smaller than later models, and had a pointed nose profile.

As SCAD moved from the pure-decoy role to decoy-and-attack, this meant it would be able to carry out the same mission as SRAM, but from much longer range. This would reduce the need for a decoy. Accordingly, in June 1973, SCAD was canceled in favor of a system dedicated purely to the long-range attack mission. The original designation number remained, but the name changed to reflect the new mission, becoming the Air Launched Cruise Missile, or ALCM.

The first example, similar to the original SCAD in most ways, flew for the first time in March 1976, and its new guidance system was first tested that September. In January 1977, the missile was ordered into full-scale production. Compared to the models that entered service in the 1980s, the A-model had a distinctive look; the nose tapered sharply to a triangular point giving it a shark-like appearance, compared to the later models which had a more rounded conventional appearance.

=== ERV and JCMP ===
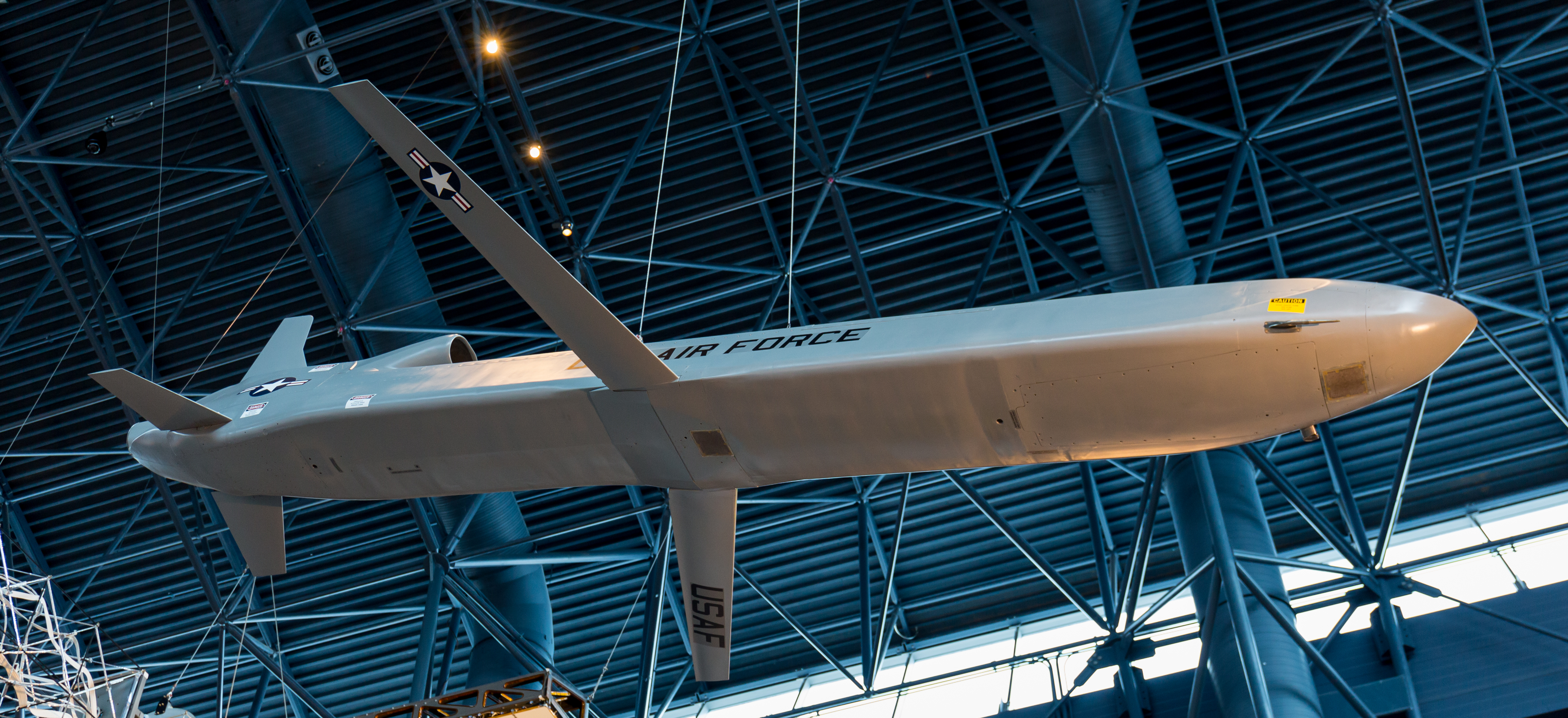
The fuselage stretch for the ERV is evident in Udvar-Hazy Center's AGM-86B.

Meanwhile, the Air Force had also issued a requirement for a version with a much longer 1,500 nautical miles (2,800 km; 1,700 mi) range. This would allow the bombers to launch their missiles from far off the Russian coast, placing it outside the range of the interceptors as well. To reach the intended range, this new Extended Range Version (ERV) would have to be lengthened to contain more fuel, or external fuel tanks would have to be added. Either change would make it too large to fit on the SRAM launchers and the extended-fuselage version would be too large to fit in the bomb bay of the new B-1 Lancer bomber. The Air Force intended to replace the original ALCM with the new version at some future date.

The Navy was also in the midst of its own cruise missile project, the Sea-Launched Cruise Missile (SLCM), which ultimately emerged as the BGM-109 Tomahawk, which was similar to ALCM in many ways. In 1977, the Air Force and Navy were ordered to collaborate under the "Joint Cruise Missile Project", JCMP, with the intention of using as many parts in common as possible. After considering the two designs, the Air Force agreed to modify the ALCM with the SLCM's McDonnell Douglas AN/DPW-23 TERCOM system, as well as using its Williams F107 turbofan engine.

While the JCMP program was taking place, the B-1 was canceled. This eliminated the need for ALCM to fit in the B-1's bomb bay, and the length limitations that implied. The Air Force decided to cancel production of the A-model ALCM, and replace it with either an air-launched version of the SLCM, or the ERV. The ERV flew in August 1979, and was declared the winner of the head-to-head fly-off against the SLCM in March 1980.

=== Initial production ===
Production of the initial 225 AGM-86B missiles began in fiscal year 1980. The AGM-86B reached operational status in December 1982, on the B-52G with the 416th Bombardment Wing / 668th Bombardment Squadron, Griffiss Air Force Base, New York. Eventually, the missile was deployed across the entire B-52G and B-52H fleet throughout Strategic Air Command. Integration and successful flight testing did occur with the B-1B (involving moving the bulkhead between the forward and intermediate stores bay forward one position) - however the AGM-86 was never operationally deployed on the B-1. Production of a total 1,715 missiles was completed in October 1986. More than 100 launches have taken place since then, with a 90% approximate success rate.

=== CALCM ===
In June 1986 a limited number of AGM-86B missiles were converted to carry a high-explosive blast/fragmentation warhead and an internal GPS. They were redesignated as the AGM-86C CALCM (Conventional Air-Launched Cruise Missile). This modification also replaced the B model's TERCOM and integrated a GPS capability with the existing inertial navigation system computer .

In 1996 and 1997, 200 additional CALCMs were produced from excess ALCMs. These missiles, designated Block I, incorporate improvements such as a larger and improved conventional payload (1,360 kg, 3,000 lb blast class), a multi-channel GPS receiver and integration of the buffer box into the GPS receiver. The upgraded avionics package was retrofitted into all existing CALCM (Block 0) so all AGM-86C missiles are electronically identical. A total of 622 missiles were converted.

== Design ==
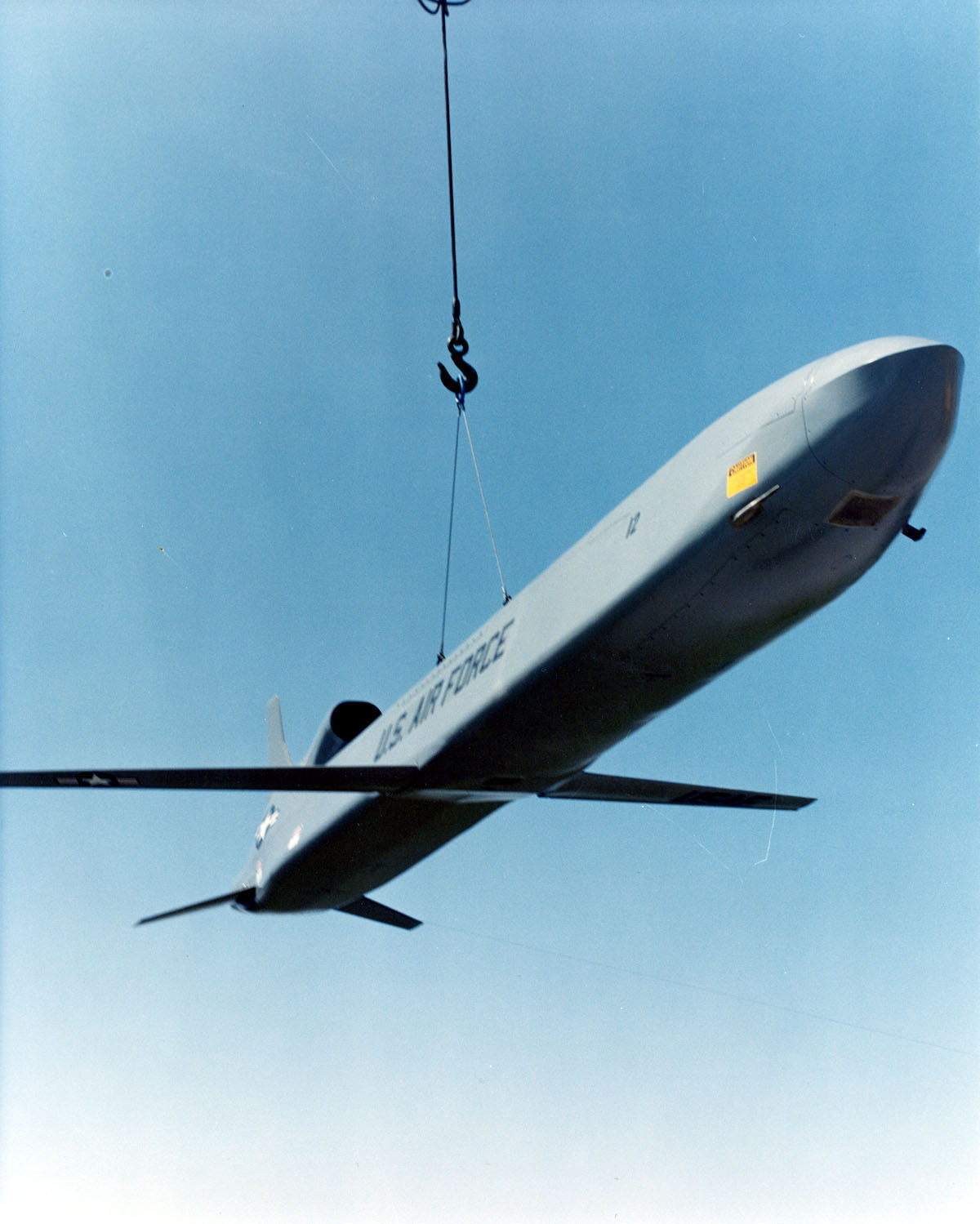
Up to 20 AGM-86B missiles could be loaded onto one B-52 bomber.

All variants of the AGM-86 missile are powered by a Williams F107 turbofan jet engine that propels it at sustained subsonic speeds and can be launched from aircraft at both high and low altitudes. The missile deploys its folded wings, tail surfaces and engine inlet after launch.

AGM-86B/C/D missiles increase flexibility in target selection. AGM-86B missiles can be air-launched in large numbers by the bomber force. B-52H bombers carry six AGM-86B or AGM-86C missiles on each of two externally mounted pylons and eight internally on a rotary launcher, giving the B-52H a maximum capacity of 20 missiles per aircraft.

An enemy force would have to counterattack each of the missiles individually, making defense against them costly and complicated. The enemy's defenses are further hampered by the missiles' small size and low-altitude flight capability, which makes them difficult to detect on radar.

=== AGM-86B ===
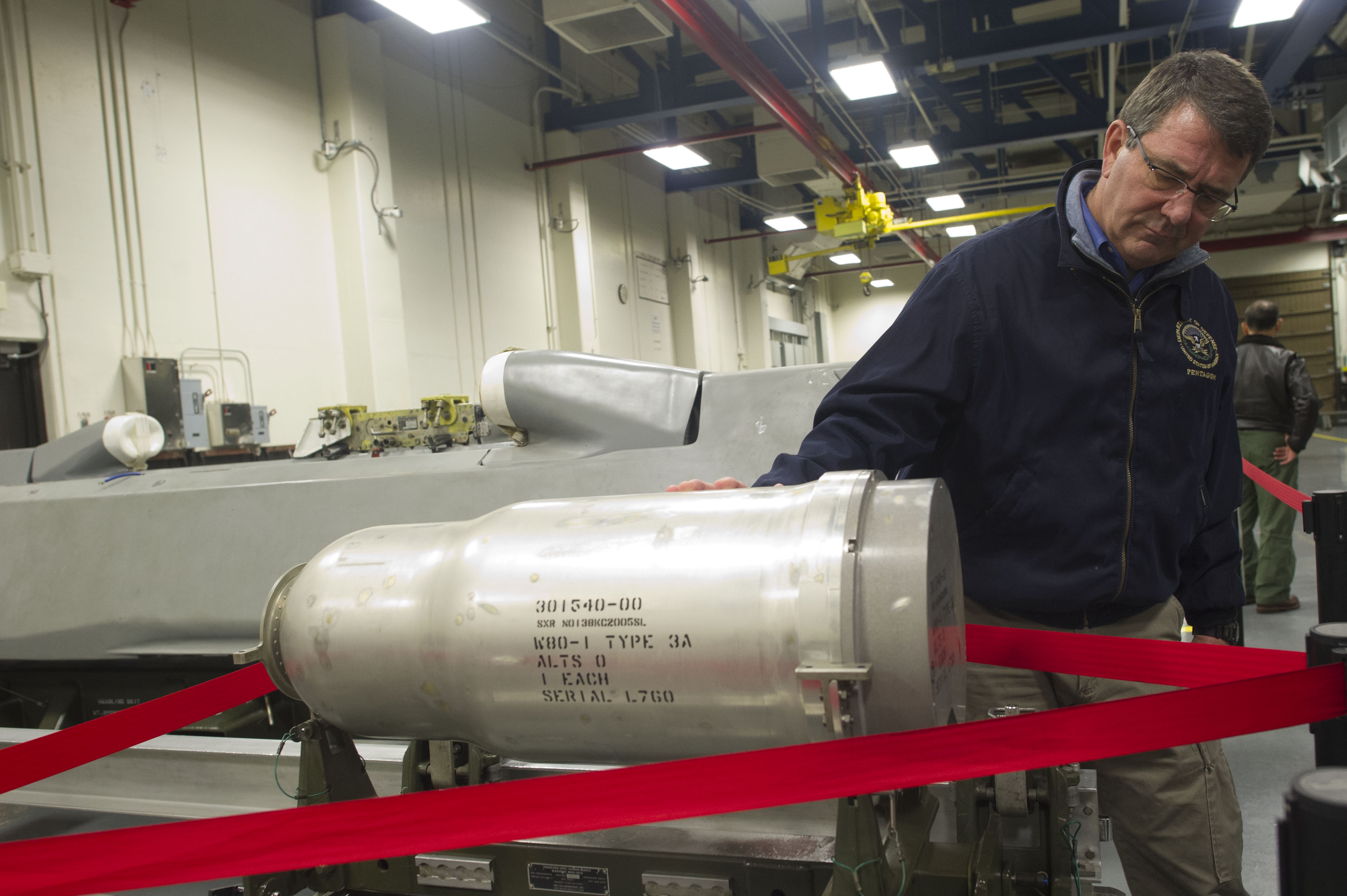
W80 warhead with AGM-86B missiles behind Secretary of Defense

The nuclear armed AGM-86B uses a terrain contour-matching guidance system (TERCOM) to fly to its assigned target. It can carry a single W80 thermonuclear warhead, with a yield of 5 or 150 kilotons. A modified variant of the B61, it was mainly designed for use on ground and air-launched cruise missiles.

=== AGM-86C/D ===
The AGM-86C/D CALCM carries a conventional high-explosive payload rather than a thermonuclear payload. This is a fragmentation warhead in the AGM-86C and a unitary penetrating warhead in the AGM-86D. The AGM-86C/D uses an onboard Global Positioning System (GPS) coupled with its inertial navigation system (INS) to navigate in flight. This allows the missile to guide itself to the target with pinpoint accuracy. Litton Guidance and Control, and Interstate Electronics Corporation (one of the companies acquired by L3Harris) were the guidance contractors for the C model.

== Operations ==
The CALCM became operational in January 1991 at the onset of Operation Desert Storm. Seven B-52Gs from Barksdale AFB launched 35 missiles at designated launch points in the U.S. Central Command's area of responsibility to attack high-priority targets in Iraq. These "round-robin" missions marked the beginning of the operation's Air Force component and were the longest known aircraft combat sorties in history at the time (more than 14,000 miles (23,000 km) and 35 hours of flight).

CALCM's next employment occurred in September 1996 during Operation Desert Strike. In response to Iraq's continued hostilities against the Kurds in northern Iraq, the Air Force launched 13 CALCMs in a joint attack with the Navy. This mission has put the CALCM program in the spotlight for future modifications. Operation Desert Strike was also the combat debut of the B-52H and the carriage of the CALCM on the weapons bay-mounted Common Strategic Rotary Launcher (CSRL). During the Operation Desert Storm, the CALCM had been carried on the B-52G and wing-mounted pylons.

The CALCM was also used in Operation Desert Fox in 1998, Operation Allied Force in 1999, and Operation Iraqi Freedom in 2003. Operation Iraqi Freedom was also the combat debut of the AGM-86D, a further development of the missile which replaced the blast/fragmentation warhead of the AGM-86C with a penetrating warhead.

== Future of the ALCM ==
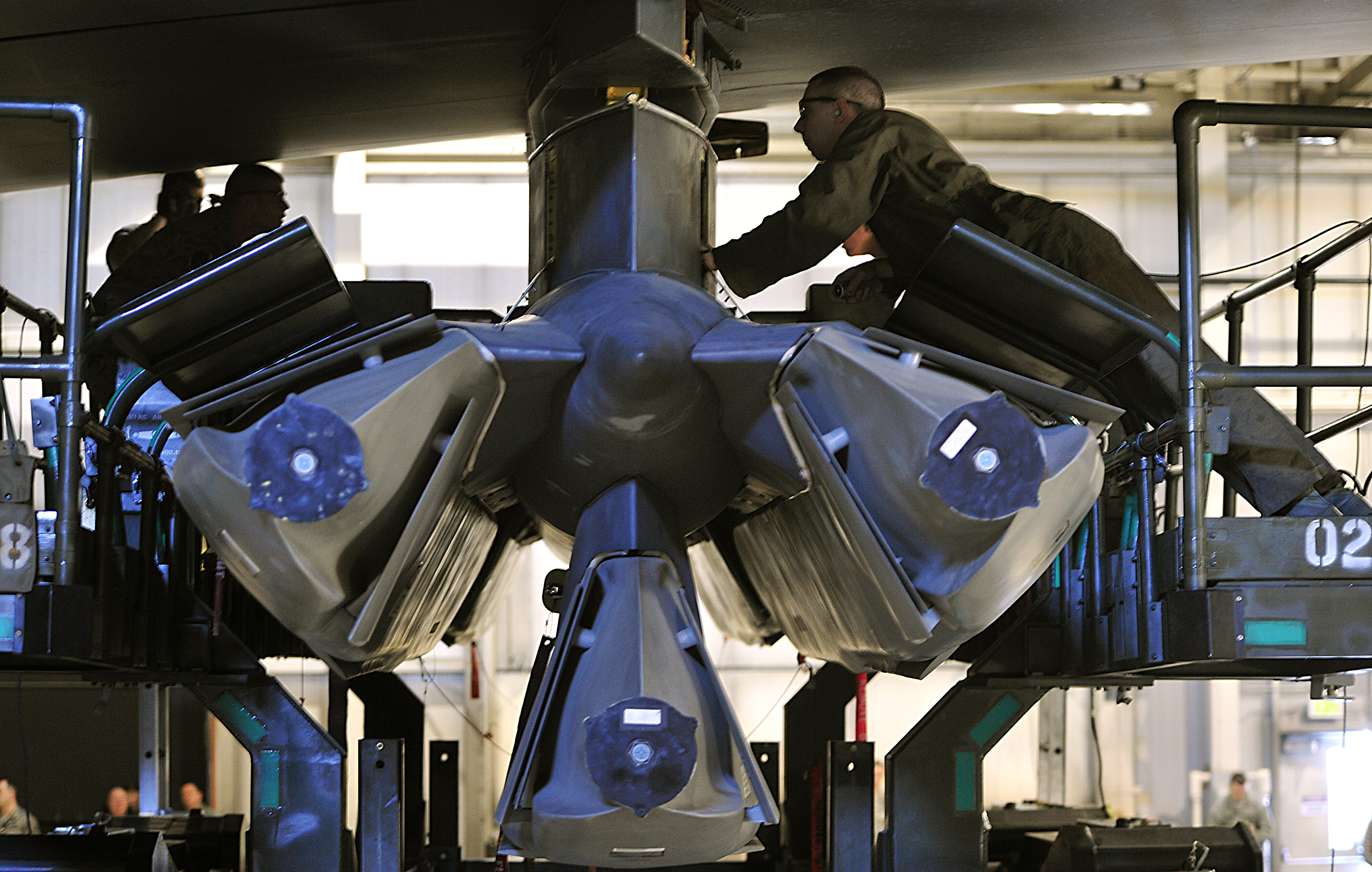
Loading six AGM-86 ALCMs on a B-52 at Minot Air Force Base

In 2007 the USAF announced its intention to retire all of its AGM-129 ACMs and to reduce the ALCM fleet by more than 500 missiles, leaving 528 nuclear cruise missiles. The ALCM force will be consolidated at Minot Air Force Base, North Dakota, and all excess cruise missile bodies will be destroyed. The reductions are a result of the Strategic Offensive Reductions Treaty requirement to go below 2,200 deployed nuclear weapons by 2012, with the AGM-129 ACM chosen for disposal because it has reliability problems and high maintenance costs.

Even with the SLEP (service life extension program), the remaining AGM-86s were to reach their end of service by 2020, leaving the B-52 without a nuclear mission. However, in 2012, the USAF announced plans to extend the useful life of the missiles until at least 2030.

To replace the ALCM, the USAF planned to award a contract for the development of the new Long-Range Stand-Off (LRSO) weapon in 2015. Unlike the AGM-86, the LRSO will be carried on multiple aircraft, including the B-52, the B-2 Spirit, and the Northrop Grumman B-21. Like the AGM-86, the LRSO can be armed with either a conventional or nuclear warhead. The LRSO program is to develop a weapon that can penetrate and survive integrated air defense systems and prosecute strategic targets. Both conventional and nuclear versions of the weapon are required to reach initial operational capability (IOC) before the retirement of their respective ALCM versions, around 2030.

The technology development contracts were to be submitted before the end of 2012. In March 2014 a further three-year delay in the project was announced by the Department of Defense, delaying a contract award until fiscal year 2018. The House Armed Services Committee moved to reject this delay. The delay was caused by financial pressures and an uncertain acquisition plan, and allowed by the long remaining service life left for the AGM-86 and lack of urgent necessity compared to other defense needs.

As of August 24, 2017, the Department of Defense has awarded both Lockheed Martin and Raytheon Corporations with $900 million ($1.18 billion in 2025) to develop the LRSO. Contracts end in 2022, when the Department of Defense will select one design to continue further developments.

The CALCM was retired on 20 November 2019, replaced in the conventional standoff strike role by the AGM-158B JASSM-ER.

== See also ==
- AGM-154
- FP-5 Flamingo
