= Dynetics X-61 Gremlins =

American experimental UAV

X-61 Gremlins
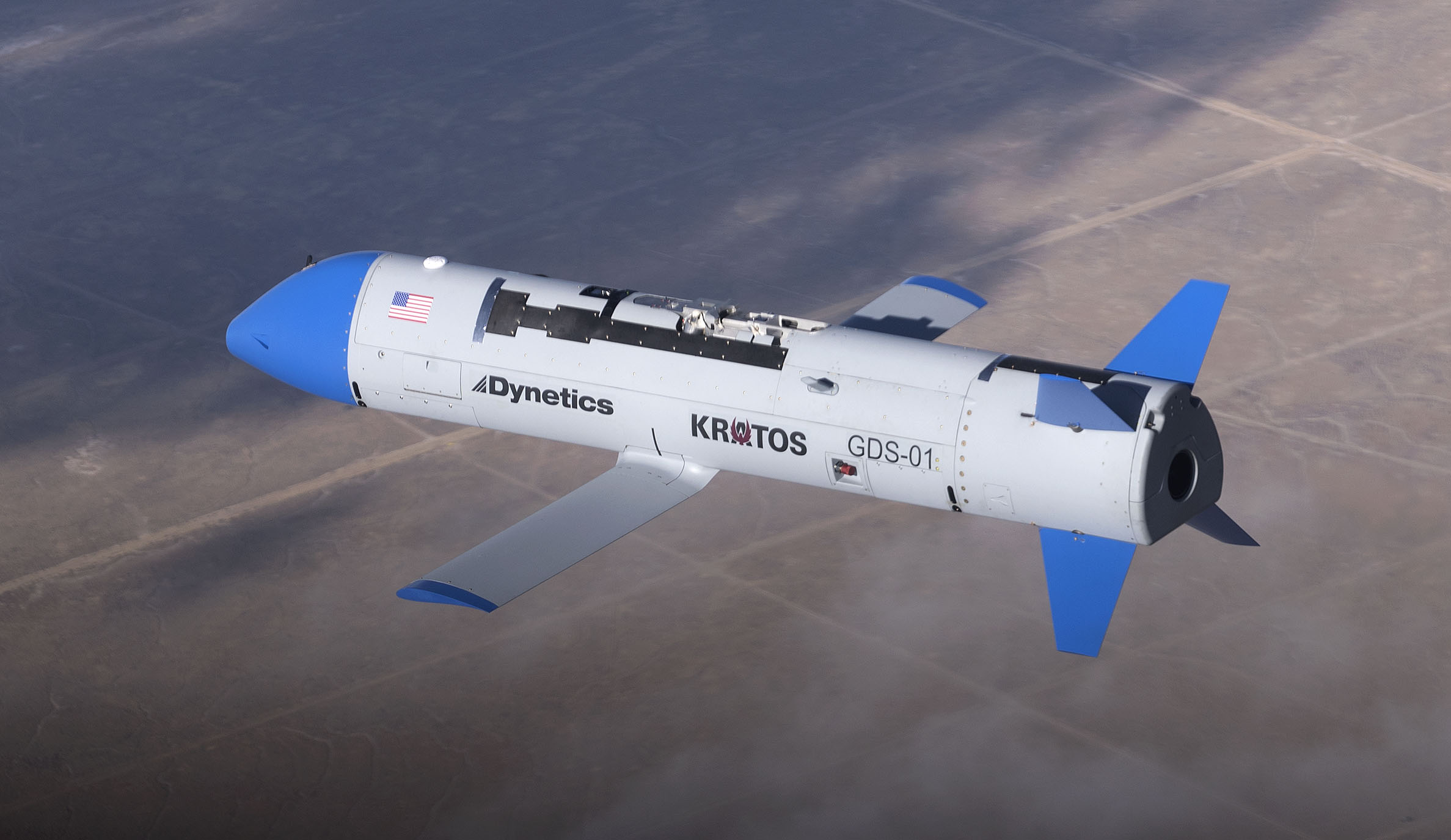
- X-61A in flight

General information
- Type: Experimental unmanned aerial vehicle
- National origin: United States
- Manufacturer: Dynetics
- Primary user: DARPA
- Number built: 5

History
- Manufactured: 2019–present
- Introduction date: 2019
- First flight: November 2019 (captive); January 17, 2020 (free flight)

The Dynetics X-61 Gremlins is an experimental unmanned aerial vehicle designed by Dynetics.

== Design and development ==
The X-61 stemmed from the DARPA Gremlins program to demonstrate a recoverable, low-cost UAV with digital flight controls and navigation systems. It is designed to be recovered in midair by a modified transport airplane following its mission. Dynetics was one of four companies to be awarded a Phase I contract for the program in 2016, and was the winner of the Phase III contract in April 2018.

The X-61A is powered by a Williams F107 turbofan engine and can carry a variety of payloads, including electro-optical sensors, infrared imagers, electronic warfare systems, and weapons. It was designed to be compatible with existing launch and ground support equipment. The UAV is semi-autonomous, allowing a controller either in the mothership or on the ground to control up to eight X-61As at one time.

== Operational history ==
As of January 2020, five X-61A Gremlins have been built. On July 5, 2019, an earthquake near China Lake damaged some of the first X-61A's test equipment, delaying the program. The first captive flight of the X-61A on board a Lockheed C-130A Hercules mother ship was in November 2019.

The first free flight of the X-61A was conducted on January 17, 2020. The flight was successful, however, the main parachute failed to deploy during the recovery and the aircraft was lost. The four remaining vehicles are still operational.

In August 2020 the company announced they had completed a second test flight, this time successfully recovering the aircraft by parachute. The flight lasted over two hours and included rendezvous and formation flight with the C-130 mother ship.

In October 2021 DARPA announced that a specially equipped C-130 Hercules cargo plane had successfully recovered an X-61A from mid-air.

== Specifications ==
Data from Airforce Technology and Flight Global

General characteristics

- Capacity: 65.7 kg
- Length: 13 ft 9 in (4.2 m)
- Wingspan: 11 ft 5 in (3.47 m)
- Width: 1 ft 10 in (0.57 m)
- Height: 1 ft 8 in (0.52 m)
- Gross weight: 1,499 lb (680 kg)
- Powerplant: 1 × Williams F107 turbofan engine, 700 lbf (3.1 kN) thrust

Performance

- Maximum speed: Mach 0.6
- Range: 350 mi (560 km, 300 nmi)

== See also ==
Aircraft of comparable role, configuration, and era

- Ryan Firebee - another unmanned aircraft intended to be both launched and recovered in flight

Related lists

- List of X-planes
