= AGM-84E Standoff Land Attack Missile =

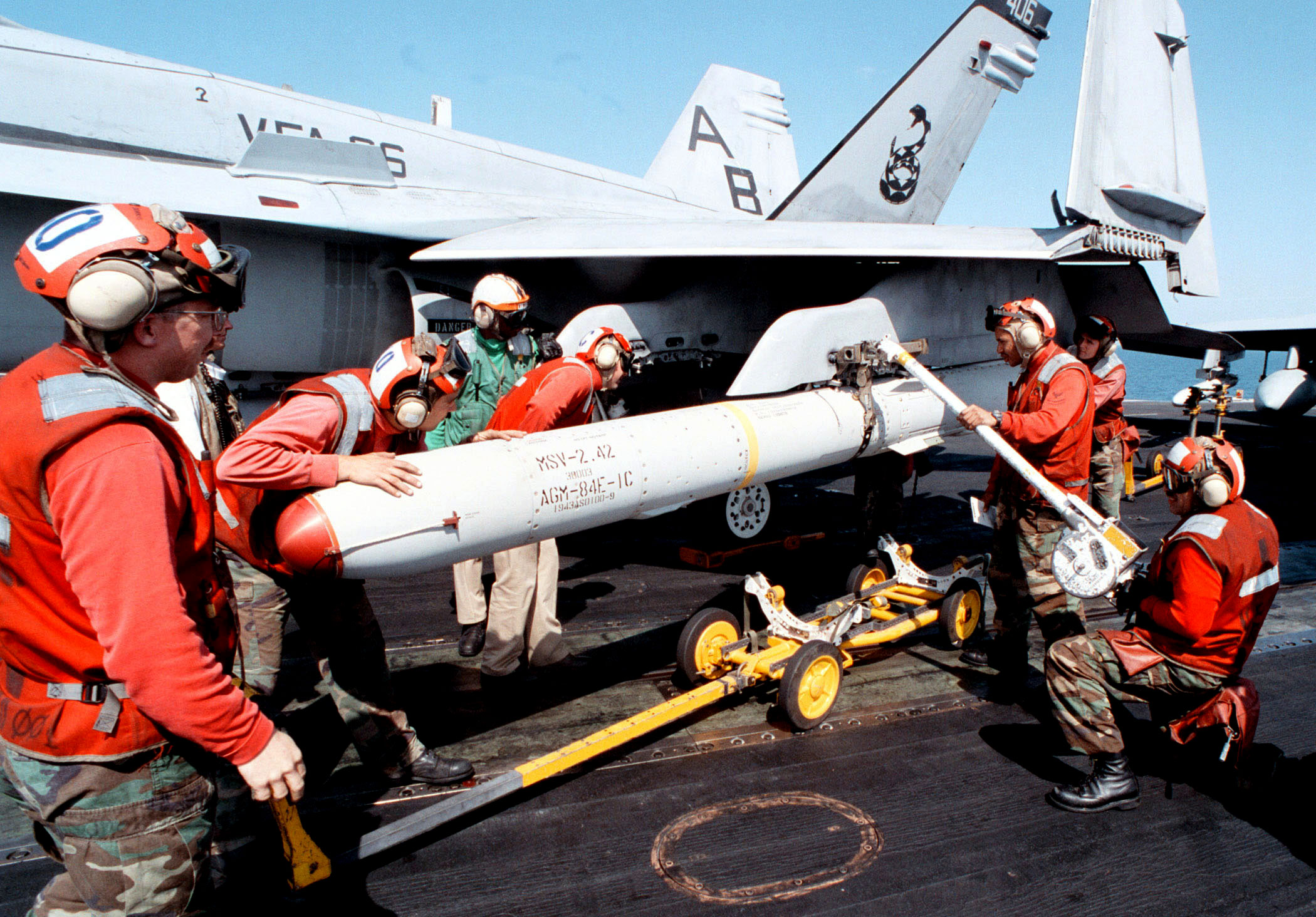
- An AGM-84E Standoff Land-Attack Missile being loaded onto an F/A-18C Hornet
- Type: Air-launched cruise missile
- Place of origin: United States

Service history
- In service: 1990-2000
- Used by: U.S. Navy
- Wars: Gulf War, Bosnian War

Production history
- Designer: McDonnell Douglas
- Manufacturer: McDonnell Douglas
- Unit cost: $720,000
- Produced: 1991 – 1995

Specifications
- Mass: 627 kg (1,382 lb)
- Length: 4.50 m (14.8 ft)
- Diameter: 34.3 cm (13.5 in)
- Wingspan: 91.4 cm (3.00 ft)
- Engine: Teledyne CAE J402-CA-400 turbojet
- Operational range: >60 nmi (110 km; 69 mi)
- Maximum speed: 855 km/h (530 mph, 0.698 Mach)
- Guidance system: Inertial navigation system Global Positioning System; Infrared homing Datalink to the controlling aircraft
- Launch platform: Current: P-3 Orion; Past: F/A-18C Hornet, S-3B Viking, A-6E SWIP Intruder

The AGM-84E SLAM (Standoff Land Attack Missile) was a subsonic, over-the-horizon air-launched cruise missile that was developed by McDonnell Douglas from the AGM-84 Harpoon anti-ship missile. The SLAM was designed to provide all-weather, day and night, precision attack capabilities against stationary high-value targets as well as ships in port.

== Design ==
Except for new technologies in the guidance and seeker sections, which included a Global Positioning System receiver, a modified AGM-65F Maverick missile IIR Seeker, and a modified Walleye datalink, all of the missile hardware came directly from the Harpoon missile. SLAM missile uses an inertial navigation system, which is supplemented by Global Positioning System (GPS) input, and it also uses infrared homing terminal guidance. It could also be guided by any aircraft carrying the AN/AWW-9B and AN/AWW-13 datalink pods. The missile however was unable to avoid terrain, meaning that to attack a target, there had to be no obstacles in the path of the missile.

== Deployment in the Gulf War ==
Developed in 48 months, three SLAMs were successfully employed during the Persian Gulf War, when they were used to strike Iraqi targets. These strikes, made exclusively by the few A-6E SWIP Intruders assigned to VA-75 on the USS John F. Kennedy (CV-67), were before official operational testing of the new missile had begun. Only five SLAMs were carried to the war, all on the Kennedy. They had also been only been recently moved to carrier.

The first time the SLAM was used in combat came on January 18, 1991, when two SLAMs, fired two minutes apart, were launched by an A-6E SWIP Intruder from VA-75 towards a Hydro-electric plant north of Baghdad on the Tigris River, specifically the power house and turbines. This plant was targeted because it powered the Al-Qa'im superphosphate fertilizer plant (nicknamed 'Big Al'), known to produce yellowcake for uranium enrichment. The SLAMs were guided by an A-7E Corsair II from VA-72 (also from the Kennedy) via the use of a Datalink pod.

Although GPS guidance could have done the job without the need of the Corsair II, the Navy need the Corsair II to allow the first SLAM to blast a hole, allowing the 2nd SLAM to fly through the hole and cause damage. The last SLAM used in the war was fired that same night against a dam known to generate electricity near Al Qa'im. The dam was reportedly disabled with that single hit. The strike itself was also successful in that it enabled the Intruder to attack without entering the Missile Engagement Zone of Al-Qa'im.

== 1990s and retirement ==
Several months after the Gulf War, the SLAM was officially approved for full production on June 28, 1991.

The SLAM was also used during NATO airstrikes in Bosnia during operations Deny Fly (1993-1995) and Deliberate Force (1995). An F/A-18C (N) Hornet from VFA-151 (Note: VFA-151 had the Night Attack Hornet in 1999.) in February 1999 tested the SLAM's special GPS only guidance mode against a simulated SA-10 radar van in a target complex located on San Nicolas Island.

In the year 2000, the SLAM was replaced in service by the AGM-84H SLAM-ER (Standoff Land Attack Missile Expanded Response), which had numerous new capabilities including increased target penetration and nearly twice the range of the older AGM-84E SLAM.

== See also ==
- AGM-84H/K SLAM-ER
- BGM-109 Tomahawk Cruise Missile
- AGM-84 Harpoon anti-ship missile
