= Teledyne CAE J402 =

Turbojet engine

J402
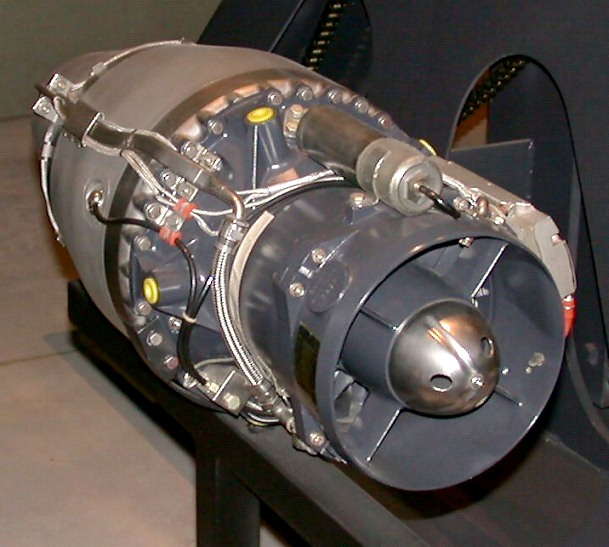
- Teledyne CAE J402-CA-400
- Type: Turbojet
- National origin: United States
- Manufacturer: Teledyne CAE
- First run: August 1974 (first qualified)
- Major applications: Harpoon; AGM-158 JASSM
- Developed from: Teledyne CAE J69

The Teledyne CAE J402 is an American small turbojet engine. Several variants have been developed to power unmanned air vehicles such as missiles and target drones. Developed in the 1970s for the Harpoon anti-ship missile, the J402 was the first jet engine to be designed as a "wooden round", meaning that the engine had to be able to sit for long periods without maintenance or inspection and work right away.

== Development and design ==
The J402 engine was designed for the Harpoon missile from the beginning. Its size and weight were dictated by the already-planned missile (just over 12 inches (30 cm) in diameter, about 100 lb (45 kg) in weight). The engine also had to be designed to be inexpensive; the military wanted to produce and store large quantities of the missile. To meet these requirements, Teledyne aerodynamically scaled their J69-T-406 turbojet to just 32% air capacity. This brought thrust and size down to the desired levels.

The J402-CA-400, the original Harpoon variant, was qualified in 1974 and proved to be extremely reliable, failing only twice in 131 flights through mid 1980. The J402-powered Harpoon had an excellent service record, including sinking two Libyan warships during the 1986 Gulf of Sidra incident. Through 1988, the oldest J402 engine fired in a Harpoon was over eleven years old, exceeding the original five year "wooden round" requirement.

The J402-CA-400 was a single-shaft engine, with one axial compressor stage and one centrifugal compressor stage. The compressed air was combusted in an annular combustor, and then passed through a single high-pressure turbine stage before being exhausted. Because the engine was designed for a one-time use missile, its service life was only one hour. The primary challenge of the "wooden round" requirement was to design the engine to be as reliable as possible. To that end, significant efforts were made to reduce the number of individual parts throughout the engine. For example, the rotor system of the J402 had 16 parts, while the J69 (the parent engine) had 149 parts for the same system. Another simplifying measure was to eliminate the standard gearbox. All the engine accessories, like the fuel pump and electrical alternator, ran directly off the rotor shaft. Engine starting was another reliability-critical function of the engine, and to accomplish that requirement, the J402 utilizes pyrotechnic cartridges to start the engine. Finally, the engine was among the first to feature a fully electronic analog fuel controller.

Soon after development of the -400 variant for the Harpoon began, Teledyne began work on a new variant, the J402-CA-700 for the new MQM-107 Streaker aerial target drone. These target drones were not "one-time-use" vehicles like the Harpoon missiles were, so the lifetime of the engine had to be extended from one hour to 15 hours. To accomplish this, the turbine temperature was reduced, as well as the rotational speeds. A new starter system was included to give the engine the ability to restart. The result was an engine that was slightly less powerful, at 640 lbf (2.8 kN) versus the -400's 660 lbf (2.9 kN), but had the required service life.

An additional variant, the J402-CA-702, was developed internally by the company. This variant added an additional axial compressor stage (bringing the total to two axial stages), which increased the engine length by only 4 in (10 cm), yet increased the thrust to 970 lbf (4.3 kN). The engine was later selected to power the MQM-107D, an improved version of the target drone. The addition of additional compressor stage increased the pressure ratio and overall airflow through the engine, and necessitated the development of a new turbine section. Teledyne designed and tested the new two stage axial compressor early in the J402's life (mid 1970s), but did not work on the new turbine (and subsequently the -702 variant of the engine) until nearly a decade later in the mid-1980s. The resulting engine was 45% more power than the -400/-700 variants, yet also had a 24% lower thrust specific fuel consumption (SFC).

The most recent variant of the J402 is the J402-CA-100, developed for the AGM-158 JASSM cruise missile. This derivative, like the -700, is based on the original -400 variant. The primary changes are an aerodynamically refined axial compressor and turbine section, resulting in a more fuel efficient engine at the same thrust levels as the -400.

== Variants ==
J402-CA-100

- Variant of the engine used in the AGM-158 JASSM.

J402-CA-400

- Baseline model. Designed for the Harpoon anti-ship missile. Also used in the AGM-84E Standoff Land Attack Missile and AGM-84H/K SLAM-ER.

J402-CA-700

- First variant developed for target drone use (MQM-107 Streaker). Slightly de-rated version of the -400 variant to improve service life.

J402-CA-702

- More powerful variant. Include additional axial compressor stage. Used in the D variant of the MQM-107 Streaker.

== Applications ==
- AGM-84E Standoff Land Attack Missile
- AGM-84H/K SLAM-ER
- AGM-158 JASSM
- Harpoon
- MQM-107 Streaker

== Specifications (J402-CA-400) ==
Data from ,

==== General characteristics ====
- Type: Turbojet
- Length: 29 in (74 cm)
- Diameter: 12.5 in (32 cm)
- Dry weight: 101.5 lb (46 kg)

==== Components ====
- Compressor: Single stage axial compressor, single stage centrifugal compressor
- Combustors: Annular
- Turbine: Single stage high pressure turbine

==== Performance ====
- Maximum thrust: 660 lbf (2.9 kN)
- Overall pressure ratio: 5.6:1
- Specific fuel consumption: 1.2 lb/(lbf⋅h) or 34 g/(kN⋅s)
- Thrust-to-weight ratio: 6.5

== See also ==
Comparable engines

- Microturbo TRI-40
- Williams F107

Related lists

- List of aircraft engines
