= AGM-159 JASSM =

American proposed missile design

The AGM-159 was a high precision cruise missile design proposed in 1996 by the Boeing (McDonnell-Douglas) company as a contender in the U.S. Air Force's JASSM project. It was intended to be able to penetrate advanced air defense systems, such as the Russian S-300 surface-to-air missile system. The weapon was intended to be carried by long range weapons platforms such as the B-2 Spirit and the B-1 Lancer. Development halted after Lockheed Martin's AGM-158 was selected for further development in 1998.

== Bibliography ==
- Nicklas, Brian D. (2012). The Complete Smithsonian Field Guide: American Missiles: 1962 to the Present Day. Barnsley, UK: Frontline Books. ISBN 978-1-84832-517-3.

== See also ==
- AGM-158 JASSM
- List of missiles
