= AGM-84H/K SLAM-ER =

AGM-84K SLAM-ER (Standoff Land Attack Missile - Expanded Response)
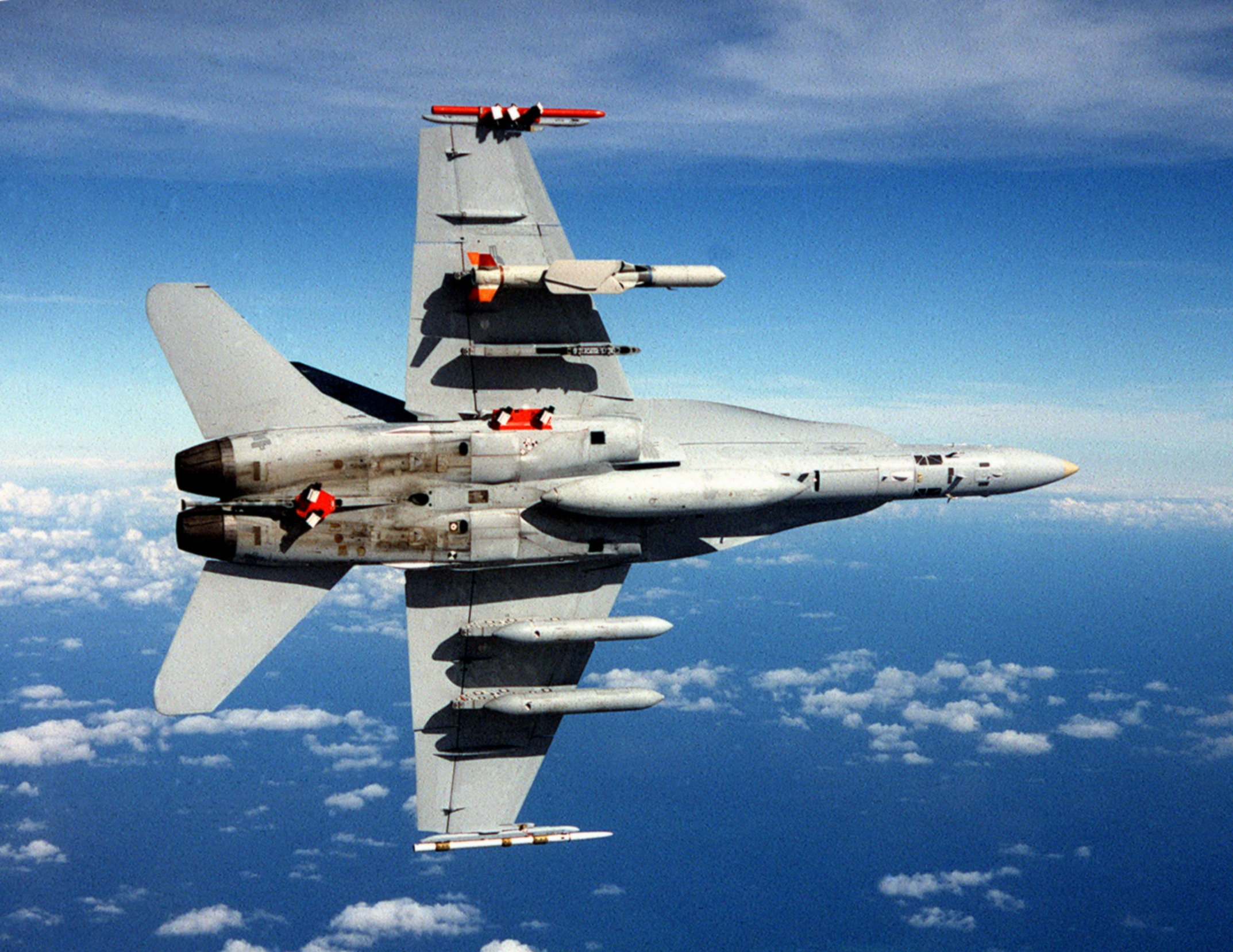
- An F/A-18 Hornet carrying one SLAM-ER missile (top) and two AN/AWW-13 datalink pods (bottom)
- Type: Long-range, precise air-launched air-to-ground standoff cruise missile
- Place of origin: United States

Service history
- In service: 2000–present
- Used by: United States and its allies
- Wars: Global War on Terrorism: Iraq War; Operation Enduring Freedom; 2026 Iran war

Production history
- Manufacturer: Boeing
- Unit cost: US$500,000–3,033,468 (2020)
- Variants: AGM-84H (2000–2); AGM-84K (2002–present)

Specifications
- Mass: 674.5 kg (1,487 lb)
- Length: 4.37 m (14.3 ft)
- Diameter: 34.3 cm (13.5 in)
- Wingspan: 2.43 m (8.0 ft)
- Warhead: WDU-40/B penetrating BF
- Warhead weight: 360 kg (800 lb)
- Engine: Teledyne CAE J402-CA-400 > 600 lbf (2.7 kN) thrust
- Operational range: 270 kilometres (170 mi)
- Maximum speed: 855 km/h (531 mph, 0.700 Mach)
- Guidance system: Inertial navigation system supplemented by the Global Positioning System (GPS); Infrared homing terminal guidance Command guidance data link to controlling aircraft DSMAC Automatic Target Acquisition (ATA)
- Launch platform: F/A-18C/D Hornet; F/A-18E/F Super Hornet; F-15E Strike Eagle; P-3C Orion; P-8 Poseidon and allied air forces, including the South Korean Air Force and the Turkish Air Force Past: S-3 Viking, A-6 Intruder

The AGM-84H/K SLAM-ER (Standoff Land Attack Missile-Expanded Response) is an advanced stand off precision-guided, air-launched cruise missile produced by Boeing Defense, Space & Security for the United States Armed Forces and their allies. Developed from the AGM-84E SLAM (Standoff Land Attack Missile, itself developed by Boeing Integrated Defense Systems from the McDonnell Douglas Harpoon anti-ship missile), the SLAM-ER is capable of attacking land and sea targets medium to long range (over 155 nautical miles/270 km maximum). The SLAM-ER relies on the Global Positioning System (GPS) and infrared imaging for its navigation and control, and it can strike both moving and stationary targets.

The SLAM-ER can be remotely controlled while in flight, and it can be redirected to another target after launch if the original target has already been destroyed, or is no longer considered to be dangerous (command guidance). The SLAM-ER is a very accurate weapon; as of 2009 it had the best circular error probable (CEP) of any missile used by the U.S. Navy.

== History ==
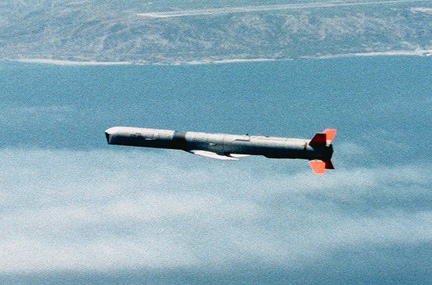
AGM-84H/K SLAM-ER

In 1999, Boeing and the U.S. Navy conducted a live fire of a SLAM-ER from an F/A-18 Hornet on the decommissioned USS Dale (CG-19) off the coast of Puerto Rico.

The SLAM-ER obtained initial operating capability in June 2000. A total of three SLAM-ER missiles were fired by the U.S. Navy during the Iraq War, and the missile was also used during Operation Enduring Freedom in Afghanistan.

The General Electric Company provides an Automatic Target Recognition Unit (ATRU) for the SLAM-ER that processes prelaunch and postlaunch targeting data, allows high speed video comparison (DSMAC), and enables the SLAM-ER to be used in a true "fire and forget" manner. It also includes a "man-in-the-loop" mode, where the pilot or weapons system officer can designate the point of impact precisely, even if the target has no distinguishing infrared signature.

It can be launched and controlled by a variety of aircraft including the F/A-18 Hornet, F/A-18 Super Hornet, F-16 Block 50+ and P-3C Orion, as well as by some F-15E Strike Eagle. The S-3B Viking was also able to launch and control the SLAM-ER. The South Korean Air Force's version of the F-15E Strike Eagle, the F-15K Slam Eagle, has been capable of launching and controlling the SLAM-ER since 2006 in test exercises.

In 2020, a proposal was put to Congress to allow the sale of the SLAM-ER to Taiwan.

In March 2025, US Navy deployed AGM-84H/K SLAM-ER missiles to strike Houthi targets.

Al Jazeera and BBC News reported that, based on missile debris found in the area shown by Iranian state TV, experts believe the 2026 Sirik wedding airstrike during the 2026 Iran war, killing four and injuring about 60 civilians, was carried out using an AGM-84H/K SLAM-ER missile.

== Operators ==
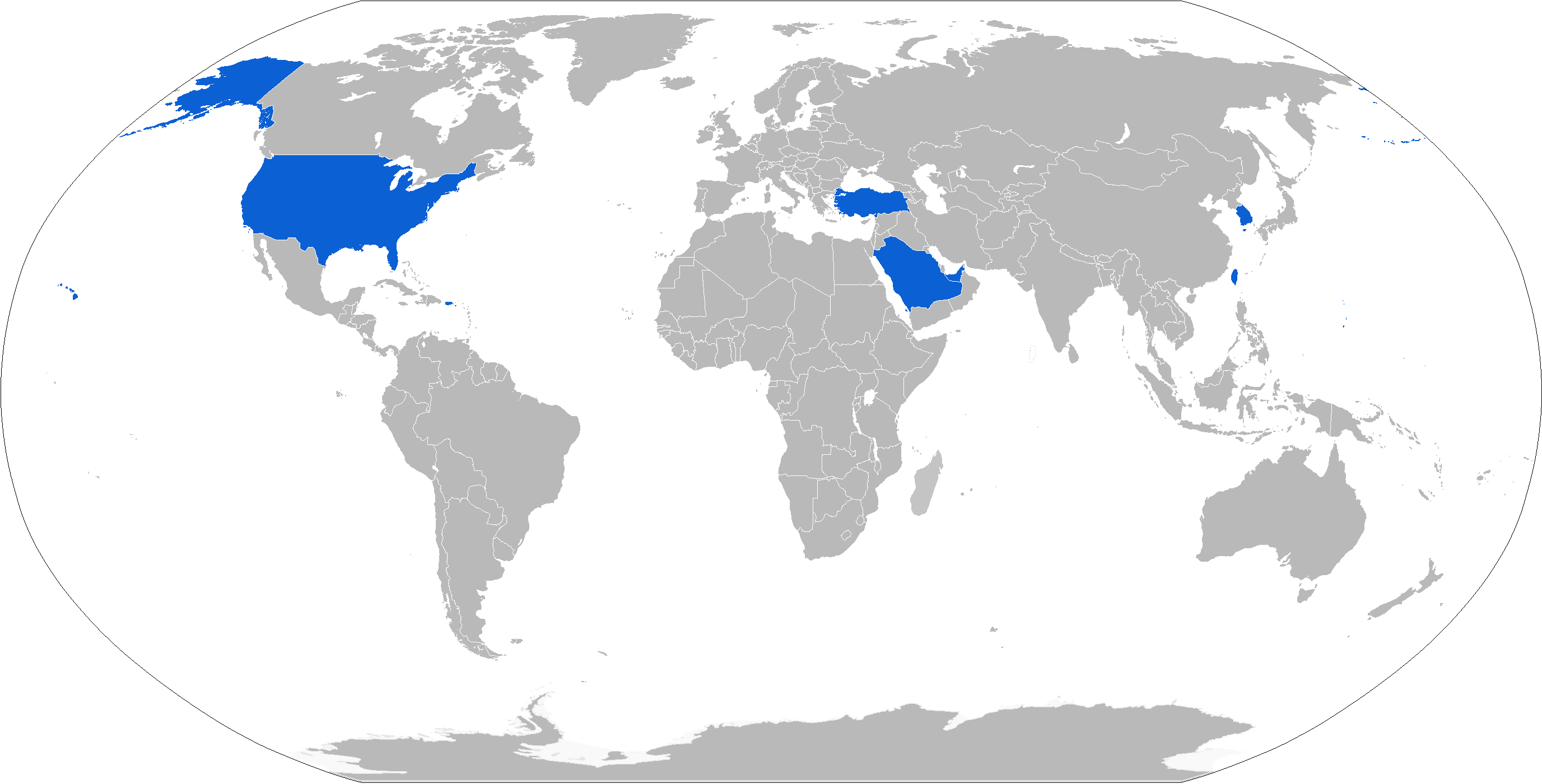
Map with SLAM-ER operators in blue

- Saudi Arabia
- South Korea
- Taiwan
- Turkey
- United Arab Emirates
- United States
