= Williams F107 =

Turbofan engine for cruise missiles

F107 / WR19
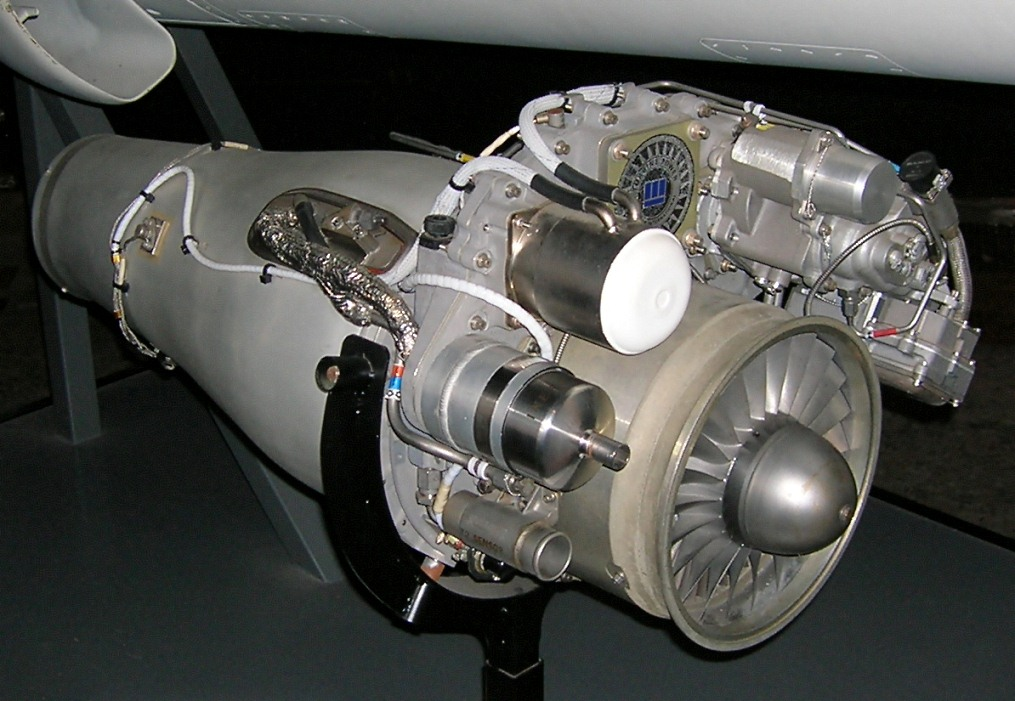
- An F107 engine on display at the San Diego Air & Space Museum
- Type: Turbofan
- National origin: United States
- Manufacturer: Williams International
- First run: 1970s
- Major applications: AGM-86 ALCM; BGM-109 Tomahawk; AGM-158B
- Developed into: Williams F112

The Williams F107 (company designation WR19) is a small turbofan engine made by Williams International. The F107 was designed to propel cruise missiles. It has been used as the powerplant for the AGM-86 ALCM, and BGM-109 Tomahawk, as well as the experimental Kaman KSA-100 SAVER and Williams X-Jet flying platform.

== Applications ==
- AGM-86 ALCM
- BGM-109 Tomahawk
- AGM-158 JASSM
- Kaman KSA-100 SAVER
- Williams X-Jet
- Bell Aerospace Flying Jet Belt
- Dynetics X-61 Gremlins

== Specifications (WR19) ==
Data from Aircraft engines of the World 1970

==== General characteristics ====
- Type:
- Length: 24 in (610 mm)
- Diameter: 12 in (300 mm)
- Dry weight: 67 lb (30 kg)

==== Components ====
- Compressor: 2-stage fan, 2-stage axial IP compressor, 1-stage centrifugal HP compressor
- Combustors: Annular combustion chamber
- Turbine: 1-stage HP turbine, 2-stage LP turbine
- Fuel type: JP-4 / JP-5 / JP-10
- Oil system: Pressure system with return

==== Performance ====
- Maximum thrust: 430 lbf (1.9 kN) Maximum continuous power

F107-WR-400 610 lbf (2.7 kN)
F107-WR-402 700 lbf (3.1 kN)
F107-WR-105/401 1,400 lbf (6.22 kN)

- Overall pressure ratio: 13.8:1
- Bypass ratio: 1:1
- Specific fuel consumption: 0.683 lb/lbf/h (69.6 kg/kN/h)
- Thrust-to-weight ratio: 6.42

== F122 ==
Williams F122
- Type: Turbofan
- National origin: United States
- Manufacturer: Williams International
- Major applications: KEPD 350
- Number built: 699 (as of August 2014)
- Developed from: Williams F107
- Variants: Williams F415

The Williams International F122 is a twin-shaft, axial-centrifugal-flow turbofan that is similar to the F107 in configuration but has a maximum thrust of 900 lbf (3.33 to 4.0 kN).

=== Design and development ===
The F122 is used to power the KEPD 350 air-launched cruise missile, and was the powerplant for the cancelled AGM-137 TSSAM air-launched cruise missile. Although the AGM-137 was cancelled, the F122 was first used for the Taurus KEPD when it was flown aboard that missile in April 2002.

=== Applications ===
- AGM-137 TSSAM
- KEPD 350

== See also ==
- List of aircraft engines
- Teledyne CAE J402
- Microturbo TRI 60
