= AGM-190 Black Arrow =

Black Arrow
- Type: Cruise missile
- Place of origin: United States

Production history
- Manufacturer: Leidos

Specifications
- Mass: 200 lb
- Operational range: in excess of 400 nautical miles
- Launch platform: AC-130J, MC-130J, OA-1K, MQ-9

AGM-190 Black Arrow, also known as the Small Cruise Missile, is a low-cost munition produced by Leidos designed to carry both warheads and non-kinetic payloads.

== Design and capabilities ==
Black Arrow is a small, lightweight cruise missile that can be fired from a variety of platforms, including palletized drop, ramp launch tubes, or conventionally launched from a stores pylon on a fixed-wing aircraft. It is envisioned as a "service-common 'bus'" that can be employed by a variety of platforms. It weighs approximately 200 pounds. Black Arrow was designed to be a low-cost “mission-adaptable delivery platform” capable of carrying out a variety of missions, including utilizing both warheads and non-kinetic payloads. It is designed to be produced at scale, in large quantities.

The missile features an X-shaped fin array, with apertures on its body, similar to the ADM-160 MALD. With a range of over 400 nm, the missile greatly outranges similarly-sized existing weapons in the Stand-Off Precision-Guided Munitions (SOPGM) arsenal.

Black Arrow was suspected to be a competitor for the Stand-off Precision Guided Weapon Program, which would have required a range of between 200-400 nautical miles; however it ultimately was revealed to be too large to fit inside the program's required Common Launch Tube. The Stand-Off Precision Guided Weapon Program also required an electro-optical/infrared seeker, with upgrade capability to a multi-mode seeker package “able to acquire and/or reacquire targets in flight”; a long-range, datalink connection to Situational Awareness Data Link (SADL) and Link-16; resilient GPS/INS guidance in GPS denied environments; and “a sensor capable of identifying targets once over the target area, and a payload to effect the target.” Analysts suspect many of these capabilities and requirements to have informed the design of the Black Arrow, despite its disqualification from the SPGW program. Black Arrow, or a very similar design, was submitted for the Air Force's Enterprise Test Vehicle (ETV) program with a target unit cost of $150,000 or less, but was not selected.

Black Arrow is small enough to be capable of fitting in the M142 HIMARS rocket artillery system.

== Development and testing ==
Development of the missile began in 2021, with the Small Cruise Missile program beginning in 2022, as part of an Air Force Special Operations Command (AFSOC) effort to build "affordable mass" in munitions. The US Special Operations Command deemed SCM one of its top priorities, and sought a lightweight, affordable standoff cruise missile that could be mass produced and launched from the MC-130J Commando II special operations tanker/transport aircraft, as well as the AC-130J gunship, and other AFSOC platforms. Adding standoff strike capabilities to non-strike aircraft was determined to be critical for a potential conflict in the Pacific against China; while for the AC-130J and other gunship platforms, the additional standoff range would allow the relatively slow aircraft it to quickly address and engage targets far from its current position. This is particularly important for aircraft like the AC-130J, which do not possess the survivability to utilize their main direct-fire armament in a high-threat environment against a peer opponent.

Leidos uses model-based system engineering practices as well as open system architecture to reduce Black Arrow's costs and allow it to be built rapidly at scale. Leidos cited their experience with rapidly fielding the GBU-69 Small Glide Munition (SGM) and demonstrating the Dynetics X-61 Gremlins with enabling them to meet several important milestones with the small cruise missile program. Black Arrow's intended scalability utilizes the same open system architecture and modular airframe practices as the GBU-69, of which Leidos has delivered 4,000 units to date as of April 2025.

Store separation testing from an AC-130J was successfully conducted in December 2023, following digital twin predictions of safe separation, benign store dynamics, and trajectory characteristics. Subsequent captive flight testing demonstrated operational flight software function, navigation performance, and flight safety system functionality.

In October 2024, Leidos announced that Black Arrow had successfully completed captive carry and store safe separation flight tests in preparation for guided flight tests from a U.S. Air Force Special Operations Command (AFSOC) aircraft. The following month, in November 2024, Leidos conducted the aforementioned guided flight test of the Black Arrow missile, though it did not announce the existence of this test until April 2025. The missiles were deployed from a pair of Ramp Launch Tube mounted to the rear ramp of an AC-130J aircraft. A video of the launch showed the missile being released tail-first from the RLT, followed by its single-piece pop-out wing deploying, and the motor engaging, but ended before showing impact with the ground. The test was part of a collaborative research and development agreement between Leidos, the U.S. Special Operations Command, and the Air Force Special Operations Command and demonstrated aircraft compatibility, system performance, waypoint uplinks, guidance accuracy as well as integration with the Naval Surface Warfare Center Battle Management System (BMS).

Leidos remains under contract to continue test and evaluation activities through the end of 2025.

== See also ==
- Anduril Industries
- Small Diameter Bomb
- Griffon
