= Lockheed AC-130 =

Gunship aircraft series by Lockheed

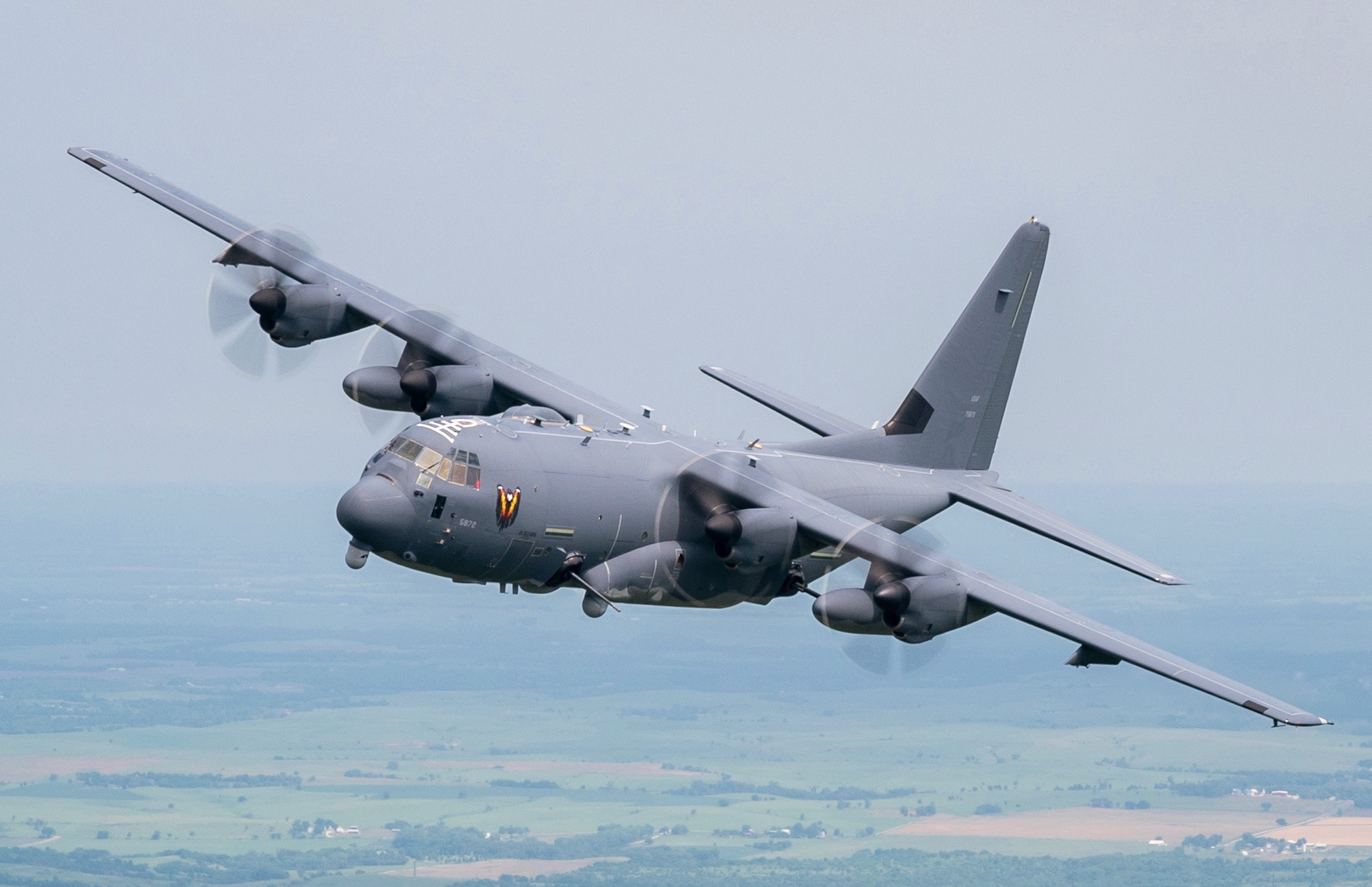
- An AC-130J gunship from the 4th Special Operations Squadron

General information
- Type: Ground-attack aircraft and close air support gunship for SOF teams
- National origin: United States
- Manufacturer: Lockheed Martin; Boeing
- Status: In service (AC-130J)
- Primary user: United States Air Force

History
- Introduction date: AC-130A: 1968; AC-130H: 1969; AC-130U: 1995; AC-130W: 2012; AC-130J: 2017
- First flight: AC-130A: 1967
- Retired: AC-130A: 1995; AC-130H: 2015; AC-130U: 2020; AC-130W: 2022
- Developed from: Lockheed C-130 Hercules; Lockheed Martin C-130J Super Hercules

The Lockheed AC-130 gunship is a heavily armed, long-endurance, ground-attack variant of the C-130 Hercules transport, fixed-wing aircraft. It carries a wide array of ground-attack weapons that are integrated with sensors, navigation, and fire-control systems. Since its large profile and low operating altitudes around 7,000 feet (2,100 m) make it an easy target, its close air support missions are usually flown at night.

The airframe is manufactured by Lockheed Martin, while Boeing is responsible for the conversion into a gunship and for aircraft support. Its sole operator has been the United States Air Force, which currently uses the AC-130J Ghostrider. Developed during the Vietnam War as "Project Gunship II", the AC-130 replaced the Douglas AC-47 Spooky, or "Gunship I". Since then, it has seen combat in Grenada, Panama, the Persian Gulf, Somalia, Bosnia, Kosovo, Afghanistan, Iraq, and Libya. Close air support roles include supporting ground troops, escorting convoys, and urban operations. Air-interdiction missions are conducted against planned targets and targets of opportunity. Force-protection missions include defending air bases and other facilities. AC-130Js are based at Hurlburt Field, Florida and Cannon AFB, New Mexico; gunships can be deployed worldwide. The squadrons are part of the Air Force Special Operations Command (AFSOC), a component of the United States Special Operations Command.

The AC-130 has an unpressurized cabin, with the weaponry mounted to fire from the port side of the fuselage. During an attack, the gunship performs a pylon turn, flying in a large circle around the target, so is able to fire at it for far longer than in a conventional strafing attack. The AC-130H Spectre was armed with two 20 mm M61 Vulcan cannons, one L/60 Bofors 40 mm cannon, and an M137 105 mm cannon and M37 recoil mechanism from the M102 howitzer. After 1994, the 20 mm cannons were removed. The upgraded AC-130U Spooky has a 25 mm GAU-12 Equalizer cannon in place of the Spectre's two 20 mm cannons, an improved fire-control system, and increased ammunition capacity. The new AC-130J was based on the MC-130J Commando II special-operations tanker. The AC-130W Stinger II is a modified C-130H with upgrades including a precision strike package.

== Development ==
=== Origins ===
During the Vietnam War, the C-130 Hercules was selected to replace the Douglas AC-47 Spooky gunship (Project Gunship I) to improve mission endurance and increase capacity to carry munitions. Capable of flying faster than helicopters and at high altitudes with excellent loiter time, the use of the pylon turn allowed the AC-47 to deliver continuous, accurate fire to a single point on the ground.

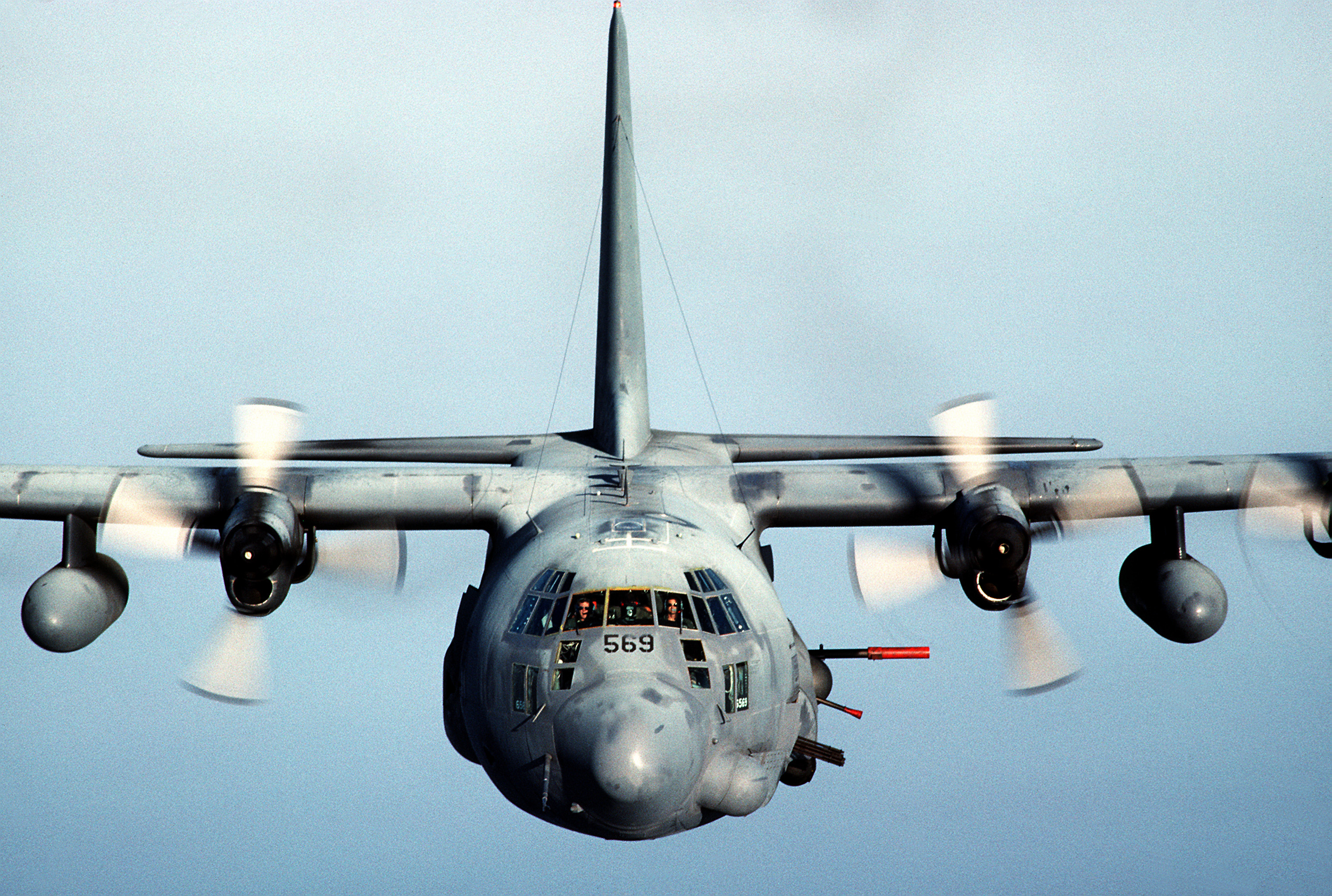
AC-130H Spectre, 1988

In 1967, JC-130A 54-1626 was selected for conversion into the prototype AC-130A gunship (Project Gunship II). The modifications were done at Wright-Patterson Air Force Base by the Aeronautical Systems Division. A direct-view night-vision telescope was installed in the forward door, an early forward-looking infrared device was placed in the forward part of the left wheel well, with miniguns and rotary cannons fixed facing down and aft along the left side. The analog fire-control computer prototype was handcrafted by Wing Commander Tom Pinkerton at the USAF Avionics Laboratory at Wright-Patterson AFB. Flight testing of the prototype was performed primarily at Eglin Air Force Base, followed by further testing and modifications. By September 1967, the aircraft was certified ready for combat testing and was flown to Nha Trang Air Base, South Vietnam, for a 90-day test program. The AC-130 was later supplemented by the AC-119 Shadow (Project Gunship III), which later proved to be underpowered.

Seven more airframes were converted to the "Plain Jane" configuration like the AC-130 prototype in 1968, and one aircraft received the "Surprise Package" refit in 1969. The Surprise Package upgrade included the latest 20 mm rotary autocannons and 40 mm Bofors cannon, but no 7.62 mm close-support armament. The Surprise Package configuration served as a test bed for the avionic systems and armament for the AC-130E. In 1970, 10 more AC-130As were acquired under the "Pave Pronto" project. In the summer of 1971, Surprise Package AC-130s were converted to the Pave Pronto configuration and assumed the new nickname of "Thor". Conversion of C-130Es into AC-130Es for the "PAVE Spectre" project followed. Regardless of their project names, the aircraft were more commonly referred to by the squadron's call sign, Spectre.

=== Recent and planned upgrades ===
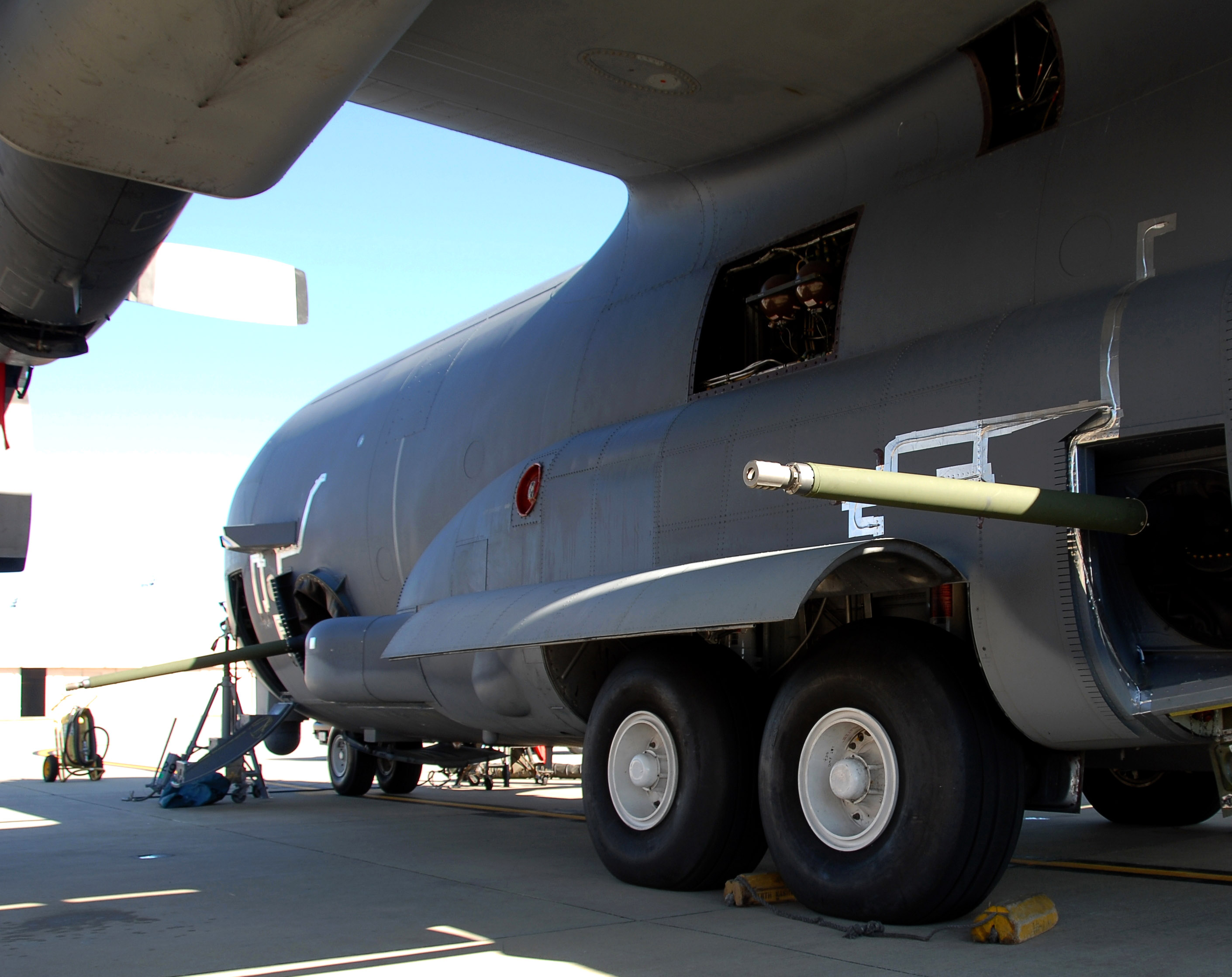
AC-130U armed with two 30 mm Bushmasters, 2007

In 2007, AFSOC initiated a program to upgrade the armament of AC-130s. The test program planned for the 25 mm GAU-12/U and 40 mm Bofors cannon on the AC-130U gunships to be replaced with two 30 mm Mk 44 Bushmaster II cannons. In 2007, the Air Force modified four AC-130U gunships as test platforms for the Bushmasters. These were referred to as AC-130U Plus 4 or AC-130U+4. AFSOC, however, canceled its plans to install the new cannons on its fleet of AC-130Us. It has since removed the guns and reinstalled the original 40 mm and 25 mm cannons and returned the planes to combat duty. Brigadier General Bradley A. Heithold, AFSOC's director of plans, programs, requirements, and assessments, said on 11 August 2008 that the effort was canceled because of problems with the Bushmaster's accuracy in tests "at the altitude we were employing it". Schedule considerations also drove the decision, he said.

Plans were made for the possible replacement of the 105 mm M102 howitzer with a breech-loading variant of the 120 mm M120 mortar. The 120mm breech-loading mortar concept offers more flexibility with the use of munitions that are currently available with greater lethality, precision strike capabilities, reduction in collateral damage, and decreased casualties in danger close scenarios. Using the newer AGM-114 Hellfire missiles, the Advanced Precision Kill Weapon System (based on the Hydra 70 rockets), or the Viper Strike glide bombs can dramatically increase the standoff capability of the AC-130.

The conceptual breechloading variant of the 120 mm M120 mortar has several key advantages over the conventional M102 105 mm howitzer. 100 rounds of ammunition weighs 4,200 lb (1,900 kg) for the M102 105 mm howitzer compared to 3,200 lb (1,500 kg) for the M120 120 mm mortar. The recoil load is 10,900 lbf (48,000 N) with the 105 mm howitzer compared to 5,600 lbf (25,000 N) with the M120 120 mm mortar. The gun recoiling weight for the M102 105 mm howitzer is 1,465 lb (665 kg) compared to 1,315 lb (596 kg) for the M120 120 mm mortar. The muzzle pressure for the M102 105 mm howitzer is 3,560 psi (24.5 MPa) compared to 1,620 psi (11.2 MPa) for the M120 120 mm mortar.

In 2010, the Air Force awarded L-3 Communications a $61 million (~$87.8 million in 2025) contract to add precision strike packages to eight MC-130W Combat Spear special-mission aircraft to give them a gunship-like attack capability; such-equipped MC-130Ws are known as Dragon Spears. AFSOC is arming these aircraft to relieve the high operational demands on AC-130 gunships until new AC-130Js enter service. The MC-130W Dragon Spear was renamed AC-130W Stinger II in 2011. The precision strike packages consist of a 30 mm gun and several precision guided munitions. Rails are mounted on the outboard pylon of the wing for four Hellfire missiles, SDBs, or SDB IIs under each. Ten common launch tubes (CLTs) are mounted on the rear ramp to fire Griffin A missiles; additional missiles are stored in the aircraft that can be reloaded in flight. CLTs are able to fire other small munitions able to fit inside the 6-inch (15 cm)-diameter, 48-inch (1.2 m)-long tubes.

The AC-130J Ghostrider came from a 2011 initiative that sought to acquire 16 new gunships based on newly built MC-130J Commando II special-operations tankers outfitted with a "precision strike package" to give them an attack capability, requesting $1.6 billion from fiscal years 2011 through 2015. This was to increase the size of the gunship fleet to 33 aircraft, a net increase of eight after the planned retirement of eight aging AC-130Hs. The first aircraft would be bought in fiscal 2012, followed by two in fiscal 2013, five in fiscal 2014, and the final eight in fiscal 2015. The decision to retain the C-130 came after funding for 16 C-27Js was removed from the fiscal 2010 budget.

The AC-130J was to follow the path of the Dragon Spear program. On 9 January 2013, the Air Force began converting the first MC-130J into an AC-130J. The first AC-130J was delivered to AFSOC on 29 July 2015. The first AC-130J gunships achieved initial operational capability (IOC) on 30 September 2017. The AC-130J has two planned increments: the Block 10 configuration includes an internal 30 mm gun, small diameter bombs, and laser-guided missiles launched from the rear cargo door; and Block 20 configuration adds a 105 mm cannon, large aircraft infrared countermeasures, wing-mounted Hellfire missiles, and radio-frequency countermeasures.

The Air Force decided to add a 105 mm cannon to the AC-130J in addition to the 30 mm cannon and smart bombs, the shells being more accurate and cheaper than dropping SDBs. AFSOC also pursued a directed-energy weapon on board the AC-130J by 2022, similar to the previous Advanced Tactical Laser program. It was to produce a beam of up to 120 kW, or potentially even 180–200 kW, weigh about 5,000 lb (2,300 kg), defensively destroy antiaircraft missiles, and offensively engage communications towers, boats, cars, and aircraft. A laser armament would have only been installed on a few aircraft rather than the entire AC-130J fleet; the laser would be mounted on the side in place of the 30 mm cannon. AFSOC eventually ruled out the idea in 2024 after the project was delayed by years, determining that placing a laser out the side of the airframe would yield so much air turbulence that it would disrupt the beam. In addition to this, while the laser weapon on the Lockheed AC-130 turned out to be a failure, Lockheed has been examining concepts for the integration of the laser module system onto the F-35 Joint Strike Fighter, he said. Other potential additions include an active denial system to perform airborne crowd control, and small unmanned aerial vehicles from the CLTs to provide remote video feed and coordinates to weapons operators through cloud cover. Called the Tactical Off-board Sensor (TOBS), the drones would be expendable and fly along a programmed orbit to verify targets the aircraft cannot see itself because of bad weather or standing off from air defenses. AFSOC was to initially use the Raytheon Coyote small UAV for the TOBS mission, as it is an off-the-shelf design with a one-hour endurance, but planned to fulfill the role with a new drone capable of a four-hour endurance by 2019.

The Air Force was also interested in acquiring a glide bomb that can be launched from the CLTs, capable of hitting ground vehicles traveling as fast as 120 km/h (70 mph) while above 10,000 ft (3,000 m). In June 2016, Dynetics was awarded a contract by SOCOM to integrate its tactical munition onto the AC-130. Designated the GBU-69/B Small Glide Munition, the weapon weighs 27 kg (60 lb) and is armed with a 16-kilogram (35 lb) blast-fragmentation warhead that can detonate by direct impact or at a selected height; despite being smaller, being unpowered allows for its warhead to be heavier than those on the Hellfire and Griffin A missiles, 9 kg (20 lb) and 5.9 kg (13 lb), respectively. Guidance is provided by a GPS receiver with anti-spoofing software and four distributed-aperture semiactive laser seeker apertures adapted from the WGU-59/B APKWS for terminal guidance. Approval for fielding occurred in early 2017. Dynetics was awarded a contract to deliver an initial batch of 70 SGMs in June 2017, with plans to buy up to 1,000. The SGM can travel 20 mi (32 km).

=== Future ===
As of 2026, AC-130 gunships have been providing close air support for special operators for 59 years. Although the aircraft have been kept relevant through constant upgrades to their weaponry, sensor packages, and countermeasures, they are not expected to be survivable in future nonpermissive environments due to their high signatures and low airspeeds. Military analysts, such as the Center for Strategic and Budgetary Assessments, have suggested that AFSOC invest in more advanced technologies to fill the role to operate in future contested combat zones, including a mix of low-cost disposable unmanned and stealthy strike aircraft.

AFSOC is considering a number of changes to the AC-130J in order to make it effective against advanced adversaries including removing the 105mm cannon and upgrading the aircraft with small cruise missiles, an AESA radar, and adaptive mission networking enhancements. In 2025, it was announced that the aircraft has carried out launch tests of Black Arrow, also known as the Small Cruise Missile (SCL), using its Ramp Launch Tubes.

== Design ==
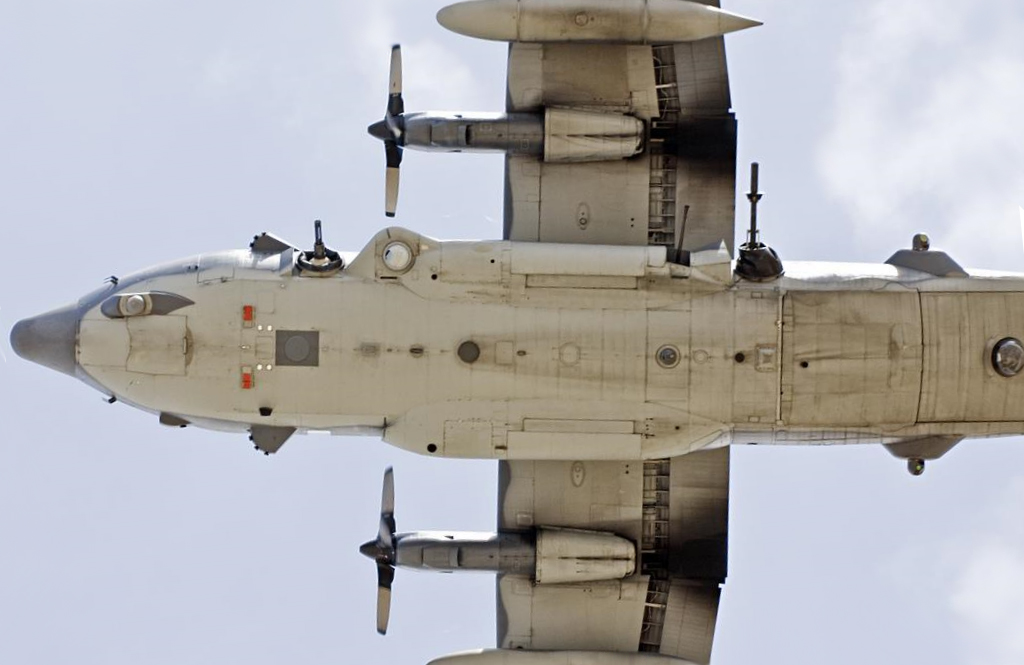
Underside of an AC-130U Spooky

=== Overview ===
The AC-130 is a heavily armed, long-endurance aircraft carrying an array of weapons against ground targets that are integrated with sophisticated sensors, navigation, and fire-control systems. It is capable of delivering precision firepower or area-saturation fire over a target area over a long period of time, at night, or in adverse weather. The sensor suite consists of an electro-optical image sensor, infrared sensor, and radar. These sensors allow the gunship to visually or electronically identify friendly ground forces and targets in most weather conditions.

The AC-130U is equipped with the AN/APQ-180, a synthetic aperture radar, for long-range target detection and identification. The gunship's navigational devices include inertial navigation systems and a global positioning system. The AC-130U employs technologies developed in the 1990s, which allow it to attack two targets simultaneously. It has twice the munitions capacity of the AC-130H. Although the AC-130U conducts some operations in daylight, most of its combat missions are conducted at night. The AC-130H's unit cost is US$132.4 million, and the AC-130U's cost is $190 million (fiscal 2001 dollars).

=== Upgrades ===
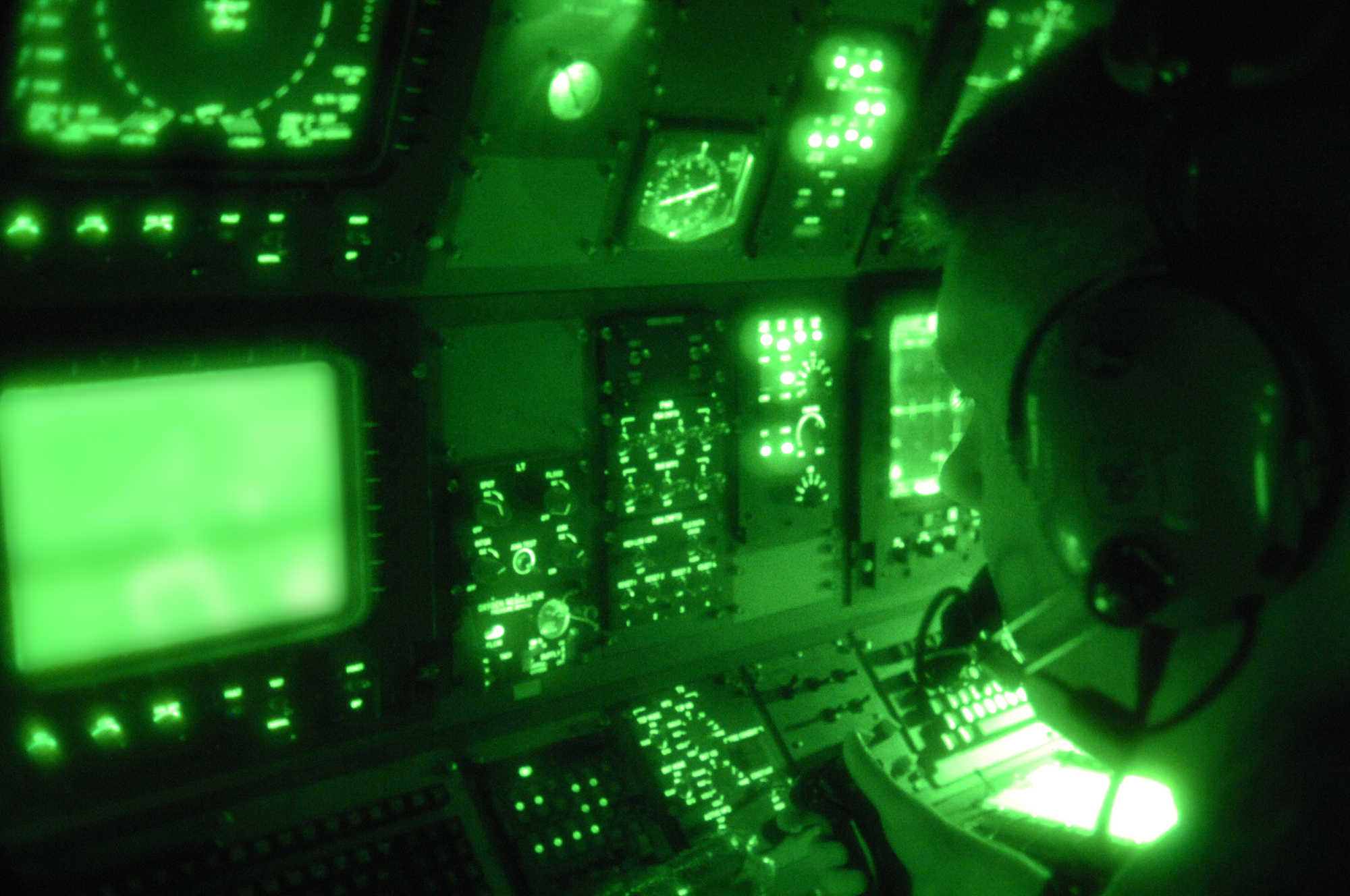
AC-130U sensor suite

During the Vietnam War era, the various AC-130 versions following the Pave Pronto modifications were equipped with a magnetic anomaly detector system called Black Crow (designated AN/ASD-5), a highly sensitive passive device with a phased-array antenna located in the left-front nose radome that could pick up localized deviations in the Earth's magnetic field normally used to detect submerged submarines. The Black Crow system was slaved into the targeting computers of the AC-130A/E/H, enabling the detection of the unshielded ignition coils of North Vietnamese trucks hidden under dense jungle foliage along the Ho Chi Minh trail. It could also detect hand-held transmitter signals of air controllers on the ground to identify and locate targets.

The PGM-38/U enhanced 25 mm high-explosive incendiary round was created to expand the AC-130U gunships' mission in standoff range and survivability for its 25 mm GAU-12/U gun. This round is a combination of the existing PGU-25 HEI and a M758 fuze designated as FMU-151/B to meet the MIL-STD-1316. The FMU-151 has an improved arming delay with multisensitive range.

== Operational history ==
=== Vietnam War ===
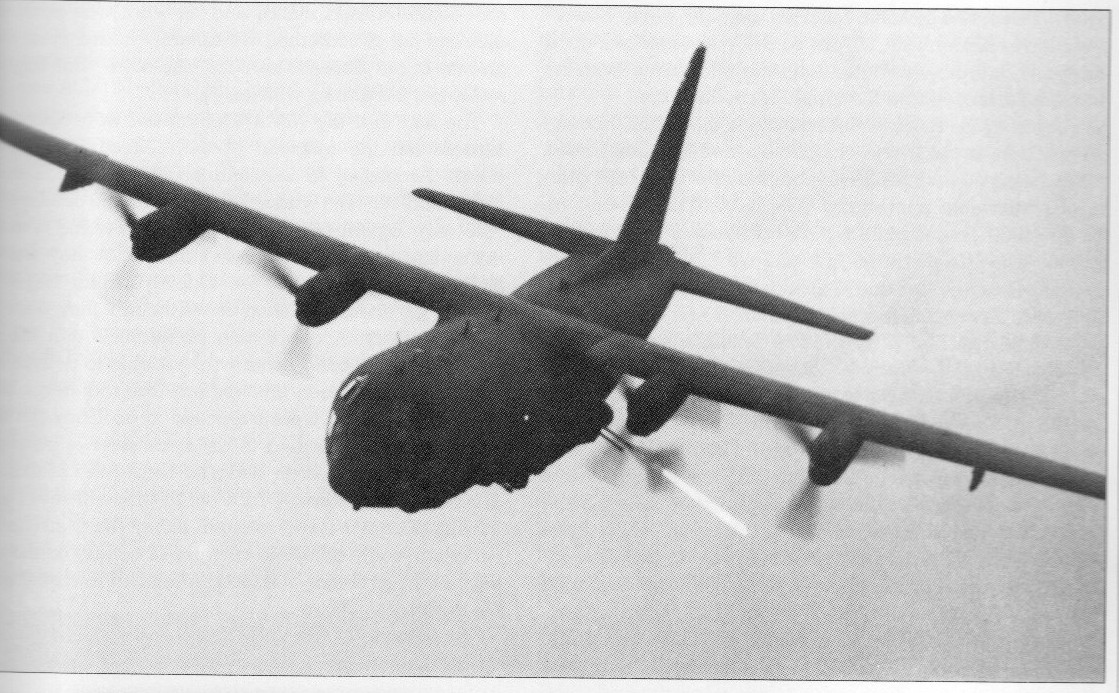
An AC-130 in Southern Laos circa 1970

The AC-130 gunship first arrived in South Vietnam on 21 September 1967 under the Gunship II program and began combat operations over Laos and South Vietnam that same year. In June 1968, AC-130s were deployed to Tan Son Nhut AB near Saigon for support against the Tet Offensive. By 30 October 1968, enough AC-130 Gunship IIs arrived to form a squadron, the 16th Special Operations Squadron of the 8th Tactical Fighter Wing, at Ubon Royal Thai Air Force Base, Thailand. At this time, the C-130A gunship was designated the AC-130A.

On 18 August 1968, an AC-130 gunship flying an armed reconnaissance mission in Vietnam's III Corps was diverted to support the Katum Special Forces Camp. The ground commander quickly assessed the accurate fire and capabilities of this weapons system and called for fire on his own perimeter when the Viet Cong attempted to bridge the wire on the west side of his position.

By December 1968, most AC-130s flew under F-4 Phantom II escort (to protect the gunship against heavy and concentrated antiaircraft fire) from the 497th Tactical Fighter Squadron, normally three Phantoms per gunship. On 24 May 1969, the first Spectre gunship was lost to enemy fire.

In late 1969, under code name "Surprise Package", 56-0490 arrived with solid-state, laser-illuminated, low light-level TV with a companion YAG laser designator, an improved forward-looking infrared (FLIR) sensor, video recording for TV and FLIR, an inertial navigation system, and a prototype digital fire-control computer. The remaining AC-130s were refitted with upgraded similar equipment in the summer of 1970, and then redeployed to Ubon RTAFB. On 25 October 1971, the first "Cadillac" gunship, the AC-130E, arrived in Vietnam. On 17 February 1972, the first 105mm cannon arrived for service with Spectre and was installed on Gunship 570. It was used from mid-February until the aircraft received battle damage to its right flap. The cannon was switched to Gunship 571 and was used until 30 March when the aircraft was shot down.

Summary of AC-130 Spectre gunships lost in the Vietnam War 1969–1972
Date	Gunship model	Unit	Cause of loss / remarks
24 May 1969	AC-130A	16th Special Operations Squadron	Downed by 37 mm anti-aircraft artillery (AA) at 6,500 ft (2,000 m) while on reconnaissance for enemy trucks
22 April 1970	AC-130A	16th SOS	Downed while truck hunting by 37 mm AA
28 March 1972	AC-130A	16th SOS	Downed while truck hunting along the Ho Chi Minh trail by a SA-2 surface-to-air missile (SAM), nose art named Prometheus
30 March 1972	AC-130E	16th SOS	Downed while truck hunting by 57 mm AA at 7,500 ft (2,300 m): The "E" model was armed with a 105 mm howitzer. This search and rescue mission was "overshadowed by the Bat-21 rescue mission."
18 June 1972	AC-130A	16th SOS	Downed by a SA-7 shoulder-fired SAM which struck the number-three engine and blew off the wing
21–22 December 1972	AC-130A	16th SOS	Downed while truck hunting along the Ho Chi Minh trail at 7,800 ft (2,400 m) by 37 mm AA

AC-130 Side-Firing Aircraft: Basic Combat Operations (1970) Official de-classified training film reel.

On 28 January 1973, the Vietnam peace accord went into effect, marking the end of Spectre operations in Vietnam. Spectre was still needed and active in the region, supporting operations in Laos and Cambodia. On 22 February 1973, American offensive operations in Laos ended and the gunships became totally committed to operations in the Cambodian conflict.

On 12 April 1975, the Khmer Rouge was threatening the capital of Phnom Penh and AC-130s were called on to help in Operation Eagle Pull, the final evacuation of American and allied officials from Phnom Penh before it was conquered by the communists. The AC-130 was also over Saigon on 30 April 1975 to protect the final evacuation in Operation Frequent Wind. Spectres were also called in when the USS Mayaguez was seized, on the open sea, by Khmer Rouge soldiers and sailors on 15 May 1975.

Six AC-130s and 52 air crew members were lost during the war. AC-130s reportedly destroyed more than 10,000 trucks and participated in many crucial close-air-support missions in Vietnam.

=== Cold War and later action ===
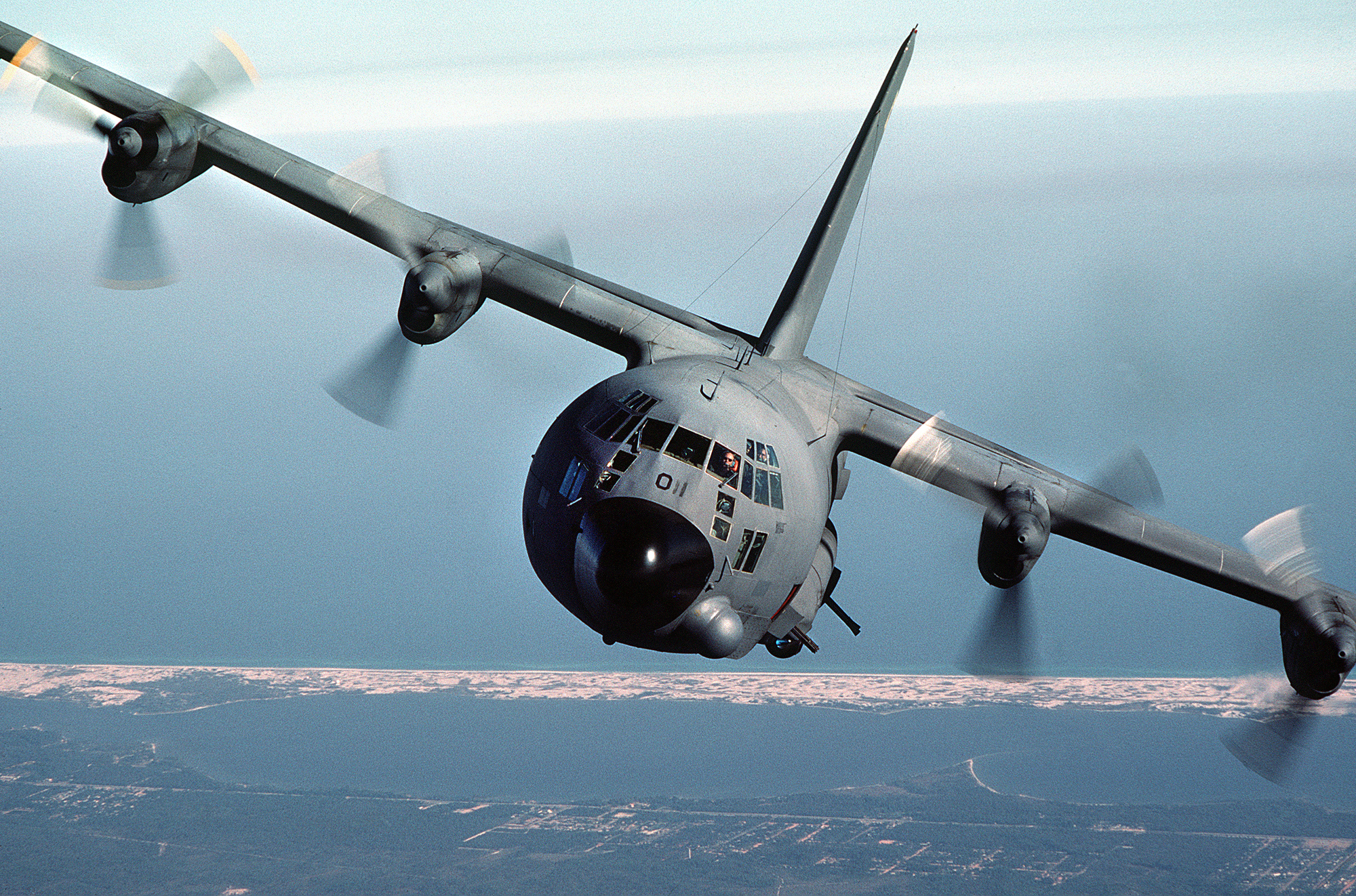
An AC-130A performs a left-hand pylon turn.

With the conclusion of hostilities in Southeast Asia in the mid-1970s, the AC-130H became the sole gunship in the regular Air Force, home based at Hurlburt Field, Florida, while the AC-130A fleet was transferred to the Air Force Reserve's 919th Tactical Airlift Group (919 TAG) at Eglin AFB Auxiliary Field #3/Duke Field, Florida. With the transition to the AC-130A, the 919 TAG was then redesignated as the 919th Special Operations Group.

In the late 1970s, when the AC-130H fleet was first being modified for in-flight refueling capability, a demonstration mission was planned and flown from Hurlburt Field, Florida, nonstop, to conduct a 2-hour live-fire mission over Empire Firing Range in the Republic of Panama, then return home. This 13-hour mission with two in-flight refuelings from KC-135 tankers proved the validity of flying long-range missions outside the contiguous United States to attack targets then return to home base without intermediate stops.

AC-130s from both the 4th and 16th Special Operations Squadrons have been deployed in nearly every conflict in which the United States has been involved, officially and unofficially, since the end of the Vietnam War.

In July 1979, AC-130H crews deployed to Howard Air Force Base, Panama, as a precaution against possible hostile actions against American personnel during the Nicaraguan Revolution. New time aloft and nonstop distance records were subsequently set by a 16th SOS two-ship AC-130H formation flight that departed Hurlburt Field on 13 November 1979 and landed on 15 November at Andersen Air Force Base, Guam, a distance of 7,200 nautical miles (13,300 km) and 29 hours 43 minutes nonstop, refueling four times in-flight. Refueling support for the Guam deployment was provided by KC-135 crews from the 305th Air Refueling Wing from Grissom AFB, Indiana.

In November 1979, four AC-130H gunships flew nonstop from Hurlburt Field to Anderson AFB, Guam, because of the hostage situation at the US Embassy in Iran. On Guam, AC-130H crews developed communications-out/lights-out refueling procedures for later employment by trial-and-error. This deployment with the 1 SOW/CC as task force commander was directed from the office of the CJCS for fear that Iranian militants could begin executing American Embassy personnel who had been taken hostage on 4 November. One early option considered AC-130H retaliatory punitive strikes deep within Iran. Later gunship flights exceeded the 1979 Hurlburt-to-Guam flight. Upon return in March 1980, the four planes soon found themselves in Egypt to support the ill-fated hostage rescue attempt.

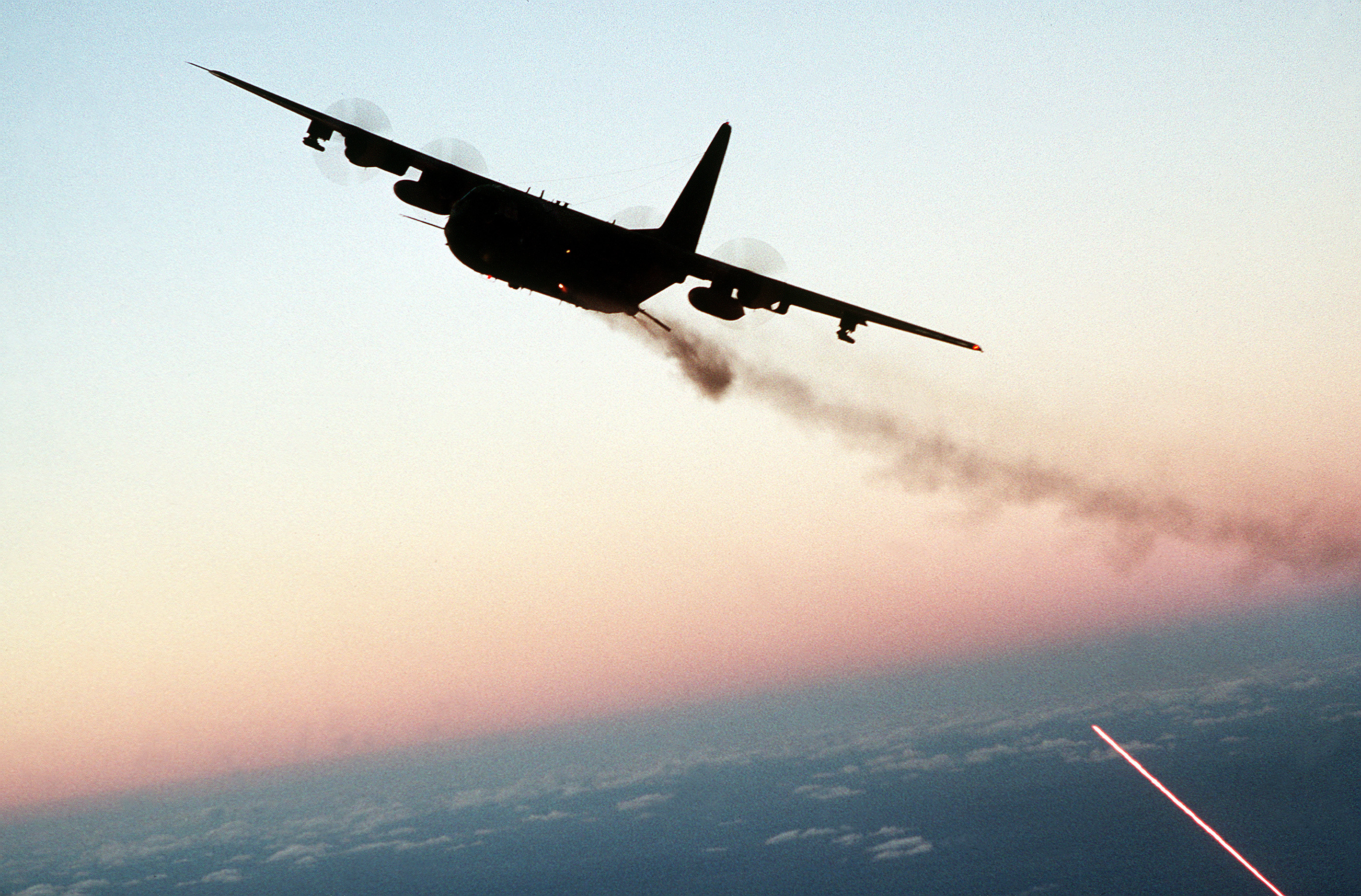
Smoke visible from rotary cannon during twilight operations in 1988

During Operation Urgent Fury in Grenada in 1983, AC-130s suppressed enemy air-defense systems and attacked ground forces enabling the assault of the Point Salines Airfield via airdrop and air-land of friendly forces. The AC-130 aircrew earned the Lieutenant General William H. Tunner Award for the mission.

The AC-130Hs of the 16th Special Operations Squadron unit maintained an ongoing rotation to Howard AB, Panama, monitoring activities in El Salvador and other Central American points of interest, with rules of engagement eventually permitting attacks on FMLN targets. This commitment of maintainers and crews started in 1983 and lasted until 1990. The AC-130 is considered to have hastened the end of the Salvadoran Civil War in the 1980s. Crews flew undercover missions from Honduras and attacked guerrilla camps and concentrations.

AC-130s also had a primary role during the United States invasion of Panama (named Operation Just Cause) in 1989, when they destroyed Panama Defense Force headquarters and numerous command-and-control facilities, and provided close air support for US ground troops. Aircrews earned the Mackay Trophy for the most meritorious flight of the year, and the Tunner Award.

=== Gulf War and the 1990s ===
A USAF AC-130 in combat operation

During the Gulf War of 1990–1991 (Operations Desert Shield and Desert Storm), Regular Air Force and Air Force Reserve AC-130s provided close air support and force protection (air base defense) for ground forces, and battlefield interdiction. The primary interdiction targets were early-warning/ground-control intercept sites along the southern border of Iraq. At its standard altitude of 12,000 ft (3,700 m), the aircraft had a proven ability to engage moving ground targets. The first gunship to enter the Battle of Khafji helped stop a southbound Iraqi armored column on 29 January 1991. One day later, three more gunships provided further aid to Marines participating in the operation. The gunships attacked Iraqi positions and columns moving south to reinforce their positions north of the city.

Despite the threat of SAMs and increasing visibility during the early morning hours of 31 January 1991, one AC-130H, AF Serial No. 69-6567, call-sign Spirit 03, opted to stay to continue to protect the Marines. A lone Iraqi with a Strela-2 MANPADS shot Spirit 03 down, and all 14 crew members were killed. The loss of Spirit 03 did however result in the US DoD joining the development of the AN/AAQ-24 Directed Infrared Countermeasures System which, in its updated laser-based form, is now a common fit across large US military aircraft.

The military has used AC-130 gunships during the humanitarian operations in Somalia (Operation Restore Hope and Operation United Shield) in 1992–93 and Operation Uphold Democracy in Haiti in 1994. AC-130s took part in Operation Assured Response in Liberia in 1996 and in Operation Silver Wake in 1997, the evacuation of American non-combatants from Albania.

AC-130s took part in the NATO missions in Bosnia and Herzegovina and Kosovo during the 1990s.

The AC-130U gunship set a new record for the longest sustained flight by any C-130 on 22 and 23 October 1997, when two AC-130U gunships flew 36 hours nonstop from Hurlburt Field to Taegu Air Base (Daegu), South Korea, being refueled seven times in the air by KC-135 tankers. The two gunships took on 410,000 lb (186,000 kg) of fuel. Gunships also were part of the buildup of US forces in 1998 to compel Iraq to allow UNSCOM weapons inspections.

=== War on Terror ===
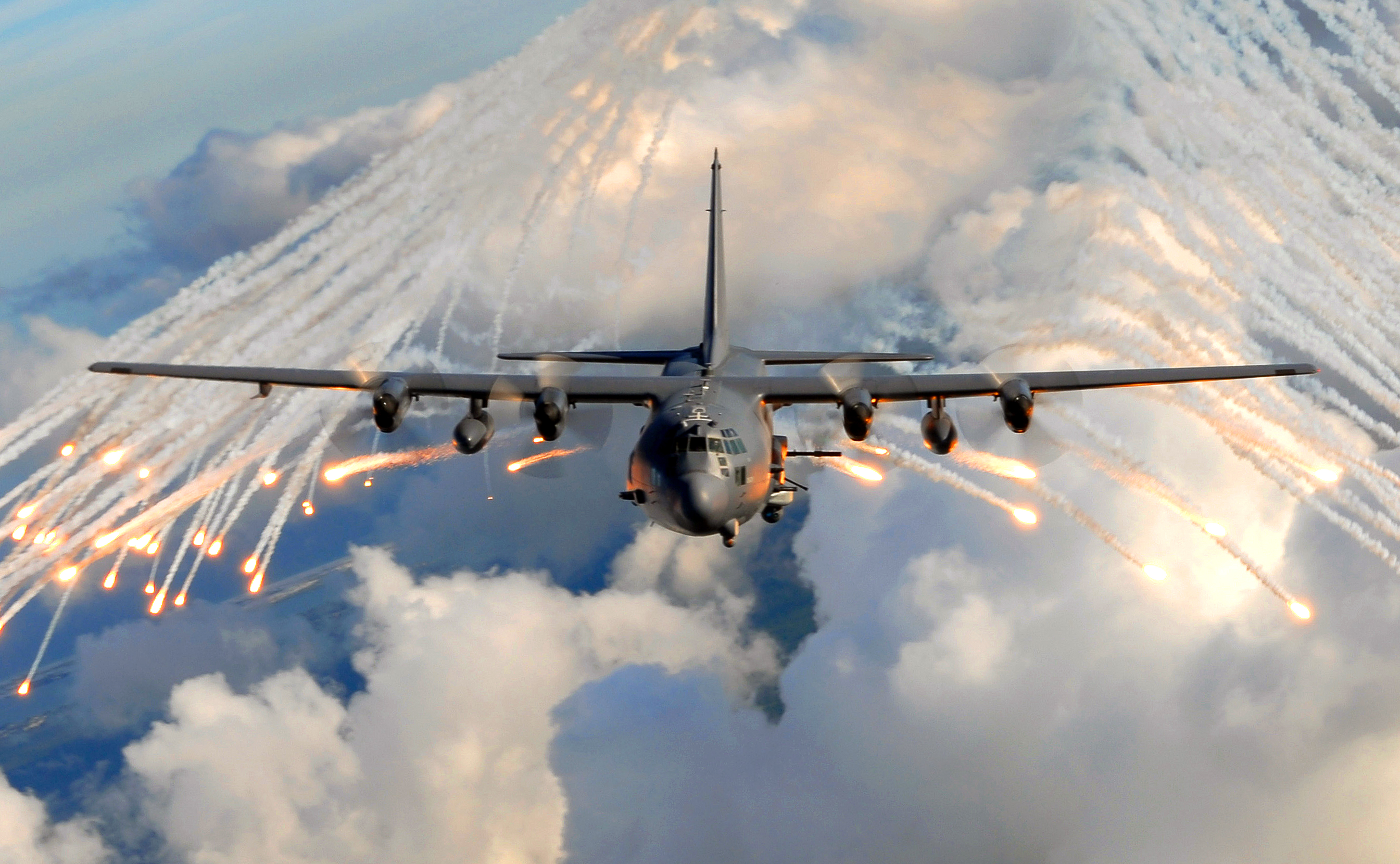
An AC-130U releasing flares

The US has used gunships with deployments to the War in Afghanistan (Operation Enduring Freedom, Operation Freedom's Sentinel, 2001–21), and Iraq War (Operation Iraqi Freedom, 2003–11). AC-130 strikes were directed by special forces on known Taliban locations during the early days of the war in Afghanistan. US Special Operations Forces used the AC-130 to support its operations. The day after arriving in Afghanistan, the AC-130s attacked Taliban and Al-Qaeda forces near the city of Kunduz and were directly responsible for the city's surrender the next day. On 26 November 2001, Spectres were called in to put down a rebellion at the prison fort of Qala-i-Jangi. The 16 SOS flew missions over Mazar-i-Sharif, Kunduz, Kandahar, Shkin, Asadabad, Bagram, Baghran, Tora Bora, and virtually every other part of Afghanistan. The Spectre participated in countless operations within Afghanistan, performing on-call close air support and armed reconnaissance. In March 2002, three AC-130 Spectres provided 39 crucial combat missions in support of Operation Anaconda in Afghanistan. During the intense fighting, the planes fired more than 1,300x 40mm and 1,200x 105mm rounds.

Close air support was the main mission of the AC-130 in Iraq. Night after night, at least one AC-130 was in the air to fulfill one or more air-support requests (ASRs). A typical mission had the AC–130 supporting a single brigade's ASRs followed by aerial refueling and another two hours with another brigade or SOF team. The use of AC-130s in places like Fallujah, urban settings where insurgents were among crowded populations of non-combatants, was criticized by human rights groups. AC-130s were also used for intelligence gathering with their sophisticated long-range video, infrared and radar sensors. In 2007, US Special Operations forces also used the AC-130 in attacks on suspected Al-Qaeda militants in Somalia.

Eight AC-130H and 17 AC-130U aircraft were in active-duty service as of July 2010. In March 2011, the Air Force deployed two AC-130U gunships to take part in Operation Odyssey Dawn, the US military intervention in Libya, which eventually came under NATO as Operation Unified Protector.

By September 2013, 14 MC-130W Dragon Spear aircraft have been converted to AC-130W Stinger II gunships. The Stinger gunships have been deployed to Afghanistan to replace the aging AC-130H aircraft and provide an example for the new AC-130J Ghostrider. Modifications began by cutting holes in the plane to make room for weapons and adding kits and bomb bases for laser-guided munitions. Crews added a 105 mm cannon, 20-inch infrared and electro-optical sensors, and the ability to carry 250-lb bombs on the wings.

The final AC-130H Spectre gunship, tail number 69-6569 "Excalibur" was retired on 26 May 2015 at Cannon Air Force Base, New Mexico.

On 15 November 2015, two days after the attacks in Paris by ISIL, AC-130s and A-10 Thunderbolt II attack aircraft destroyed a convoy of over 100 ISIL-operated oil tanker trucks in Syria. The attacks were part of an intensification of the US-led military intervention against ISIL called Operation Tidal Wave II (named after the original Operation Tidal Wave during World War II, a failed attempt to raid German oil fields that resulted in heavy aircraft and aircrew loss) in an attempt to cut off oil smuggling as a source of funding for the group.

On 3 October 2015, an AC-130 mistakenly attacked the Doctors Without Borders hospital in Kunduz, Afghanistan, killing 42 people and injuring over 30. In five separate runs, the gunship struck the hospital, which had been erroneously identified as the source of attacks on coalition members. Subsequent inquiries led to punishment of 16 military personnel and cited "human error" as the root cause.

On 30 September 2017, the Air Force declared the AC-130J Ghostrider had achieved initial operational capability, with six gunships having been delivered; the aircraft is planned to reach full operational capability by 2023 with 37 gunships delivered. The J-variant is lighter and more fuel efficient than previous versions, able to fly at 416 mph (669 km/h) with a range of 3,000 mi (4,800 km) and service ceiling of 28,000 ft (8,500 m). The AC-130U returned from its final combat deployment on 8 July 2019; the final AC-130U was retired in June 2020. AFSOC started taking delivery of the AC-130J in spring 2019, and the aircraft began deploying to Afghanistan by the summer.

On 21 November 2023, the Air Force released a statement that an AC-130J had performed a retaliatory strike on Iranian-backed militia group in central Iraq. The strike happened near Al-Asad Airbase after the militia members reportedly launched a ballistic missile against Al-Asad airbase. The Deputy Press Secretary of The Pentagon, Sabrina Singh stated "This self-defense strike resulted in some hostile fatalities." Notably the AC-130J's transponder remained on during the strike, and the remainder of its sortie.

== Variants ==
=== In service ===
AC-130J Ghostrider

Based on MC-130J; 32 aircraft were procured as of 2014 to replace the AC-130H. As of 2018, the first AC-130J Ghostrider squadron, the 73rd Special Operations Squadron, is operating from Hurlburt Field, Florida.

=== Retired ===
AC-130A Spectre (Project Gunship II, Surprise Package, Pave Pronto)

Conversions of C-130As; 19 completed; transferred to Air Force Reserve in 1975, retired in 1995.

AC-130E Spectre (Pave Spectre, Pave Aegis)

Conversions of C-130Es; 11 completed; 10 upgraded to AC-130H configuration.

AC-130H Spectre

Upgraded AC-130E aircraft; 8 completed; last aircraft retired in 2015.

AC-130U Spooky II

The 3rd generation AC-130 gunship. The variant was retired in June 2020.

AC-130W Stinger II (formerly known as the MC-130W Dragon Spear)

In May 2012 MC-130W Dragon Spear was renamed to AC-130W Stinger II. 12 MC-130Ws converted to gunships. The variant was retired in July 2022.

== Operators ==
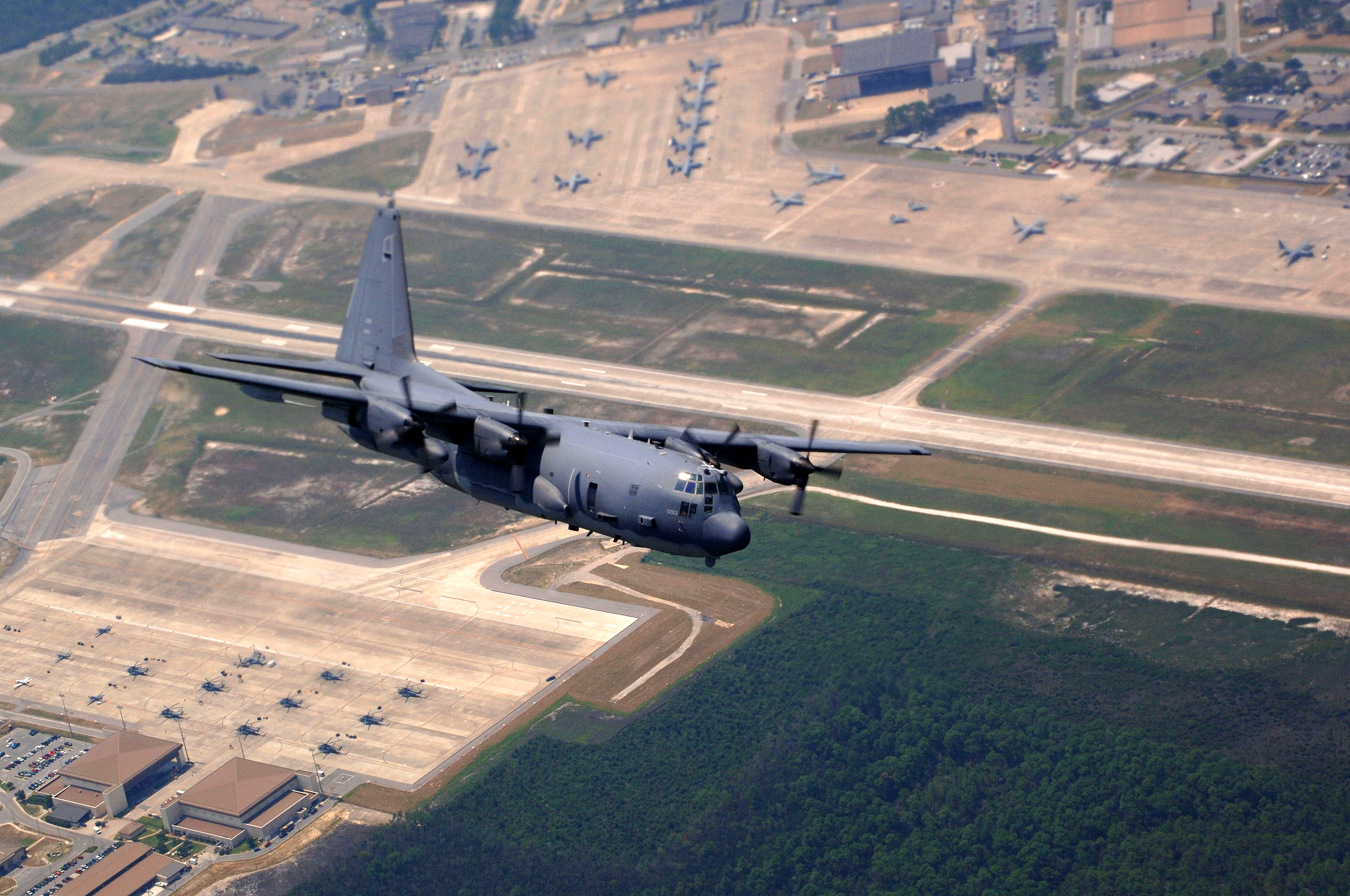
AC-130U over Hurlburt Field

United States

- United States Air Force- 37 Active Duty as of 2024
  - Detachment 2, 14th Air Commando Wing – Nha Trang Air Base, South Vietnam 1967–1968
  - 8th Tactical Fighter Wing – Ubon/Korat Royal Thai Air Force Base, Thailand 1968–1975
    - 16th Special Operations Squadron
  - 1st Special Operations Wing – Hurlburt Field, Florida 1975–1993, 2006–present
    - 4th Special Operations Squadron 2006–present
    - 8th Special Operations Squadron 1975
    - 16th Special Operations Squadron 1975–1993, 2006–2007
    - 18th Flight Test Squadron 1991–1993, 2006–2017
    - 19th Special Operations Squadron 2006–2017
    - 73rd Special Operations Squadron 2018–present
  - 16th Special Operations Wing – Hurlburt Field, Florida 1993–2006
    - 4th Special Operations Squadron 1995–2006
    - 73rd Special Operations Squadron 2007–2015
    - 18th Flight Test Squadron
    - 19th Special Operations Squadron 1996–2006
  - 27th Special Operations Wing – Cannon AFB, New Mexico 2007–
    - 16th Special Operations Squadron
    - 17th Special Operations Squadron -2023
    - 551st Special Operations Squadron -2021
  - 46th Test Wing – Eglin AFB, Florida 2014–present
    - 413th Flight Test Squadron
  - 412th Test Wing – Edwards AFB, California 1990–1995
    - 418th Flight Test Squadron
  - 492nd Special Operations Wing – Hurlburt Field, Florida 2017–present
    - 18th Special Operations Test and Evaluation Squadron
    - 19th Special Operations Squadron
  - 919th Special Operations Wing – Duke Field, Florida 1975–1995
    - 711th Special Operations Squadron

== Aircraft on display ==
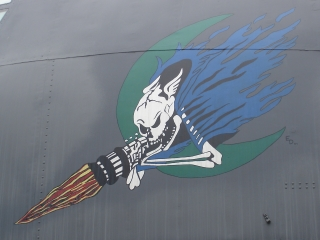
Nose art on AC-130A AF Serial No. 53–3129 at the USAF Armament Museum, Eglin AFB, Florida

One of the first seven AC-130A aircraft deployed to Vietnam was AF serial no. 53–3129, named First Lady in November 1970. This aircraft was a conversion of the first production C-130. On 25 March 1971, it took an anti-aircraft artillery hit in the belly just aft of the nose gear wheel well over the Ho Chi Minh trail in Laos. The 37 mm shell destroyed everything below the crew deck and barely missed striking two crew members. The pilot was able to crash land the aircraft safely. In 1975, after the conclusion of US involvement in the Vietnam war, it was transferred to the Air Force Reserve, where it served with the 711th Special Operations Squadron of the 919th Special Operations Wing. In 1980, the aircraft was upgraded from the original three-bladed propellers to the quieter four-bladed propellers and was eventually retired in late 1995. The retirement also marked an end to the Air Force Reserve Command flying the AC-130A. The aircraft now sits on display in the final Air Force Reserve Command configuration with grey paint, black markings, and the four-bladed Hamilton Sunstrand 54H60-91 props at the Air Force Armament Museum at Eglin Air Force Base, Florida, USA.

A second aircraft, AF serial no. 56–0509, named the Ultimate End, was originally accepted as a C-130A by the Air Force on 28 February 1957, and modified to the AC-130A configuration on 27 July 1970. The aircraft participated in the Vietnam War and the rescue of the SS Mayaguez. Ultimate End demonstrated the durability of the C-130 after surviving hits in five places by 37 mm anti-aircraft artillery on 12 December 1970, extensive left wing leading edge damage on 12 April 1971 and a 57 mm round damaging the belly and injuring one crewman on 4 March 1972. "Ultimate End" was reassigned to the Air Force Reserve's 919th Special Operations Wing at Eglin AFB Auxiliary Field No.3 / Duke Field on 17 June 1975, where it continued in service until retired in the fall 1994 and transferred to Air Force Special Operations Command's Heritage Air Park at Hurlburt Field, Florida. While assigned to the 711th Special Operations Squadron, Ultimate End served in Operations JUST CAUSE in Panama, DESERT STORM in Kuwait and Iraq, and UPHOLD DEMOCRACY in Haiti. After 36 years and seven months of service, 24 years as a gunship, Ultimate End retired from service on 1 October 1994. It made its last flight from Duke Field to Hurlburt Field on 20 October 1994. The Spectre Association dedicated "Ultimate End" (which served with the 16 SOS in Vietnam) on 4 May 1995. Lt Col Michael Byers, then 16 SOS commander, represented the active-duty gunship force and Clyde Gowdy of the Spectre Association represented all Spectre personnel past and present for the unveiling of a monument at the aircraft and the dedication as a whole.

A third AC-130A, AF serial no. 54–1630, is on display in the Cold War Gallery at the National Museum of the United States Air Force at Wright-Patterson AFB, Ohio. Named Azrael for the angel of death in Islam who severs the soul from the body, this aircraft figured prominently in the closing hours of Operation Desert Storm. On 26 February 1991, Coalition ground forces were driving the Iraqi Army out of Kuwait. With an Air Force Reserve crew called to active duty, Azrael was sent to the Al Jahra highway (Highway 80) between Kuwait City and Basra, Iraq, to intercept the convoys of tanks, trucks, buses, and cars fleeing the battle. Facing SA-6 and SA-8 surface-to-air missiles and 37 mm and 57 mm radar-guided anti-aircraft artillery the crew attacked and destroyed or disabled most of the convoys. Azrael was also assigned to the 919th Special Operations Wing and retired to the museum in October 1995.

Another AC-130A, AF serial no. 54–1626, the original prototype AC-130 named "Gunship II" is on display at the outdoor Air Park at the National Museum of the United States Air Force at Wright-Patterson AFB, Ohio. This aircraft served in Southeast Asia from 1967 to 1972, then served in JC-130A test configuration. It was transferred to the National Museum of the United States Air Force in 1976, and converted back to AC-130A configuration in the late 1990s.

AC-130A serial no. 54–1623, c/n 3010, named "Ghost Rider" served in Southeast Asia and later conflicts until being retired in 1997 to Dobbins AFB, Georgia. Ghost Rider eventually was transferred and displayed at the Aviation Wing Museum at Marietta, Georgia.

AC-130A serial no. 55–0014, named "Jaws of Death," initially served as a C-130A cargo aircraft before being converted to AC-130A configuration in 1970 and being deployed in Southeast Asia from 1971 to 1975. The aircraft also participated in Operation Desert Storm as part of Joint Task Force Proven Force in 1991 before being retired in 1995, when it was flown to Robins Air Force Base, Georgia and placed on display at the adjacent Museum of Aviation in Warner Robins.

AC-130H serial no. 69-6575, named "Wicked Wanda" is on display at the Hurlburt Field, FL airpark.

AC-130U serial no. 87-0128, named "Big Daddy" is on display at the Hurlburt Field, FL airpark.

== Specifications (AC-130) ==

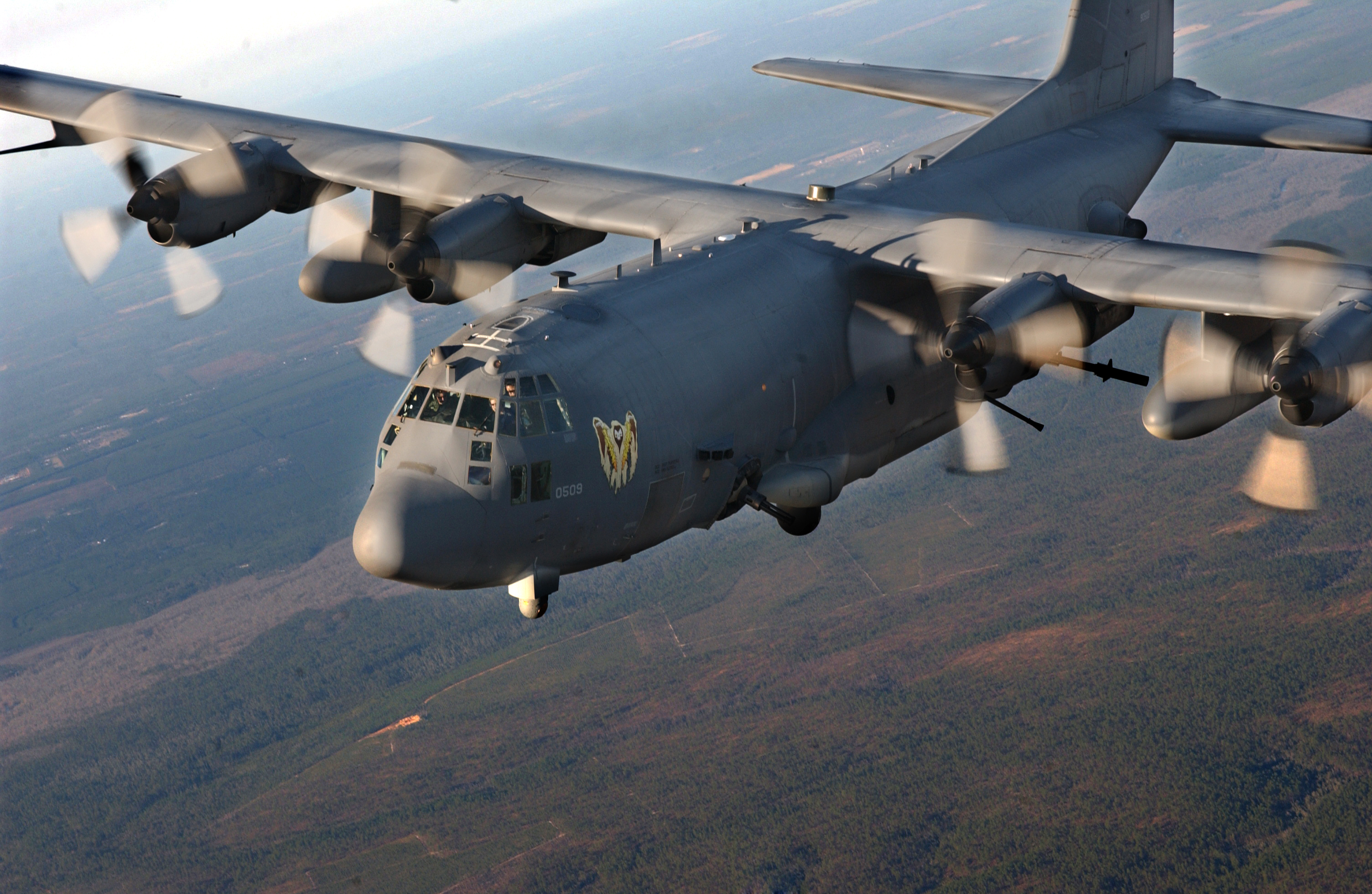
AC-130U Spooky

Data from USAF AC-130U Fact Sheet, AC-130J Fact Sheet

General characteristics

- Crew: 7
  - Officers: 4 (Two Pilots, Two Combat Systems Officers)
  - Enlisted: 3 (Special Mission Aviators)
- Length: 97 ft 9 in (29.79 m)
- Wingspan: 132 ft 7 in (40.41 m)
- Height: 38 ft 6 in (11.73 m)
- Wing area: 1,745.5 sq ft (162.16 m^{2})
- Max takeoff weight: 155,000 lb (70,307 kg)
- Powerplant: 4 × Allison T56-A-15 turboprop engine, 4,300 shp (3,200 kW) each (AC-130U)
- Powerplant: 4 × Rolls-Royce AE 2100D3 , 4,700 shp (3,500 kW) each (AC-130J)
- Propellers: 6-bladed Dowty R391 featuring ARA-D/A airfoils

Performance

- Maximum speed: 362 kn (416 mph, 669 km/h)
- Service ceiling: 39,000 ft (12,000 m)

Armament

AC-130A Project Gunship II (retired)

- 4 × 7.62 mm GAU-2/A miniguns
- 4 × 20 mm (0.787 in) M61 Vulcan 6-barrel rotary cannon

AC-130A Surprise Package, Pave Pronto, AC-130E Pave Spectre (retired)

- 2× 7.62 mm GAU-2/A miniguns
- 2× 20 mm M61 Vulcan cannon
- 2× 40 mm (1.58 in) L/60 Bofors cannon

AC-130E Pave Aegis (retired)

- 2× 20 mm M61 Vulcan cannon
- 1× 40 mm (1.58 in) L/60 Bofors cannon
- 1× 105 mm (4.13 in) M102 howitzer

AC-130H Spectre (retired)

(Prior to c. 2000)

- 2× 20 mm M61 Vulcan cannon
- 1× 40 mm (1.58 in) L/60 Bofors cannon
- 1× 105 mm (4.13 in) M102 howitzer

(Latest armament)

- 1× 40 mm (1.58 in) L/60 Bofors cannon
- 1× 105 mm (4.13 in) M102 howitzer

AC-130U Spooky II (retired)

- 1× General Dynamics 25 mm (0.984 in) GAU-12/U Equalizer 5-barreled rotary cannon
- 1× 40 mm (1.58 in) L/60 Bofors cannon
- 1× 105 mm (4.13 in) M102 howitzer

AC-130W Stinger II (retired) / AC-130J Ghostrider (in service)

- 1× 30 mm ATK GAU-23/A autocannon
- 1× 105 mm M102 howitzer
- 'Gunslinger' weapons system with launch tube for AGM-176 Griffin missiles and/or GBU-44/B Viper Strike munitions (10 round magazines)
- Wing mounted, AGM-114 Hellfire missiles (AC-130J only), GBU-39 Small Diameter Bombs (SDBs), and/or GBU-53/B SDB IIs (4 per hardpoint on BRU-61/A rack)

Avionics

AC-130H Spectre (retired)

- Mission systems:
  - Northrop Grumman AN/APN-241 multimode navigation radar – derived version of AN/APG-66 radar (formerly used on F-16A Fighting Falcon) consisting of precise navigation and air-to-ground modes including Monopulse Ground Mapping (MGM), Doppler Beam Sharpening (DBS), high resolution synthetic-aperture radar (SAR), Terrain Avoidance/Terrain Following (TA/TF), skin paint (for Station KEeping; SKE), maritime detection, weather/turbulence detection, wind shear alert, and ballistic wind measurement (for precision airdrop)
  - Motorola (now General Dynamics) AN/APQ-150 Beacon Tracking Radar (BTR) – side-looking radar designed to search, acquire, and track ground beacon signal (X-band transponder) located at a friendly position from 10 nautical miles, beacon coordinate is used as a reference point for ground troop to give the gunship a bearing and range from the beacon to the desired target (mounted between 40 mm cannon and 105 mm howitzer)
  - Cubic Corporation AN/ARS-6 Personnel Locator System (PLS) – radio navigation set
  - Raytheon AN/AAQ-26 Infrared Detecting Set (IDS) – long-wave infrared (LWIR) band Forward Looking Infrared (FLIR) (mounted forward of the nose landing gear door)
  - General Electric (now Lockheed Martin) AN/ASQ-145 Low Light Level Television (LLLTV) – EO fire control system consists of television camera (CCD-TV), AN/AVQ-19 Laser Target Designator/Ranger (LTD/R – 1064 nm laser emitter with permanently preset PRF code) with eyesafe mode (1570 nm laser emitter), AN/AAT-3 Ambient Temperature Illuminator (ATI – wide beam 860 nm laser illuminator), and Infrared Zoom Laser Illuminator Designator (IZLID – airborne version of 860 nm narrow beam laser pointer/marker and illuminator AN/PEQ-18) (mounted in the crew entrance door)
- Navigation systems:
  - Teledyne Ryan (now part of Northrop Grumman) AN/APN-218 radar – doppler navigation radar
- Previously installed systems:
  - AN/APN-59 radar – search and weather radar

AC-130U Spooky II (retired)

- Mission systems:
  - Raytheon AN/APQ-180 multimode attack radar – enhanced version of AN/APG-70 radar (used on F-15E Strike Eagle) incorporating several enhanced air-to-ground modes such as fixed target track, ground moving target indication and track, projectile impact point position, beacon track, and a weather detection
  - Raytheon AN/AAQ-26 IDS – LWIR FLIR (mounted on port side of the nose landing gear door)
  - Lockheed Martin AN/AAQ-39 Gunship Multispectral Sensor System (GMS2) – EO/IR fire control system consists of mid-wave infrared (MWIR) FLIR, two Image-Intensified Television (I2TV) cameras (CCD-TV), laser target designator/rangefinder with eyesafe mode (1064 and 1570 nm dual mode laser emitter), and near-infrared (NIR) laser pointer/marker (860 nm laser emitter) (mounted under the nose of port landing gear sponson)
- Previously installed systems:
  - GEC-Marconi All Light Level Television (ALLTV) – EO fire control systems consists of CCD-TV, Laser Target Designator/Range Finder (LTD/RF – 1064 nm laser emitter with in-flight programmable PRF code) with eyesafe mode (1570 nm laser emitter), and Laser Illuminator Assembly (LIA – 860 nm laser emitter)
- Countermeasures:
  - Raytheon AN/ALR-69 – digital Radar warning receiver (RWR)
  - L-3 Communications AN/AAR-44 – UV-based Missile Approach Warning System (MAWS)
  - ITT Exelis AN/ALQ-172 – Digital radio frequency memory (DRFM) jammer-based Electronic countermeasure (ECM) incorporating integrated Electronic Warfare (EW) self-protection function of detection, processing, warning, prioritization, jamming, and threat display
  - BAE Systems AN/ALQ-196 Low-Band Jammer (LBJ) – low frequency DRFM jammer-based ECM
  - Northrop Grumman AN/AAQ-24 Nemesis – laser-based Directional Infrared Counter Measures (DIRCM) (mounted on the port and starboard rear fuselage)
  - BAE Systems AN/ALE-47 Countermeasure Dispensing System (CMDS) – chaff/flare dispenser

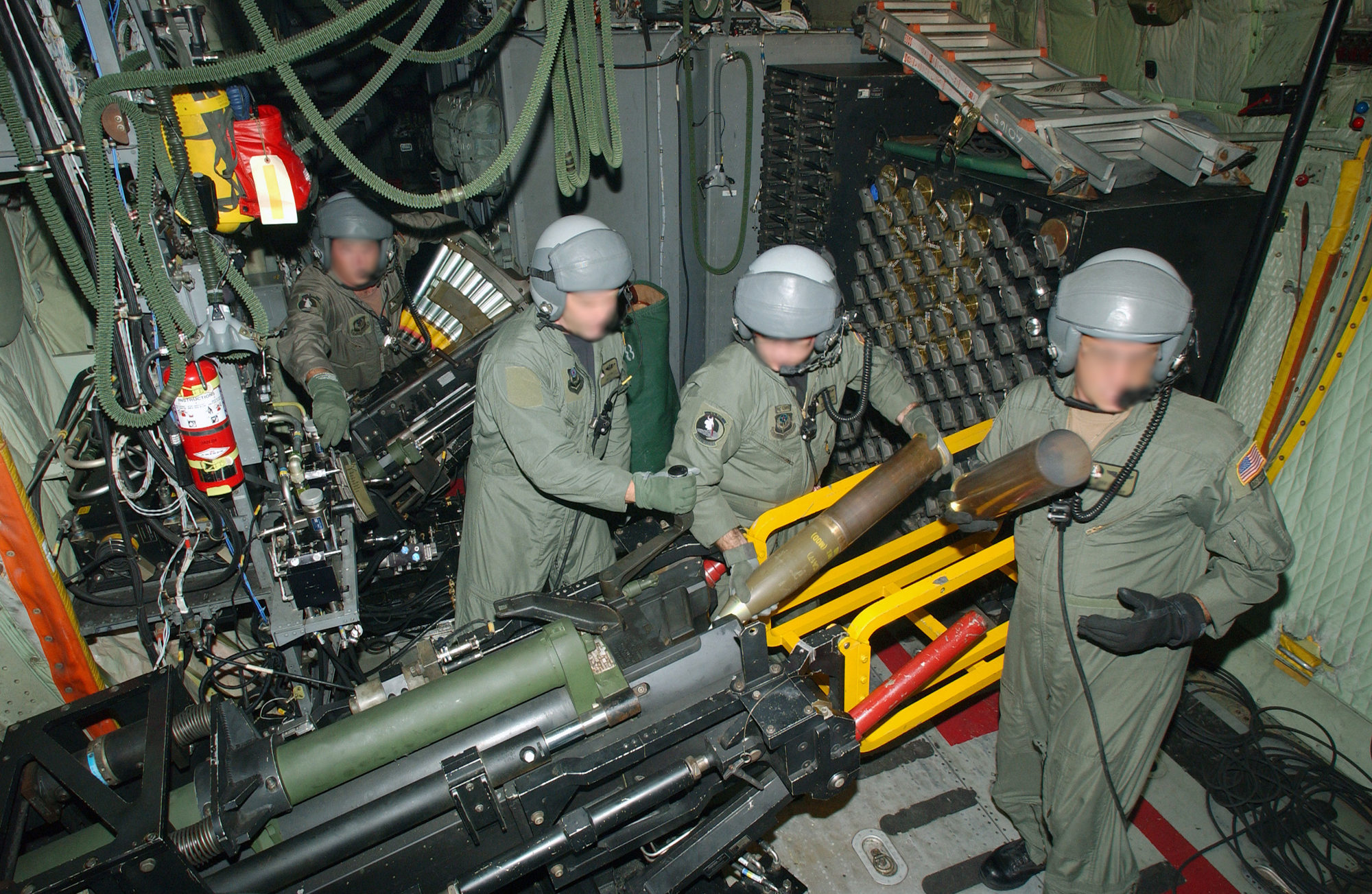
Gunners loading 40 mm cannon (background) and 105 mm cannon (foreground)

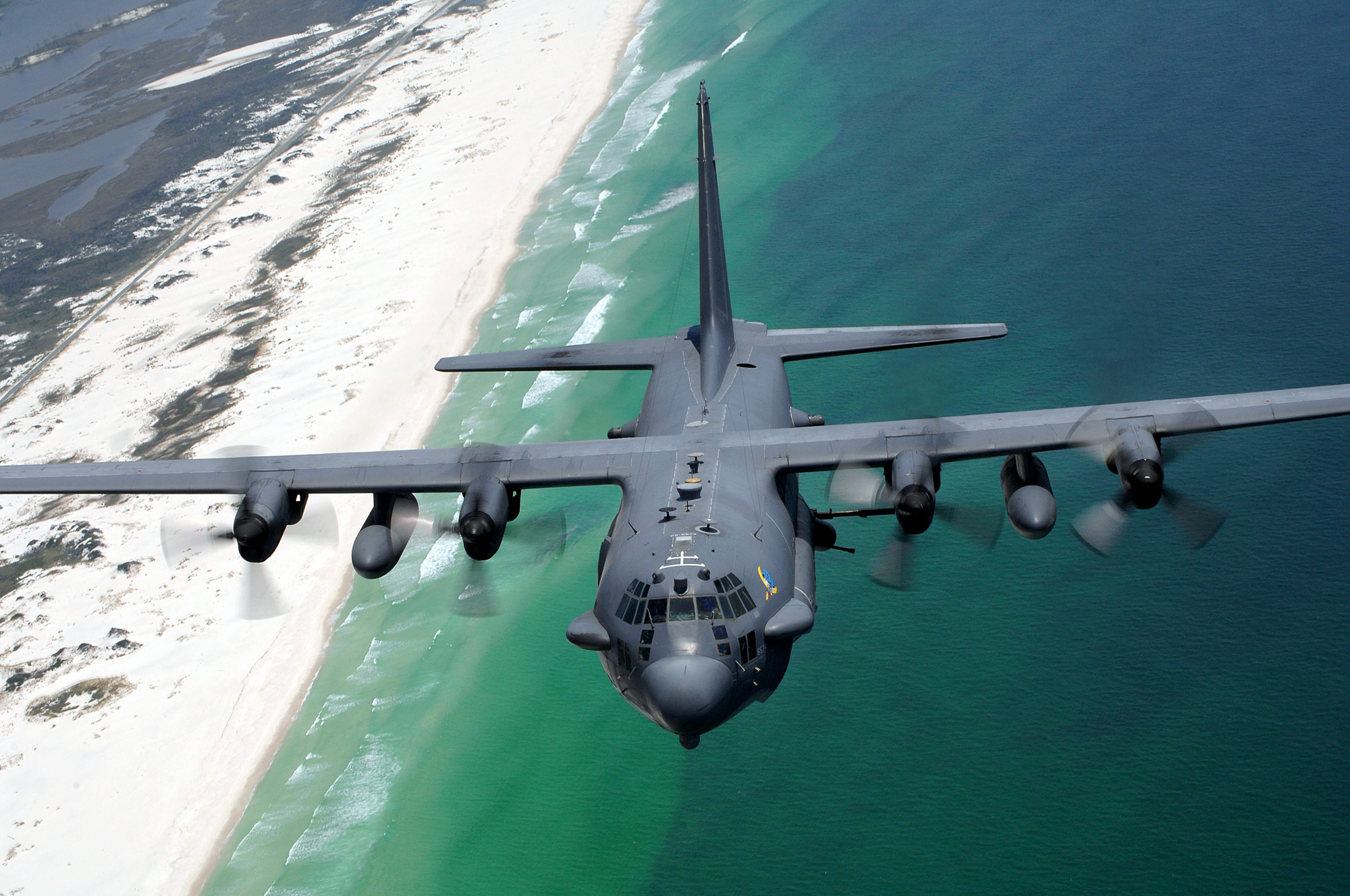
AC-130H Spectre over Santa Rosa Island, Northwest Florida coast.

== See also ==
Related development

- Lockheed C-130 Hercules
- Lockheed Martin C-130J Super Hercules

Aircraft of comparable role, configuration, and era

- Douglas AC-47 Spooky
- Fairchild AC-119
- ATK AC-235

Related lists

- List of accidents and incidents involving the Lockheed C-130 Hercules
- List of active United States military aircraft
- List of Lockheed aircraft
- List of military electronics of the United States

== Bibliography ==
- Hobson, Chris (2001), Vietnam Air Losses: United States Air Force, Navy and Marine Corps Fixed-Wing Aircraft Losses in Southeast Asia, 1961–1973, Hinckley, England, UK: Midland, ISBN 1-85780-115-6
