= M102 howitzer =

M102
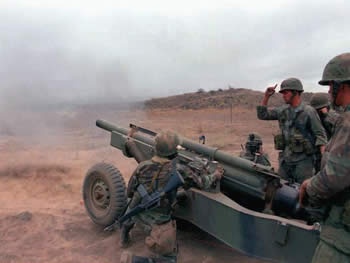
- The M102 howitzer firing
- Type: Howitzer
- Place of origin: United States

Service history
- In service: 1964–present
- Wars: Vietnam War; Cambodian Civil War; Invasion of Grenada; Gulf War; Kosovo War; Iraq War; Lebanese Civil War; Salvadoran Civil War

Production history
- Designed: 1962
- Manufacturer: Rock Island Arsenal

Specifications
- Mass: 1,496 kg (3,298 lb)
- Length: Travel: 6.40 m (21 ft)
- Barrel length: 3.36 m (11 ft 0 in) L/32
- Width: Travel: 1.96 m (6 ft 5 in)
- Height: Travel: 1.59 m (5 ft 3 in)
- Crew: 8
- Shell: 105 × 372 mm R
- Caliber: 105 mm (4.1 in)
- Action: Vertical sliding-wedge
- Recoil: Hydro-pneumatic
- Carriage: Box trail
- Elevation: −5° to +75°
- Traverse: 360°
- Rate of fire: Maximum: 10 rpm Normal: 3 rpm
- Effective firing range: 11.5 km (7.1 miles)
- Maximum firing range: 15.1 km (9.4 miles) with rocket-assisted projectile

The M102 is a light, towable 105 mm howitzer used by the United States Army in the Vietnam War, the Gulf War, and the Iraq War.

== Overview ==
The M102 105 mm howitzer is used in air mobile (helicopter), attack plane, and light infantry operations. The weapon carriage is lightweight welded aluminum, mounted on a variable recoil mechanism. The weapon is manually loaded and positioned, and can be towed by a 2-ton truck or High Mobility Multipurpose Wheeled Vehicle (HMMWV), can be transported by UH-60 Black Hawk helicopters, or can be dropped by parachute with airborne units. When emplaced, the howitzer's high volume of fire compensates in large measure for the lower explosive weight of the projectile compared to the Army's 155 mm and 203 mm howitzers. Since 1964, the Army acquired 1,150 M102 towed howitzers. The weapon is being replaced by the M119-series 105 mm howitzer.

=== Resistance to change ===
Units were initially equipped with the M101A1 howitzer, virtually the same 105 mm howitzer that had been used to support U.S. forces since World War II. In 1966 a new 105 mm towed howitzer, the M102, was received in Vietnam. The first M102s were issued to the 1st Battalion, 21st Field Artillery, in March 1966. Replacement of the old howitzers continued steadily over the next four years.

As per our reference, “[m]any of the more seasoned artillerymen did not want the old cannon replaced. Over the years they had become familiar with its every detail and were confident that it would not disappoint them in the clutch. These experienced artillerymen could offer some seemingly convincing reasons why the M101 was still the superior weapon: its waist-high breech made it easier to load; it had higher ground clearance when in tow; but most important, it was considerably less expensive than the M102. Their arguments, however, were futile.”

The new M102 was substantially lighter, weighing little more than 1.5 short tons (1.4 t) whereas the M101A1 weighed approximately 2.5 short tons (2.3 t); as a result, more ammunition could be carried during heliborne operations, and a 3/4-ton truck rather than a 2½-ton truck was its prime mover for ground operations. Another major advantage of the M102 was that it could be traversed a full 360°; the M101A1 had a limited on-carriage traverse, which required its trails (stabilizing legs) to be shifted if further traverse was necessary. The M102 fires the same semi-fixed ammunition as the M101, but its longer barrel (32 calibres versus 22 calibres on M101) allows a slightly higher muzzle velocity and thus enhanced firing range. A low silhouette made the new weapon a more difficult target for the enemy, an advantage that far outweighed the disadvantage of being somewhat less convenient to load.

== Design ==
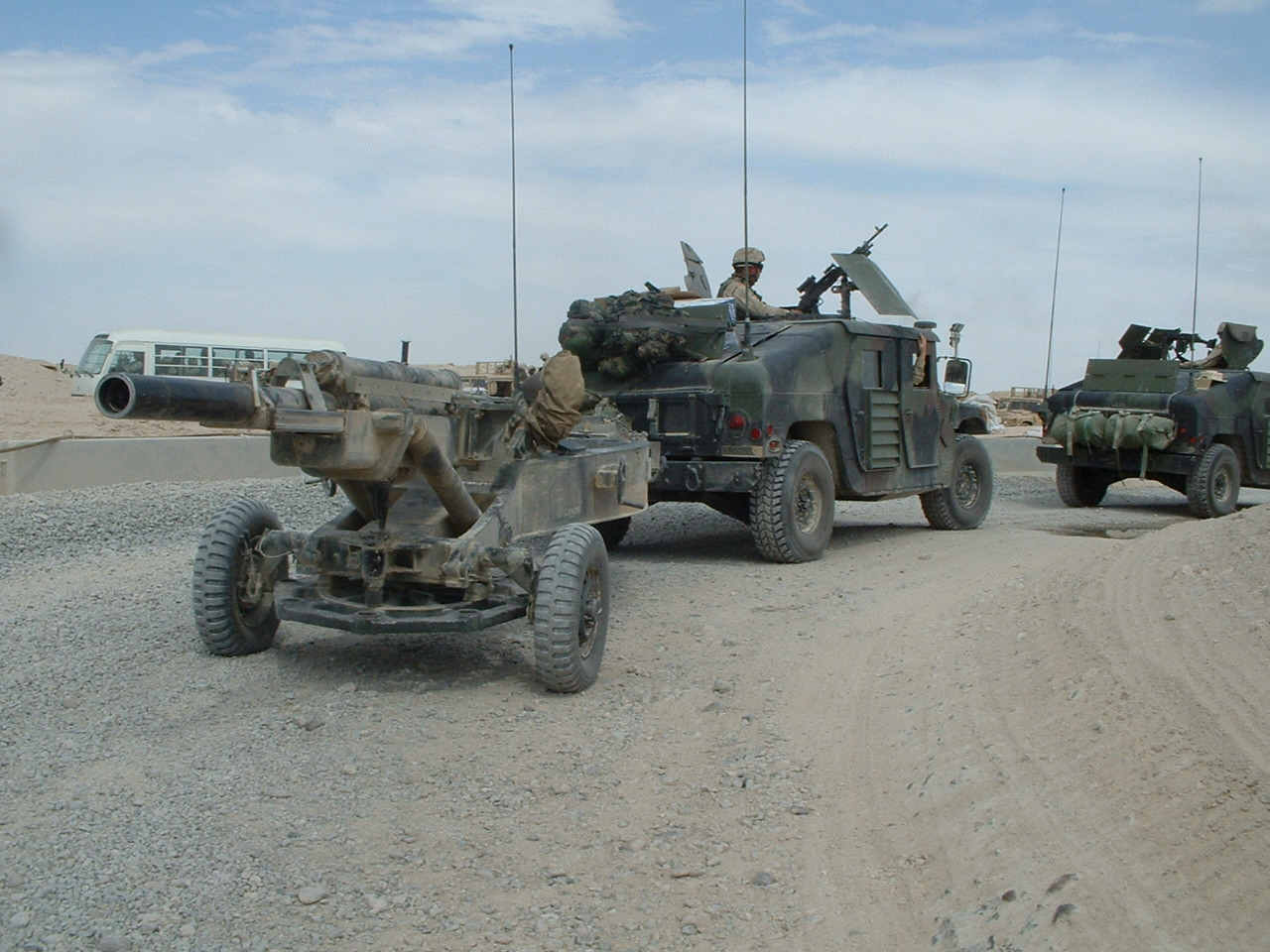
M102 howitzer belonging to Battery A, 1-206th FA, is towed north from Camp New York, Kuwait by a M1114 Up-Armored HMMWV.

The 105 mm howitzer M102 is a lightweight towed weapon, which has a very low silhouette when in the firing position. The M102 howitzer fires a 33 lb (15 kg) projectile of semifixed ammunition and at charge 7 it will fire to 11.5 km (7.1 mi). It has a muzzle velocity of 494 m/s (1,620 ft/s). The maximum rate of fire is 10 rounds per minute for the first 3 minutes, with a sustained rate of 3 rounds per minute.

A roller tire attached to the trail assembly of the M102 permits the weapon to be rotated 6,400 mils (360 degrees) around a firing platform, which provides the pivot for the weapon. It can be elevated from −89 mils (−5 degrees) to a maximum of 1,333 mils (75 degrees). The panoramic telescope has a four power, fixed focus optical system, with 178 mils (10 degrees) field of view. It contains dry nitrogen gas to retard fogging and condensation. The parallax shield used during boresighting protects the lens.

The trails are made of aluminum alloy. They are a single box trail in wishbone shape, and serve three purposes: mobility; stability; and stowage of section equipment. The lunette is the towing pintle that allows the weapon to be connected to the vehicle. When towing, vehicle has a fixed or seized tow pintle; remove the lock plate located under the lunette. The drawbar has two positions: lowered for travel and raised for firing. There are two lifting brackets to connect slings to when the howitzer is being lifted by helicopter. A third bracket is located on front yoke. The carriage handles are used by crew members to lifting and shifting the howitzer during loading, unloading, and emplacing the howitzer.

The firing platform attaches to the howitzer lower carriage by using a socket and a locking handle. The eight holes are for the stakes needed to stake the howitzer in position. Platform stakes are issued in three sizes. There are four 15 in (38 cm) stakes issued for use in frozen or rocky terrain, and are normally issued only where needed, such as extremely cold areas. There are eight 24 in (61 cm) stakes issued, and are used for hard packed ground. Four 38 in (0.97 m) stakes are issued for use in soft ground.

The first production versions were displayed with a muzzle brake, most likely to allow long range 105 mm rounds to be fired, but was discontinued before shipment to Vietnam.

== Current usage ==
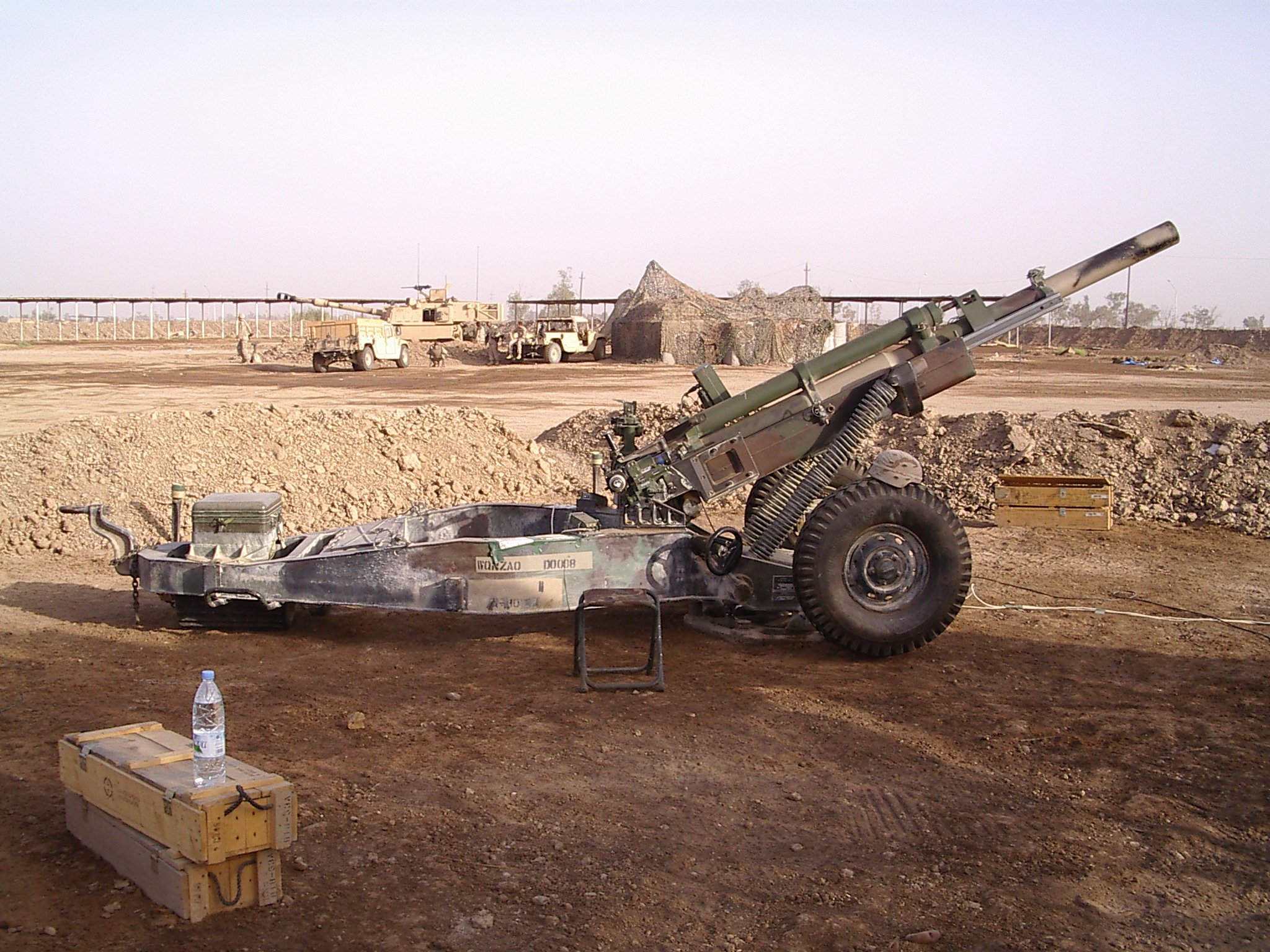
102 Howitzer belonging to Battery A, 1st Battalion, 206th Field Artillery, 39th Brigade Combat Team, in position at Camp Taji, Iraq 29 May 2004

While the M102 is no longer in active use by the United States Army, having been replaced by the M119, it is still in use by the National Guard. The M102 was last deployed to combat in 2004 by the 1st Battalion, 206th Field Artillery, Arkansas Army National Guard. Seventeen M102 howitzers were deployed to Camp Taji, Iraq. The 1-206th FA provided fire and conducted counter-fire missions in support of 39th BCT operations, an element of the 1st Cavalry Division. The 1-206th scavenged spare parts from nine M102 howitzers that were located in the Camp Taji Boneyard. These howitzers were allegedly captured by the Iraqi Army during the Iran–Iraq War in the 1980s.

The M102 is also used on the United States Air Force's Lockheed AC-130 gunship. The M102 105 mm cannon was modified to be fired from the left rear side door of the AC-130. To accommodate the cannon, the rear side-firing 40 mm guns were replaced by the radome that formerly had been installed in the door cavity. That change provided enough space for the 105 mm gun to be mounted in the doorway in place of the radome. The gun was first used in the later stages of the Vietnam War. The latest AC-130J Ghostrider gunship was not originally planned to include the 105 mm, but designed with enough spare power and room to mount it at some later point. The Air Force decided to include it in January 2015, starting installation on the third aircraft, then having the first two be retrofitted when guns become available; M102s will be pulled off retiring AC-130Us and put into the AC-130Js.

The M102 is used in extremely limited roles by the United States Marine Corps, primarily for firing salutes.

The Malaysian Army used the M102 during Malaysia's second communist insurgency (1968–1988) to bombard insurgent positions on the Malaysia-Thailand border. The guns were transported by helicopter to remote firing positions. All Malaysian M102s have now been decommissioned and are only used for firing salute.

== Characteristics ==
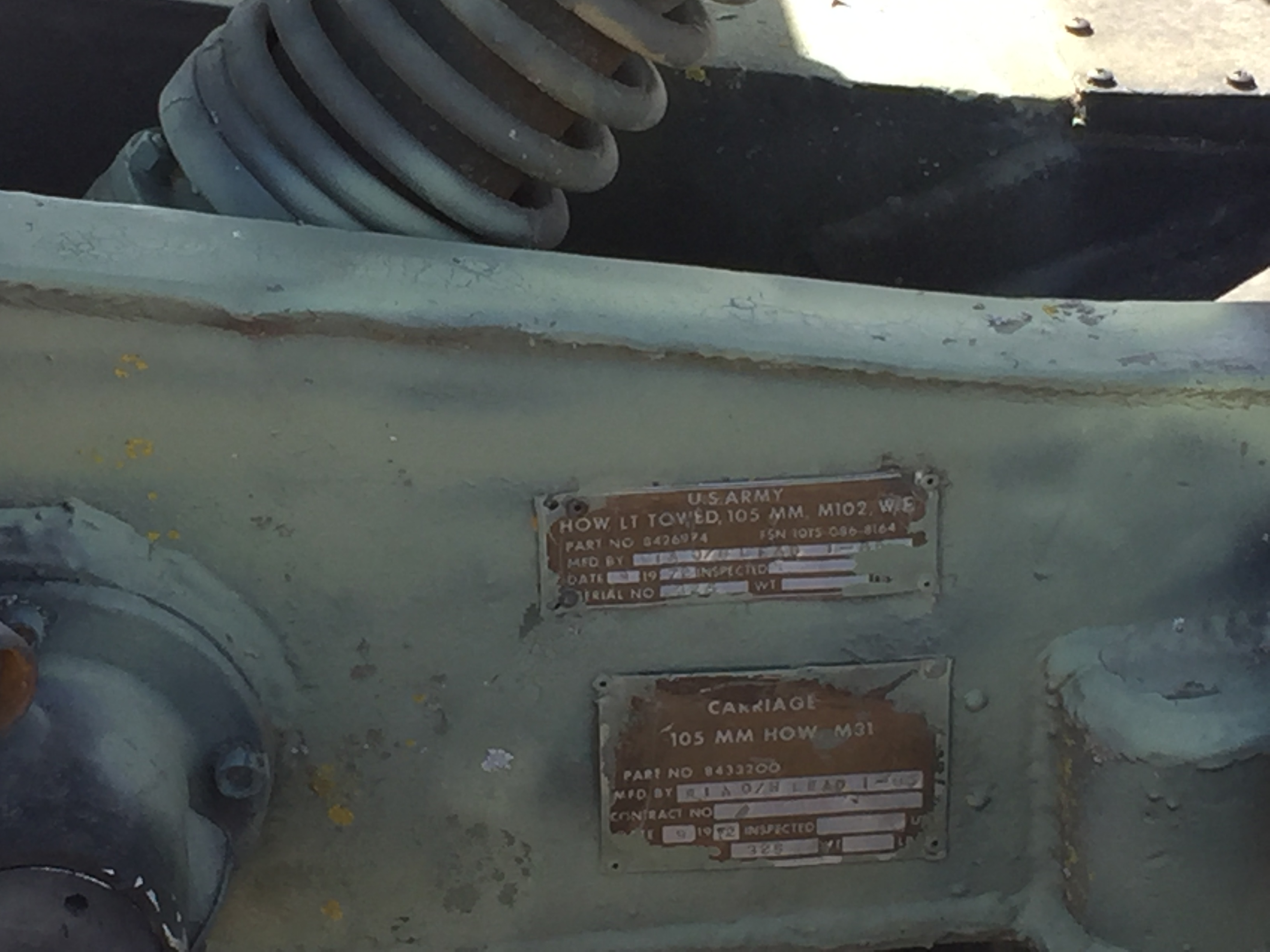
Data plate on an M102 Howitzer

- Caliber: 105 mm (4.13 in)
- Length: 21.8 feet (6.4 m)
- Barrel Length: 32 calibres
- Width: 6.4 feet (2 m)
- Height: 5.2 feet (1.6 m)
- Weight: 1.5 tons (1.4 t)
- Crew: 8
- Rate of fire: 10 rounds per minute maximum, 3 rounds per minute sustained
- Range: 11,500 m (7.1 miles), 15,100 m (9.4 miles) with rocket-assisted projectile

== Operators ==
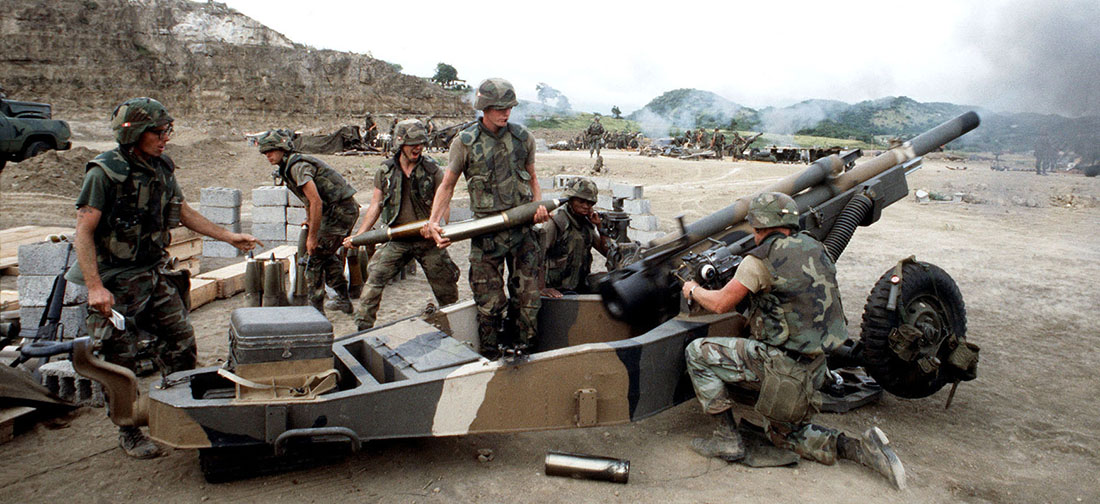
U.S. 82nd Airborne Division firing an M102 howitzer in Grenada, 1983

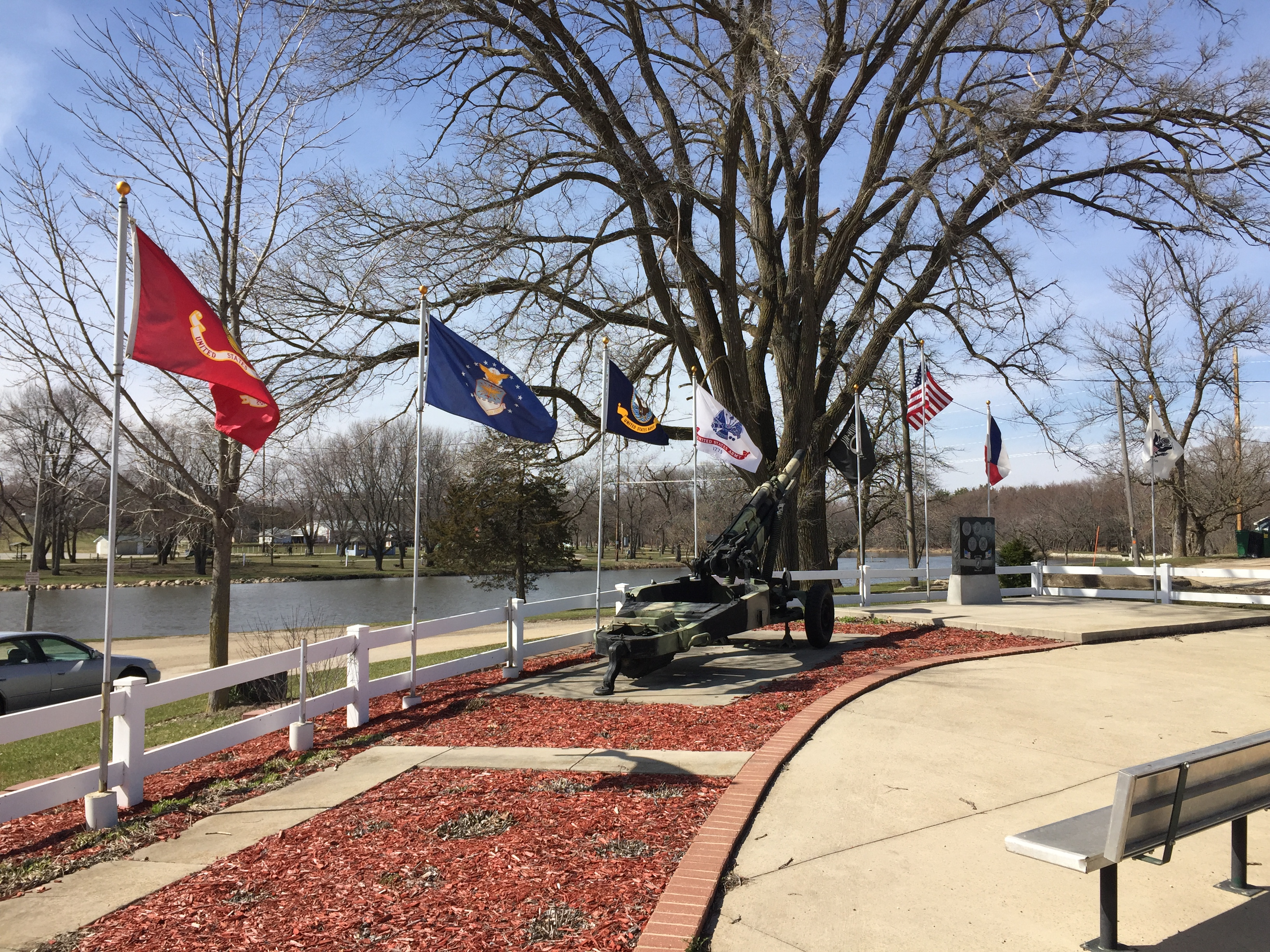
Quasqueton, Iowa Veterans' Memorial with M102 on display

- Brazil 19
- El Salvador 24
- Honduras 24
- Jordan 50
- Kurdistan 84 – Used by the Peshmerga
- Lebanon 18
- Malaysia 40
- Oman 36
- Philippines 24
- Saudi Arabia 140
- Turkey
- Thailand 12
- United States – Used on the AC-130J gunships
- Uruguay 15
- Vietnam – Captured during the Vietnam War

=== Former operators ===
- Khmer Republic
- South Vietnam – Unknown number used by the Republic of Vietnam Airborne Division

== See also ==
- M101 howitzer – previous American 105 mm towed howitzer
- M119 howitzer – current towed 105 mm howitzer in US Army service
- List of artillery
- List of crew served weapons of the US Armed Forces
