= 4th Special Operations Squadron =

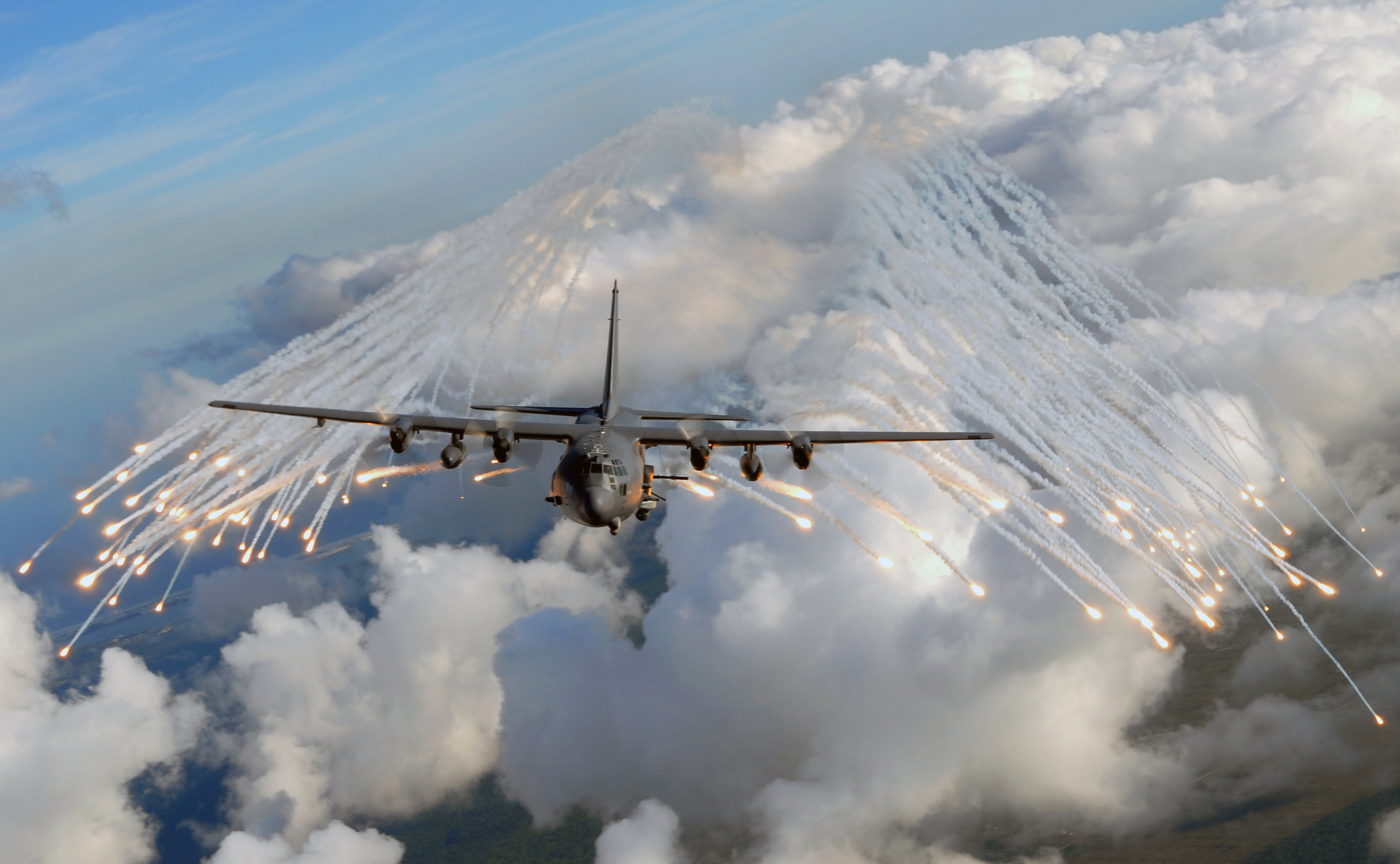
- An AC-130U from the 4th Special Operations Squadron jettisons flares near Hurlburt Field
- Active: 1942–1944; 1949–1954; 1965–1969; 1970–1992; 1995 – present
- Country: United States
- Branch: United States Air Force
- Role: Special Operations
- Part of: Air Force Special Operations Command
- Garrison/HQ: Hurlburt Field
- Nickname: Ghostriders
- Engagements: Vietnam War; Operation Allied Force; Iraq War
- Decorations: Presidential Unit Citation; Air Force Outstanding Unit Award with Combat "V" Device; Air Force Meritorious Unit Award; Air Force Outstanding Unit Award; Republic of Vietnam Gallantry Cross with Palm

Insignia
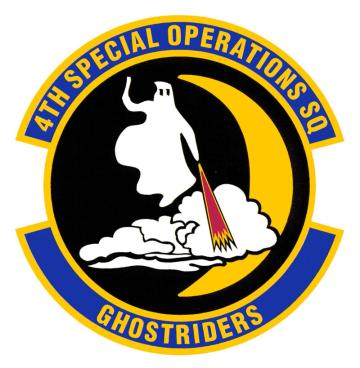
- 4th Special Operations Squadron emblem (approved 20 June 1995)

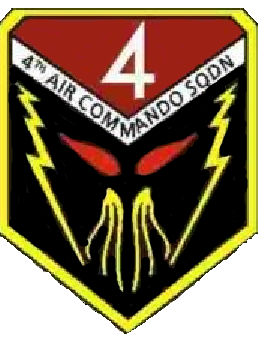
- 4th Air Commando Squadron emblem

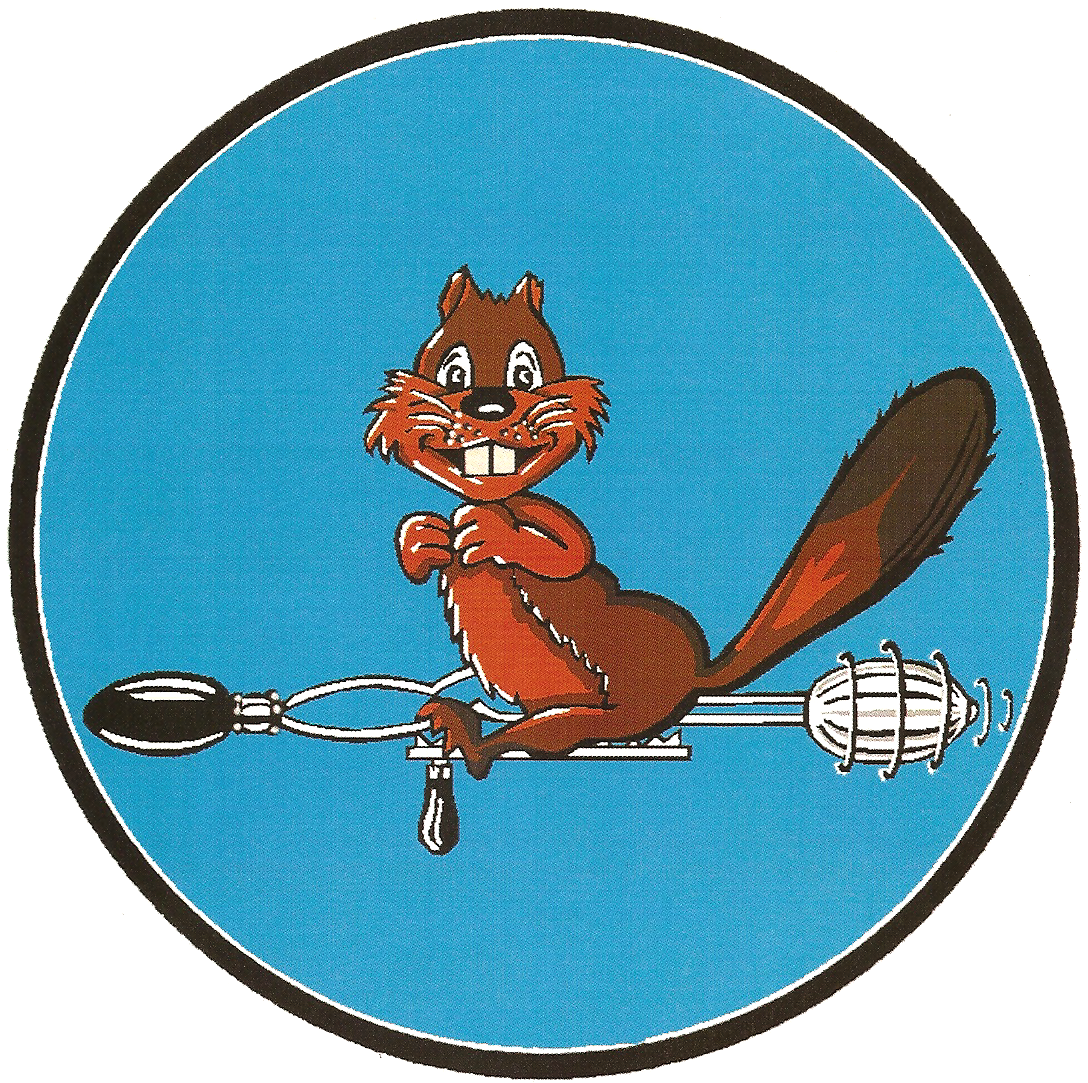
- 4th Liaison Squadron emblem

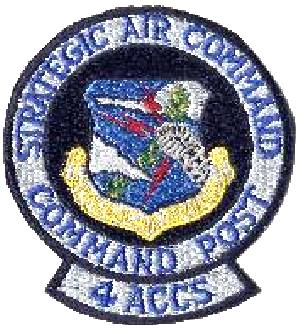
- 4th Airborne Command and Control Squadron emblem

The 4th Special Operations Squadron is part of the 1st Special Operations Wing at Hurlburt Field, Florida. It operates Lockheed AC-130J aircraft providing special operations capabilities.

== Mission ==
The squadron plans, prepares and executes AC-130J gunship missions, providing precise delivery of munitions supporting joint conventional and special operations forces. It directly supports unified and theater special operations commands by conducting close air support, armed aerial reconnaissance, and interdiction missions worldwide in support of Secretary of Defense taskings.

== History ==
=== World War II ===
The first predecessor of the squadron was organized in April 1942 at Logan Field, Maryland. Shortly thereafter, operating from New Castle Army Air Base, Delaware, the 4th ferried aircraft to locations in Alaska, Africa, and Europe under the 2nd Ferrying Group. It also airlifted cargo and evacuated wounded to US military hospitals. However, the Army Air Forces found that standard military units, based on relatively inflexible tables of organization not well adapted to training and support missions. Accordingly, it adopted a more functional system in which each base was organized into a separate numbered unit. The squadron was disbanded in March 1944, and, along with the other elements of the 2d Ferrying Group and support units at New Castle, replaced by the 552d AAF Base Unit (2d Ferrying Group).

=== Light aircraft operations ===
The second predecessor of the squadron was activated at Pope Air Force Base, North Carolina in October 1949 as the 4th Liaison Flight and initially equipped with Stinson L-13 light aircraft. It was expanded to become the 4th Liaison Squadron on 15 July 1952, but was inactivated a week later. However, it was activated the same day at Donaldson Air Force Base, South Carolina, where it was equipped with de Havilland Canada L-20 Beavers. At the beginning of 1953, the squadron moved overseas to Fürstenfeldbruck Air Base, Germany, where it operated the Beavers until inactivating on 8 March 1954.

=== Vietnam War ===
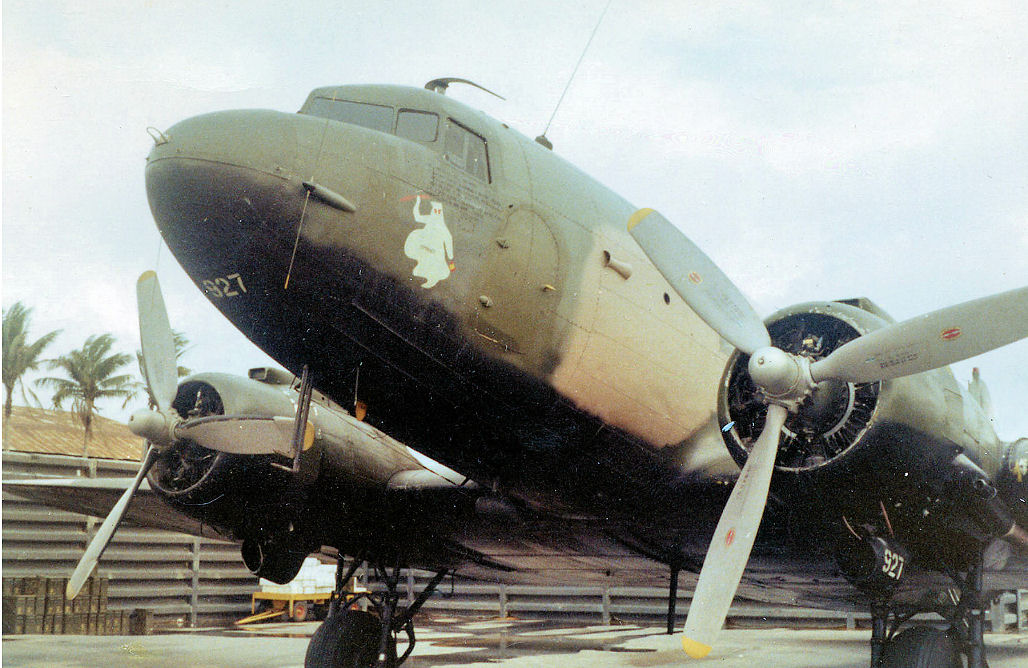
Detail of Douglas AC-47D (S/N 45-0927) of the 4th Air Commando Squadron in February 1968 at Nha Trang Air Base, South Vietnam. This aircraft was reassigned to South Vietnam AF after USAF pullout in 1971.

The third predecessor of the squadron was activated in August 1965 as the 4th Air Commando Squadron. Although nominally stationed at Tan Son Nhut Air Base, South Vietnam, the squadron was organized at Forbes Air Force Base, Kansas, where it trained as the first gunship unit in the Air Force for the next three months. It flew night combat missions in South Vietnam manning the Douglas AC-47 Spooky gunship beginning in November 1965. By year's end, the 4th had flown 277 combat sorties, used 2,458 illumination flares, and expended 137,136 rounds of ammunition in support of friendly positions under attack. In February 1966, four of the squadron's gunships were moved to Thailand to operate against the Ho Chi Minh Trail. There they would serve several roles. They were equipped to assume Airborne Command and Control Center duties in lieu of Lockheed C-130 Hercules aircraft. They both struck and directed forward air control in the Operation Barrel Roll area of Laos. They also hunted supply trucks along the Trail. Between December 1965 and July 1966, they were credited with destroying 243 trucks. However, they lost four AC-47s and 26 air crew members in the process, as enemy anti-aircraft fire became steadily more effective. The 4th was then assigned solely to defense of hamlets and troops under attack.

=== Airborne command and control ===
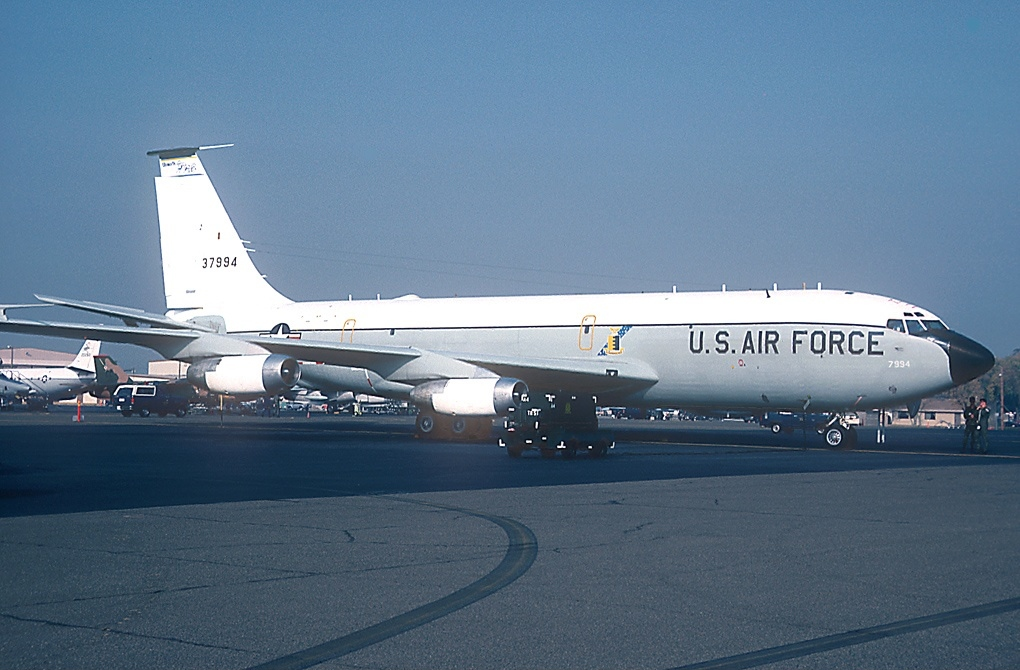
4th ACCS EC-135G Airborne Launch Control Center at Ellsworth AFB, SD

From 1 April 1970 to 30 September 1992, the 4th Airborne Command and Control Squadron, assigned to the 28th Bombardment Wing at Ellsworth Air Force Base, South Dakota, provided airborne command post responsibilities with specially modified Boeing EC-135 airborne command post aircraft for Fifteenth Air Force and Strategic Air Command as part of the Post Attack Command and Control System The 4th was the workhorse of Airborne Launch Control System (ALCS) operations. Three dedicated Airborne Launch Control Centers (ALCC) (pronounced "Al-see"), designated ALCC No. 1, ALCC No. 2, and ALCC No. 3 were on ground alert around-the-clock providing ALCS coverage for five of the six Minuteman intercontinental ballistic missile (ICBM) Wings. These dedicated ALCCs were mostly EC-135A aircraft but sometimes were EC-135C or EC-135G aircraft, depending on availability. ALCC No. 1 was on ground alert at Ellsworth AFB, SD and during a wartime scenario, its role would have been to take off and orbit between the Minuteman Wings at Ellsworth Air Force Base, South Dakota and Francis E. Warren Air Force Base, Wyoming, providing ALCS assistance if needed. ALCCs No. 2 and No. 3 were routinely on forward deployed ground alert at Minot AFB, ND. During a wartime scenario, ALCC No. 3's role would have been to take off and orbit between the Minuteman ICBM Wings at Minot and Grand Forks Air Force Bases, North Dakota, providing ALCS assistance if needed. ALCC No. 2's dedicated role was to take off and orbit near the Minuteman ICBM Wing at Malmstrom Air Force Base, Montana, providing ALCS assistance if needed. The 4th ACCS also maintained an EC-135C or EC-135G on ground alert at Ellsworth as the West Auxiliary Airborne Command Post (WESTAUXCP), which was a backup to SAC's Operation Looking Glass Airborne Command Post (ABNCP), as well as a radio relay link between the Looking Glass and ALCCs when airborne. Although equipped with ALCS, the WESTAUXCP did not have a dedicated Minuteman ICBM wing to provide ALCS assistance to.

=== Special operations ===
In September 1996, the squadron deployed to Brindisi, Italy, supporting Operation Joint Endeavor in the skies over Bosnia and Herzegovina. The squadron saw its first combat operations since the Vietnam War in April 1999 over Kosovo while supporting Operation Allied Force. The 4th was called upon to strike Taliban and Al-Qaeda targets in Afghanistan in the fall of 2001. In the spring of 2003 the 4th participated in the invasion of Iraq. During the initial 2 months of the conflict the 4th flew more than 1000 combat hours from 3 separate forward operating locations.

The squadron received its first AC-130J Ghostrider on March 6, 2019, which are replacing the unit's AC-130U Spooky gunships.

== Lineage ==
4th Ferrying Squadron

- Constituted as the 4th Air Corps Ferrying Squadron on 18 February 1942

Activated on 8 April 1942
Redesignated 4th Ferrying Squadron on 12 May 1943

- Disbanded on 31 March 1944
- Reconstituted and consolidated with 4th Liaison Squadron, 4th Special Operations Squadron and as on 19 September 1985

4th Liaison Squadron

- Constituted as the 4th Liaison Flight on 27 September 1949

Activated on 27 October 1949
Redesignated 4th Liaison Squadron on 15 July 1952
Inactivated on 22 July 1952

- Activated on 22 July 1952

Inactivated on 8 March 1954

- Reconstituted and consolidated with 4th Ferrying Squadron, 4th Special Operations Squadron and 4th Airborne Command and Control Squadron as 4th Airborne Command and Control Squadron on 19 September 1985

4th Special Operations Squadron

- Constituted as the 4th Air Commando Squadron (Fire Support) and activated on 2 August 1965 (not organized)

Organized on 8 August 1965
Redesignated 4th Special Operations Squadron on 1 August 1968
Inactivated on 15 December 1969

- Consolidated with 4th Ferrying Squadron, 4th Liaison Squadron and 4th Airborne Command and Control Squadron as 4th Airborne Command and Control Squadron on 19 September 1985

4th Airborne Command and Control Squadron

- Constituted as the 4th Airborne Command and Control Squadron on 12 March 1970

Activated on 1 April 1970

- Consolidated with 4th Ferrying Squadron, 4th Liaison Squadron and 4th Special Operations Squadron on 19 September 1985

Inactivated on 30 September 1992

Consolidated squadron

- Redesignated 4th Special Operations Squadron on 13 February 1995

Activated on 1 May 1995

=== Assignments ===
- Northeast Sector, Air Corps Ferrying Command (later 2d Ferrying Group), 8 April 1942 – 31 March 1944
- Fourteenth Air Force, 27 October 1949
- Tactical Air Command, 1 August 1950
- Ninth Air Force, 14 August 1950 – 22 July 1952
- Eighteenth Air Force, 22 July 1952
- Twelfth Air Force, 13 February 1953 – 8 March 1954
- Pacific Air Forces, 2 August 1965 (not organized)
- 2d Air Division, 8 August 1965 (attached to 6250 Combat Support Group until 1 March 1966)
- 14th Air Commando Wing (later 14 Special Operations Wing), 8 March 1966 – 15 December 1969
- 28th Bombardment Wing, 1 April 1970
- 28th Operations Group, 1 September 1991 – 30 September 1992
- 16th Operations Group (later 1st Special Operations Group), 1 May 1995 – present

=== Stations ===
- Logan Field, Maryland, 8 April 1942
- New Castle Army Air Base, Delaware, c. 25 May 1942 – 31 March 1944
- Pope Air Force Base, North Carolina, 27 October 1949 – 22 July 1952 (deployed to Camp Mackall, North Carolina (14 April – 4 May 1950, Fort Hood, Texas (14 March – 7 April 1952)
- Donaldson Air Force Base, South Carolina, 22 July 1952 – 23 January 1953
- Fürstenfeldbruck Air Base, Germany, 10 February 1953 – 8 March 1954

- Tan Son Nhut Air Base, South Vietnam, 8 August 1965 (deployed at Forbes Air Force Base, Kansas until c. 1 November 1965)
- Nha Trang Air Base, South Vietnam, 1 June 1966
- Phan Rang Air Base, South Vietnam, 1 October–15 December 1969
- Ellsworth Air Force Base, South Dakota, 1 April 1970 – 30 September 1992
- Hurlburt Field, Florida, 1 May 1995 – present

=== Aircraft ===
- Ferried a variety of aircraft, many assigned to other units (1942–1944)
- Stinson L-13 (1949–1951, 1951–1952)
- Beechcraft C-45 Expeditor (1951–1952)
- de Havilland Canada L-20 Beaver (1952, 1952–1953)
- Douglas FC-47 (later AC-47) Spooky (1965–1969)
- Douglas C-47 Skytrain (1966–1967)
- Douglas HC-47 Skytrain (1969)
- Boeing EC-135 (1970–1992)
- Lockheed AC-130U Spooky II (1995 - 2019)
- Lockheed AC-130J Ghostrider (2019 – present)

== See also ==
- Airborne Launch Control Center
- Airborne Launch Control System
- Post Attack Command and Control System
