= Robert G. Emmens =

U.S. Air force officer (1914–1992)

Robert Gabel Emmens
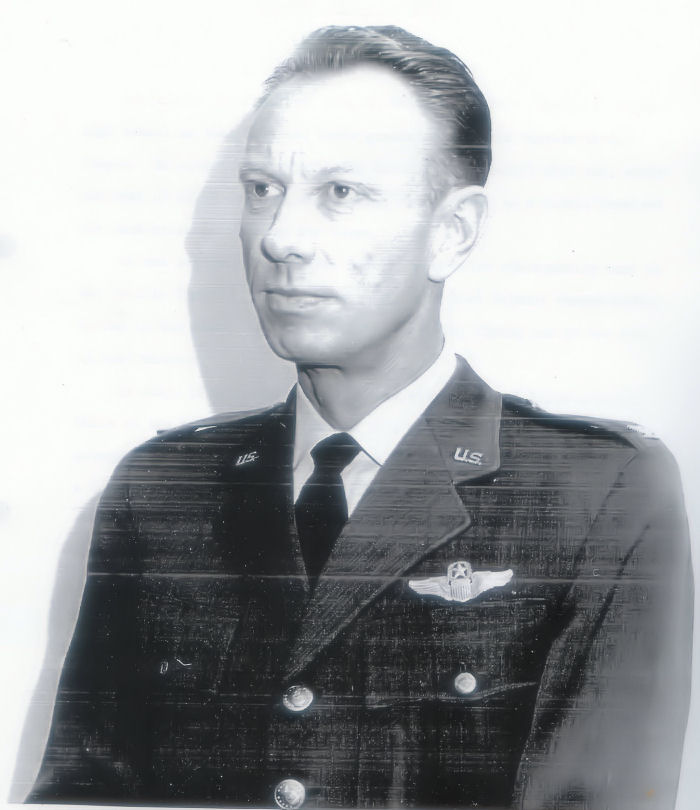
- Colonel Robert G. Emmens, 1956
- Born: July 22, 1914; Medford, Oregon, U.S.
- Died: April 2, 1992 (aged 77); Medford, Oregon, U.S.
- Burial place: Medford IOOF Cemetery; Medford, Oregon
- Military career
- Allegiance: United States of America
- Branch: United States Army Air Corps; United States Army Air Forces; United States Air Force
- Service years: 1937–1964
- Rank: Colonel
- Nickname: Bob
- Unit: 89th Reconnaissance Squadron
- Commands: 494th Bomb Squadron; 342d Fighter Day Wing; 354th Fighter-Day Wing; Office of Special Investigations District 20
- Conflicts: World War II • Doolittle Raid
- Awards: Distinguished Flying Cross
- Other work: Stockbroker; Real estate agent

Robert Gabel Emmens (July 22, 1914 – April 2, 1992) was a Doolittle Raider and a career United States Air Force officer.

== Biography ==
Emmens was born on July 22, 1914, in Medford, Oregon, to Jacelyn and Fannie Emmens. He graduated from Medford High School in Medford, Oregon in 1931 and then attended University of Oregon from 1931 to 1934.

== Military career ==
Emmens entered the United States Army Air Corps on February 23, 1937, at Vancouver Barracks in Washington. He graduated from Flying Training School with a rating of pilot, February, 1938. He was then assigned to 89th Reconnaissance Squadron at March Field in California.

In February 1942, Emmens volunteered for a "secret mission", even though he did not know what duties were involved or any other details. This mission ended up being the critical Doolittle Raid.

=== Doolittle Raid ===
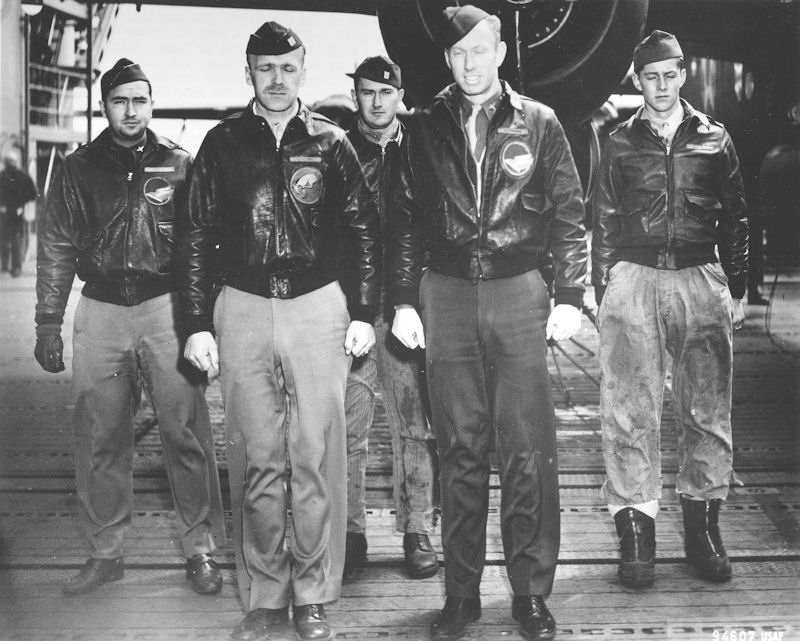
Crew No. 8 in front of B-25#40-2242, on the deck of Hornet, 18 April 1942. From left to right: (front row) Capt. Edward J. York, pilot; Lt. Robert G. Emmens, copilot; (back row) Lt. Nolan A. Herndon, navigator/bombardier; SSgt. Theodore H. Laban, flight engineer; Sgt. David W. Pohl, gunner.

As a first lieutenant, Emmens joined the Tokyo mission just before the mission. he was a co-pilot on one of the 16 B-25 Mitchell bombers under the command of Colonel James H. Doolittle that were left the carrier USS Hornet (CV-8) to carry out the Tokyo raid on April 18, 1942. Emmens' B-25 was Serial 40-2242 and was the eighth one to take off.

All of those 16 crews except Lieutenant Emmens' either crashed on the China coast or bailed out. His B-25 was consuming fuel at a much higher rate than planned on the mission, possibly due to incorrect engine carburetor settings. As a result, after attacking the target successfully in Japan, the plane turned north and touched down in a large field 40 miles (64 km) north of Vladivostok in the Soviet Union. Doolittle had specifically told the Raiders not to fly to Russia.

=== Internment and escape ===
The Soviet Union, which was not then at war with Japan, held the crewmen captive for 13 months. Colonel Emmens later wrote a book about his experience as a captive, "Guests of the Kremlin." After landing in Vladivostok, Emmens wrote that the Soviets held its five crewmen in several locations in the Soviet Union. Limited to the same diet as the besieged Soviet people, mostly black bread and cabbage, the five crew members suffered malnutrition, dysentery and other medical problems.

Rather than wait until the end of the war under deplorable conditions, the crew resolved to escape. While held in Ashkhabad, near the Persian border–thousands of miles from Vladivostok–they found a sympathetic Soviet officer. The man introduced them to an Afghan smuggler who supplied the officers with better food and other black market items. Crewmen paid the smuggler $250–won in a poker game the night before the mission by the pilot, Edward J. York, to lead them to a British embassy in Iran. The five, with the help of British diplomats in Mashhad, made their way to India and got a flight to the United States.

The B-25 aircraft was kept by the Soviets, and was scrapped in the 1950s.

=== Post war ===
After his return to the United States, Emmens attended and graduated from the Army Command and Staff School in Fort Leavenworth. He was then assigned as commander of the 494th Bomb Squadron at Lakeland, Florida, from July to August 1943, and then as the operations officer and then deputy commander of the 334th Bomb Group at Greenville Army Air Base, from August 1943 to September 1944. He was Deputy Base Commander at Greenville AAB from September to December 1944, and then military attaché and air attaché to Romania from December 1944 to January 1948.

Emmens then served at Headquarters United States Air Force at the Pentagon from April 1948 to July 1950, when he was transferred to Salzburg, Austria, as an intelligence officer. He then served as an intelligence officer with Headquarters Tactical Air Command at Langley Air Force Base, from July 1953 to June 1955, followed by duty with the commander of the 342d Fighter Day Wing, the first host unit at Myrtle Beach Air Force Base, and later as vice-commander of the 354th Fighter-Day Wing, which replaced the 342d FDW as the base's permanent host unit. During his supervision, construction was performed at a rapid pace.

Emmens began training for duty as an Air Attaché to Japan. He served as Air Attaché to Japan from June 1958 to September 1961, and then served as commander of the Office of Special Investigations District 20 at McChord Air Force Base, from September 1961 to August 1963. Emmens retired from the Air Force on June 10, 1964.

== Later life ==
Emmens was married to Justine Emmens, née Miller (1915–2006). They had three children.

After his retirement, Robert Emmens returned to Medford, Oregon, his home town, and worked as a stockbroker and in real estate. Emmens died on April 2, 1992, due to cancer. He is interred at the Medford IOOF Cemetery and is a stop along the popular free public tour of the historic site which is managed by the City of Medford Parks and Recreation Department.

== Awards and decorations ==
Colonel Emmens' decorations include the Distinguished Flying Cross and Chinese Army, Navy, Air Corps Medal, Class A, 1st Grade, and the Japanese Order of the Sacred Treasure.

Command Pilot
Distinguished Flying Cross
Army Commendation Medal	Prisoner of War Medal	American Defense Service Medal
American Campaign Medal	Asiatic-Pacific Campaign Medal with bronze campaign star	European–African–Middle Eastern Campaign Medal
World War II Victory Medal	Army of Occupation Medal	National Defense Service Medal with bronze service star
Air Force Longevity Service Award with silver and bronze oak leaf clusters	Medal of the Armed Forces, A-1 (Republic of China)	War Memorial Medal (Republic of China)
