= Fort Sam Houston National Cemetery =

Historic veterans cemetery in Bexar County, Texas

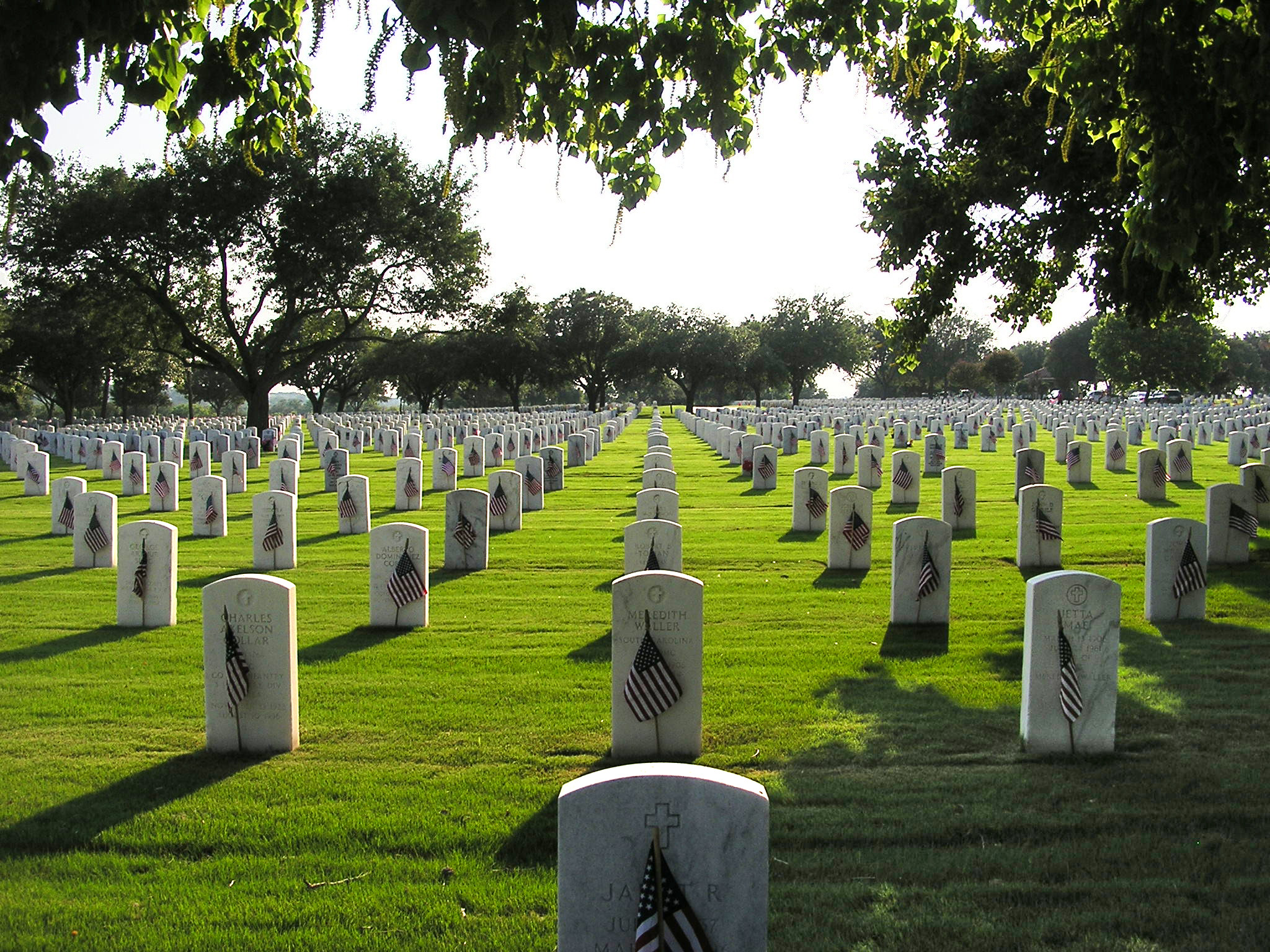
- Fort Sam Houston National Cemetery, Memorial Day 2019.
- Interactive map of Fort Sam Houston National Cemetery

Details
- Established: 1926
- Location: San Antonio, Texas
- Country: United States
- Coordinates: 29°28′32″N 98°25′27″W
- Type: United States National Cemetery
- Owned by: U.S. Department of Veterans Affairs
- Size: 154.7 acres (62.6 ha)
- No. of graves: >170,000
- Website: Official

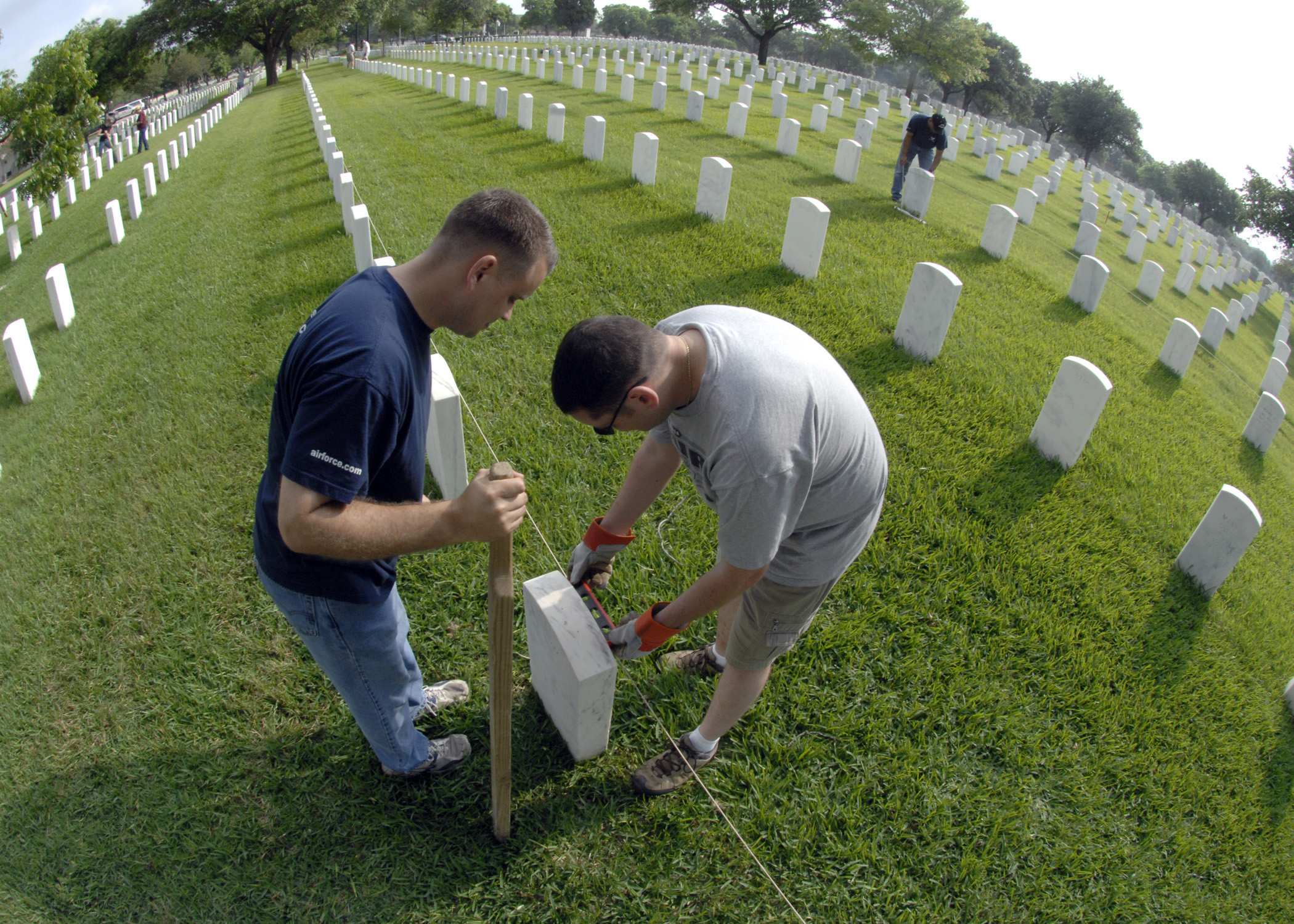
A crew works to straighten gravestones at Fort Sam Houston National Cemetery.

Fort Sam Houston National Cemetery is a United States National Cemetery in San Antonio, Texas. Administered by the United States Department of Veterans Affairs, it encompasses 154.7 acres (62.6 ha), and as of 2014, had over 144,000 interments. The cemetery was listed on the National Register of Historic Places in 2016.

== History ==
Although the Army post in the area was established in 1875, and construction of Fort Sam Houston began the following year, no burials were made in the area that is currently the cemetery until 1926. In 1931 60 acres (24 ha) were added as an addition to San Antonio National Cemetery. In 1937, the addition became a National Cemetery in its own right, renamed Fort Sam Houston National Cemetery. In 1947 several other forts in Texas, including Fort McIntosh, were closed and their cemetery interments were transferred to Fort Sam Houston National Cemetery.

Interred at the Fort Sam Houston National Cemetery are 140 Axis prisoners of war (POWs) from World War II who died in captivity. 133 are German, 4 are Italian, and 3 are Japanese. These POWs were disinterred from various Texas POW camps and reburied at Fort Sam Houston National Cemetery. When originally interred, these graves were isolated from the American graves.

Two gravestones marked with swastikas were replaced on December 24, 2020. The Military Religious Freedom Foundation had demanded their removal in May 2020, but the Veterans Administration (VA) resisted on the grounds that they were historical. The VA resisted until Senator Ted Cruz (R-TX) and Congressmen Will Hurd (R-TX23) and Kay Granger (R-TX12) put pressure on them.

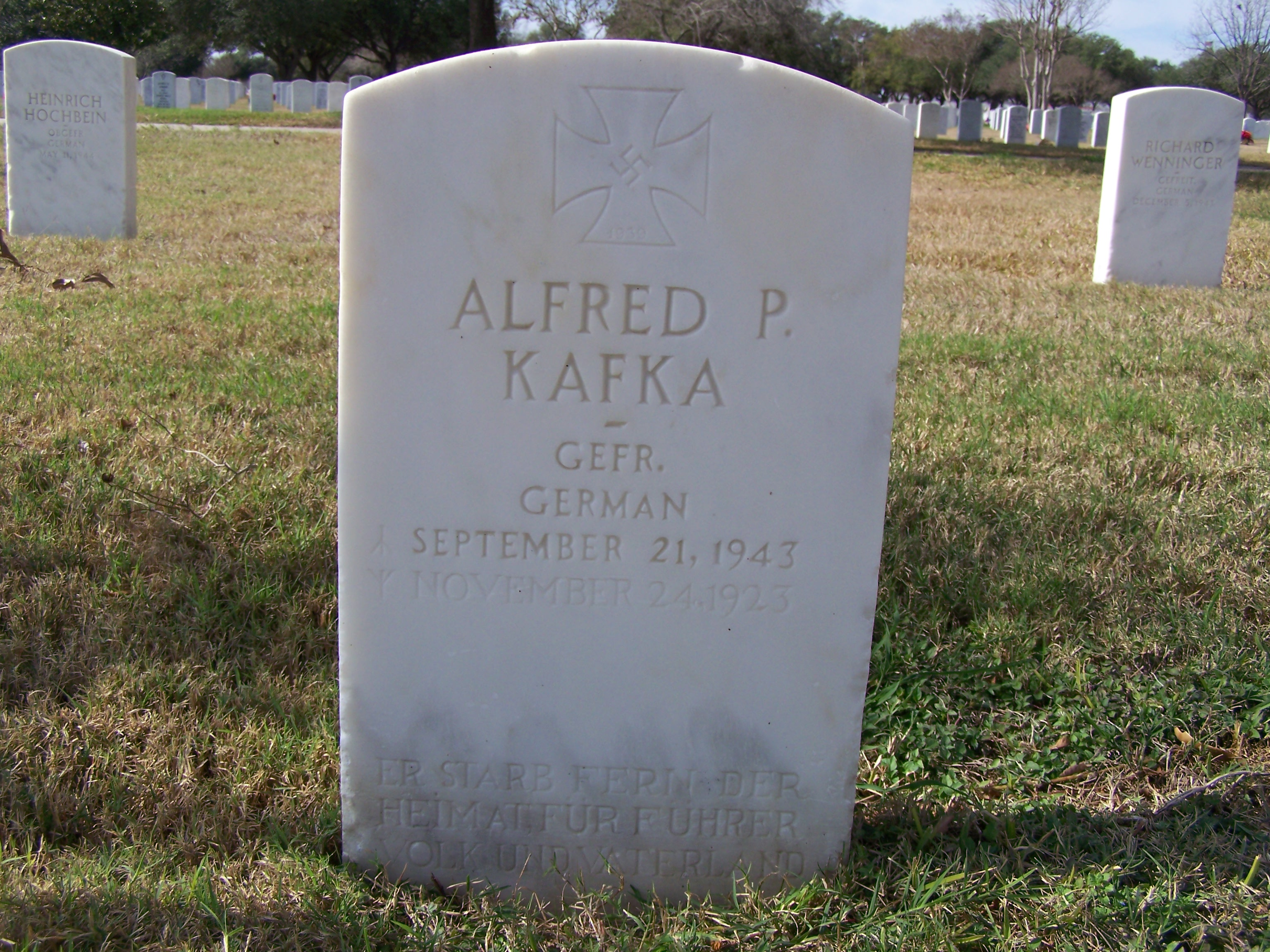
German POW marker, Knights cross recipient

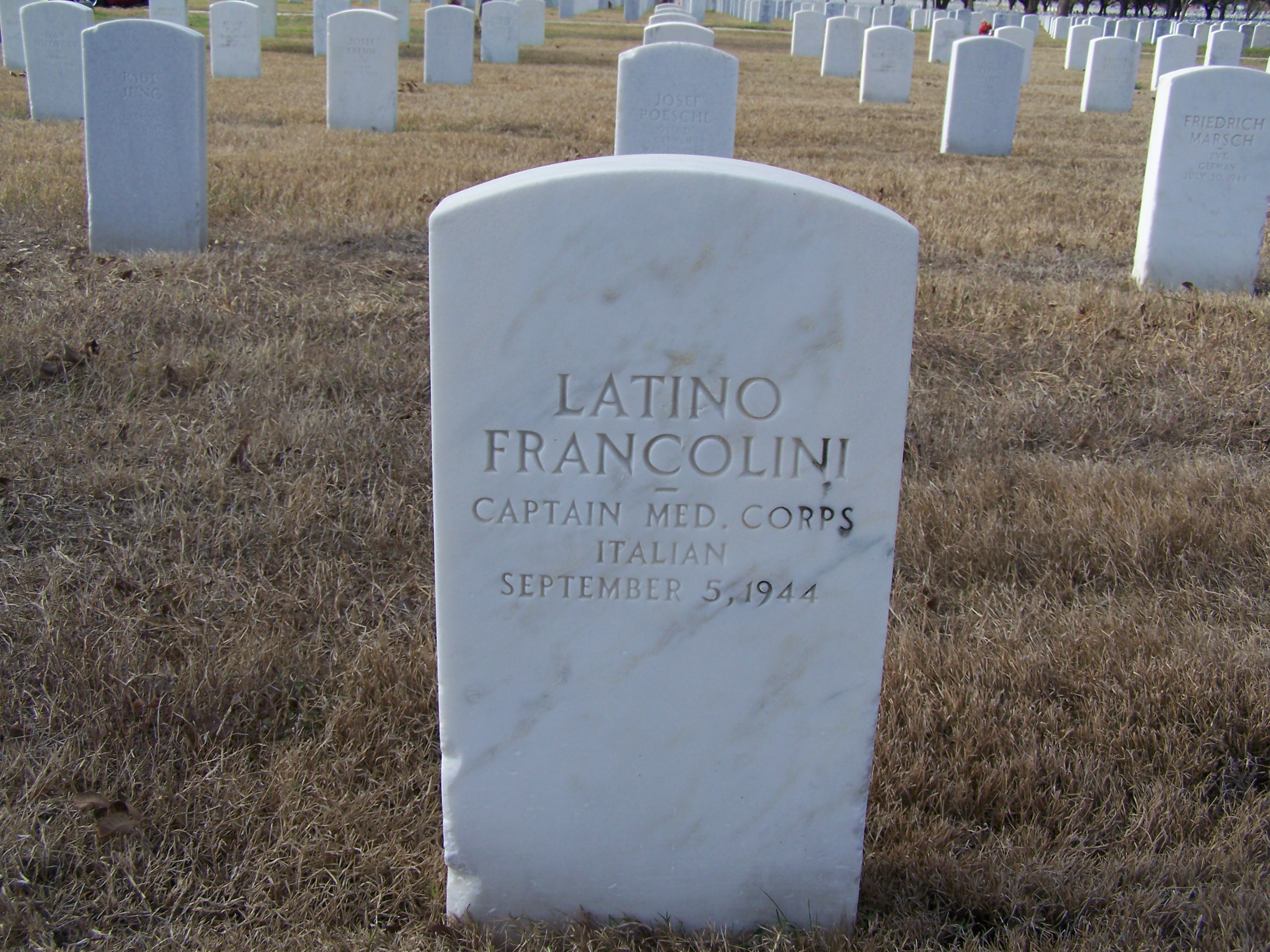
Italian POW marker

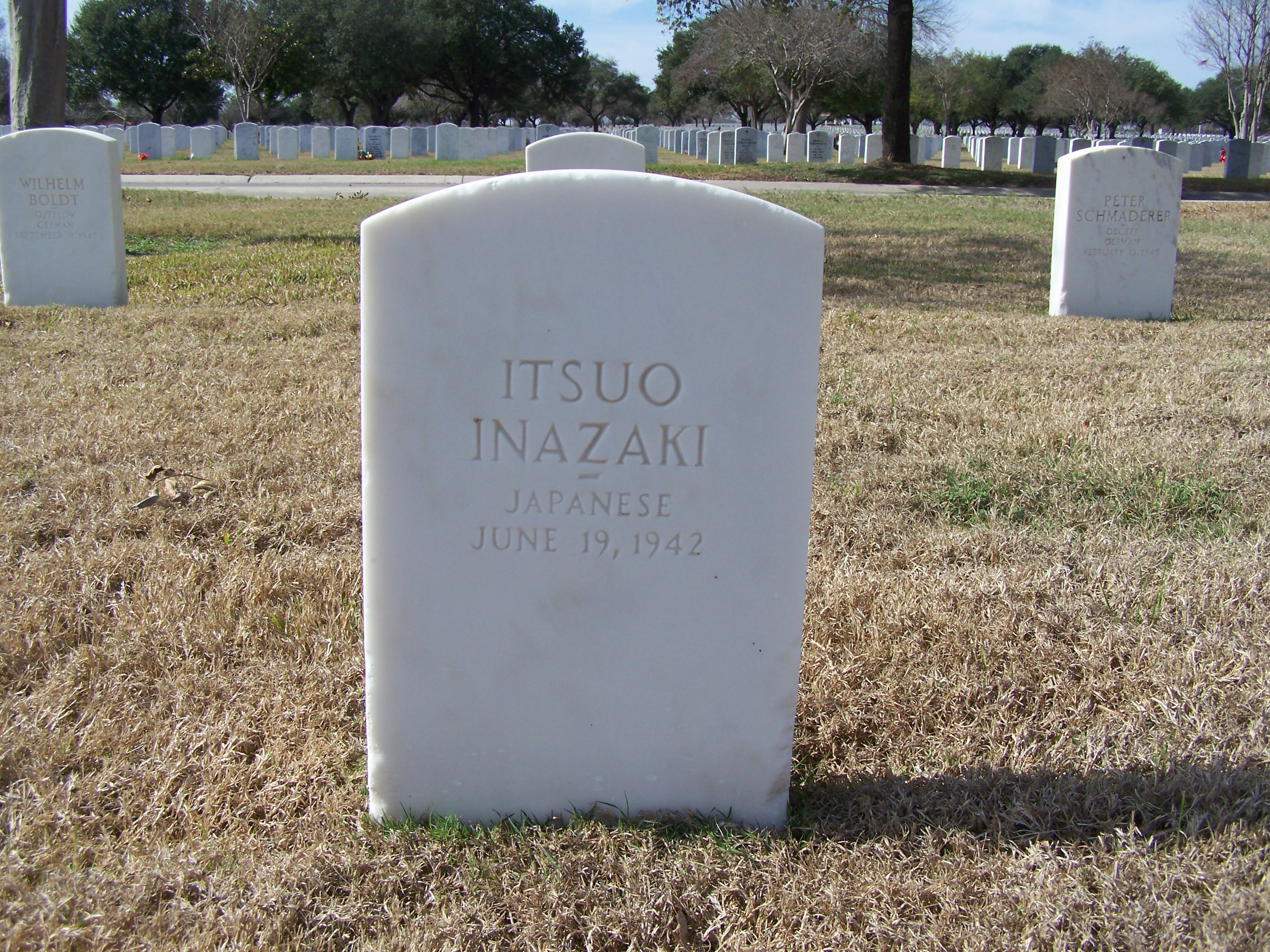
Japanese POW marker

In February 2023, the Department of Veterans Affairs dedicated new headstones at the cemetery for 17 black soldiers who were wrongly blamed and executed for a race riot that occurred in 1917. The military trials were marked by irregularities, a rush to judgment and the failure to appoint an attorney to defend the men.

Most of those executed were initially buried in unmarked graves, then reburied at Fort Sam Houston National Cemetery in 1937 with only their names and dates of death inscribed. Army Secretary Christine Wormuth vacated the soldiers' convictions in 2023 and their records now reflect honorable discharges. New headstones have been provided by the VA.

== Notable interments ==
- Medal of Honor recipients
  - Staff Sergeant Lucian Adams, for action in World War II.
  - Master Sergeant Roy Benavidez, for action in the Vietnam War.
  - Colonel Cecil Hamilton Bolton, for action in World War II.
  - Staff Sergeant William J. Bordelon, for action at the Battle of Tarawa in World War II.
  - Platoon Sergeant William George Harrell, for action at Battle of Iwo Jima in World War II.
  - Second Lieutenant Lloyd Herbert Hughes, for action in Operation Tidal Wave in World War II.
  - Private Milton A. Lee, for action in the Vietnam War.
  - Sergeant First Class Jose M. Lopez, for action in World War II.
  - First Lieutenant James E. Robinson, Jr., for action in World War II.
  - Chief Warrant Officer Louis R. Rocco, for action in the Vietnam War.
  - Master Sergeant Cleto Luna Rodriguez, for action in World War II.
  - Colonel Seth Lathrop Weld, for action in the Philippine–American War.
- Other notable interments
  - Colonel Charlie Beckwith, creator of 1st Special Forces Operational Detachment-Delta (Delta Force).
  - Colonel Doc Blanchard, Heisman Trophy winner for 1945
  - Brigadier General Oscar Bergstrom Abbott, Commanding General of Camp Beale during World War II.
  - Brigadier General Bertram A. Bone, USMC; was a Commanding officer of 1st Defense Battalion during World War II.
  - General Richard E. Cavazos, United States Army's first Hispanic four-star general.
  - Major General Mary E. Clarke, final director of the Women's Army Corps
  - Lt. Colonel Richard E. Cole, Doolitle Raider
  - Brigadier General Lillian Dunlap, former chief of the United States Army Nurse Corps
  - Gustavo "Gus" C. Garcia, Mexican-American civil rights attorney
  - Joseph A. Green, commander of US Army Coast Artillery Corps
  - Robert Gottschall, actor working under the name Robert Shaw, and former United States Army Lieutenant Colonel.
  - Lieutenant General Charles P. Hall, commanded the 93rd Infantry Division and XI Corps in World War II.
  - Lieutenant General John Q. Henion, commanded United States Army Recruiting Command, 9th Infantry Division, and United States Army Japan
  - General Henry I. Hodes, U.S. Army four-star general
  - Major General Harry H. Johnson, commander of the 2nd Cavalry Division and 93rd Infantry Division during World War II.
  - Captain Norman Kleiss, Naval aviator awarded the Navy Cross for his actions in the Battle of Midway.
  - Brigadier General Charles I. Murray, USMC. A recipient of Navy Cross and Army Distinguished Service Cross.
  - Colonel Ralph Parr, WW II, Korean War, and Vietnam War veteran; only person to be awarded Distinguished Service Cross and Air Force Cross; credited with ten aerial kills (double ace) during Korean War, including the last aerial kill of the war - an Il-12.
  - Brigadier General John L. Pierce, World War II commander of 16th Armored Division in European theater.
  - Captain William Millican Randolph, namesake of Randolph Air Force Base.
  - Major General Emil F. Reinhardt, World War II commander of 69th Infantry Division and IX Corps.
  - Joe Sage, member of the Texas House of Representatives from Bexar County from 1973 to 1975
  - José de la Luz Sáenz, wrote the only World War I diary by a Mexican-American soldier
  - Frank Tejeda, US Congressman.
  - Colonel Gerald Evan Williams, Commander of the 391st Bombardment Group, 1943–1945
  - Major General Roscoe B. Woodruff, World War II commander of 77th and 24th Infantry Divisions and VII Corps in both European and Pacific theaters.
  - Colonel Edward J. York, Doolitle Raider
- Other noteworthy interments
  - 27 Buffalo Soldiers who served during the Indian Wars.
  - 140 Axis prisoners of war from World War II.
  - 4 British Royal Air Force officers from World War II.
