= Joe Sage =

American politician

Member of the Texas House of Representatives
- In office 1973–1975
- Succeeded by: Albert Brown

Personal details
- Born: Joseph F. Sage; August 24, 1920
- Died: January 9, 1977 (aged 56)
- Party: Republican
- Spouse(s): Ginny Reber; Virginia K. Sage
- Education: Trinity University; Saint Louis University; Drake University

Joseph F. Sage (August 24, 1920 – January 9, 1977) was an American politician. He served as a Republican member of the Texas House of Representatives.

Sage attended Pottsville High School, Trinity University, Saint Louis University and Drake University. Sage worked as a lawyer. He served in the United States Army Air Force for 30 years, including service in World War II and the Korean War, retiring with the rank of colonel. In 1973 Sage was elected to the Texas House of Representatives, serving until 1975.

Sage died in January 1977, at the age of 56. He was buried in Fort Sam Houston National Cemetery.
