= Richard E. Cole =

United States Air Force officer and participant in the Doolittle Raid

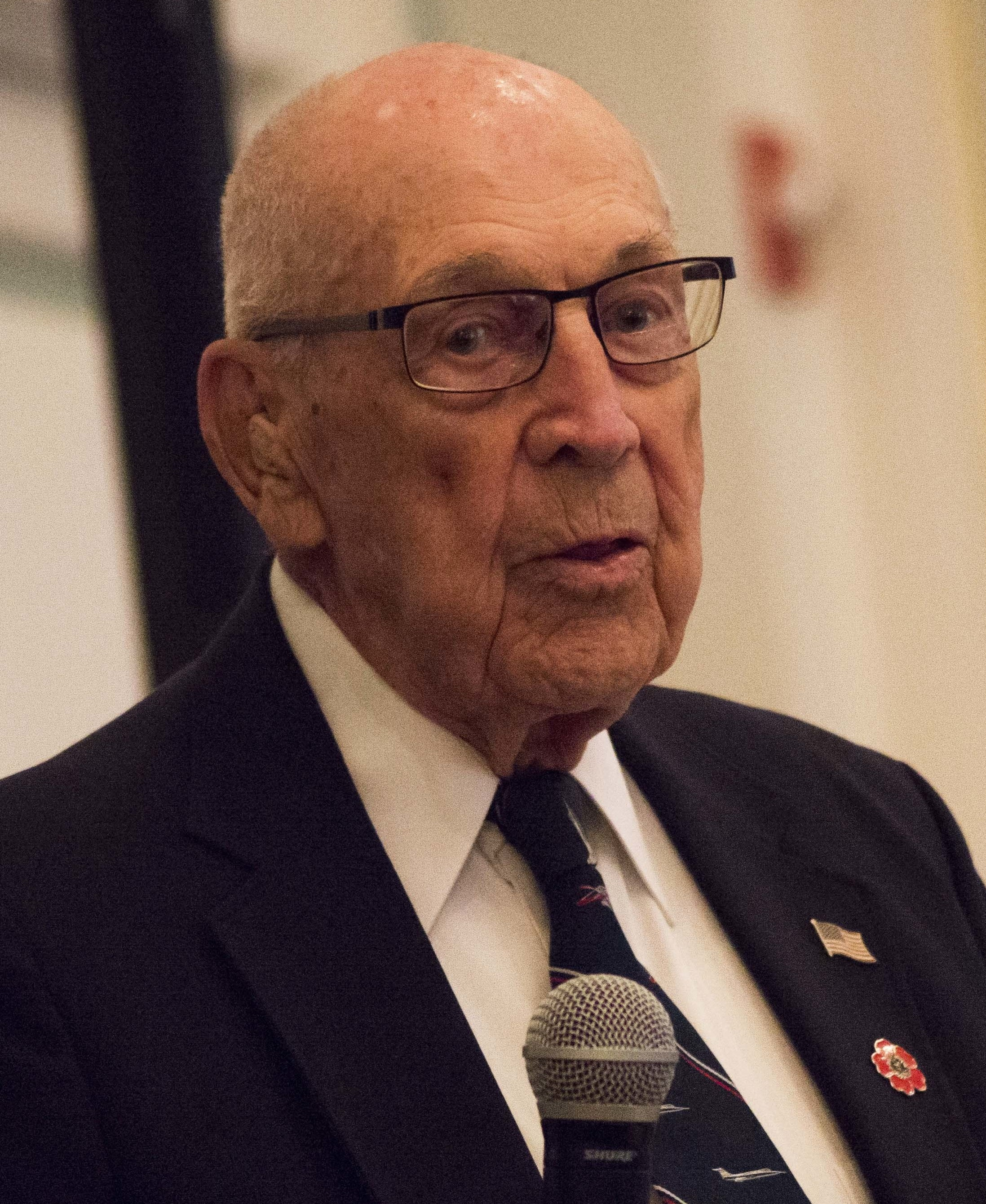
- Cole in 2014
- Born: Richard Eugene Cole; September 7, 1915; Dayton, Ohio, U.S.
- Died: April 9, 2019 (aged 103); San Antonio, Texas, U.S.
- Burial place: Fort Sam Houston National Cemetery
- Military career
- Allegiance: United States
- Branch: United States Army Air Forces; United States Air Force
- Service years: 1940–1966
- Rank: Lieutenant colonel Colonel (Posthumous)
- Nickname: "Dick"
- Units: 17th Bomb Group; 1st Air Commando Group
- Commands: 831st Combat Support Group
- Conflicts: World War II; Korean War
- Awards: Distinguished Flying Cross (3); Bronze Star Medal; Air Medal (2)

Richard Eugene Cole (September 7, 1915 – April 9, 2019) was a United States Air Force colonel. During World War II, he was one of the airmen who took part in the Doolittle Raid on Tokyo, Japan, on April 18, 1942. He served as the co-pilot to Lieutenant Colonel Jimmy Doolittle in the lead airplane of the raid by sixteen B-25 bombers, which for the first time took off from an aircraft carrier on a bombing mission.

Cole remained in China after the raid until June 1943, and served again in the China Burma India Theater from October 1943 until June 1944. He later served as operations advisor to the Venezuelan Air Force from 1959 to 1962. He retired from the Air Force in 1966 and became the last living Doolittle Raider in 2016.

== Early life ==
Richard "Dick" Cole was born on September 7, 1915, in Dayton, Ohio. He was graduated from Steele High School and went on to attend Ohio University for two years.

== Military career ==
=== Doolittle Raid ===
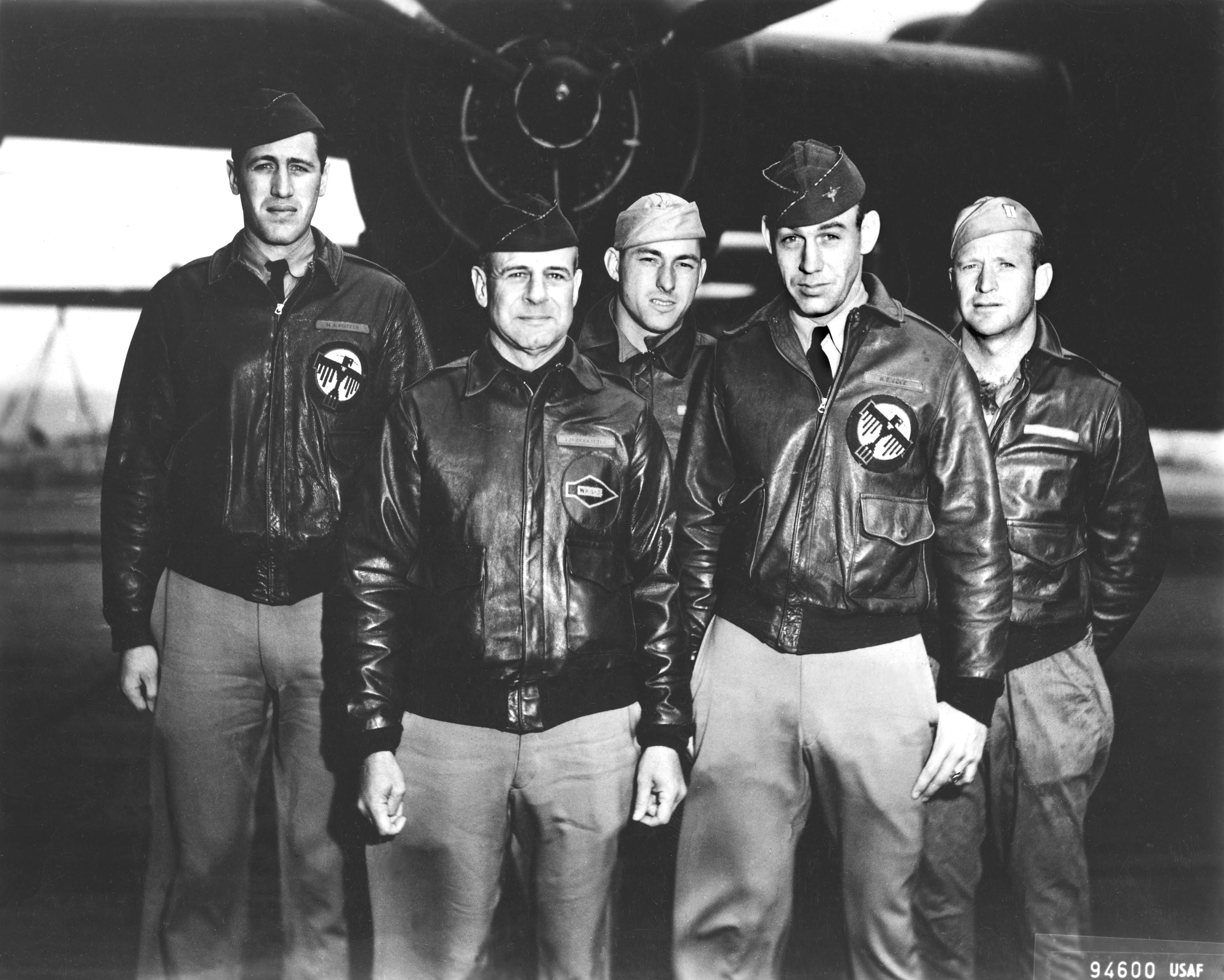
Doolittle Tokyo Raiders, Crew No. 1, 34th Bombardment Squadron. From left to right: Lt. Henry A. Potter, navigator; Lt. Col. James H. Doolittle, pilot; SSgt. Fred A. Braemer, bombardier; Lt. Richard E. Cole, copilot; SSgt. Paul J. Leonard, flight engineer/gunner. On the deck of USS Hornet, April 18, 1942

Cole enlisted as an aviation cadet in the United States Army Air Forces on November 22, 1940, at Lubbock, Texas.

He was commissioned as a second lieutenant in July 1941 and rated as a pilot, when he was awarded his pilot wings at Randolph Field, Texas, on July 12, 1941. His first assignment was as a B-25 Mitchell pilot with the 34th Bomb Squadron of the 17th Bomb Group at Pendleton, Oregon, in July 1941.

Cole was assigned as the co-pilot of the first B-25 Mitchell medium bomber (Aircraft Number One), plane # 40–2344, for the famous "Doolittle Raid" in the wake of the attack on Pearl Harbor after two other pilots became ill. The raid was daring not only because of the intended targets, the Japanese homeland and its capital Tokyo, but because the pilots trained to take off in a B-25 bomber from the deck of an aircraft carrier, something the designers of neither the B-25 nor the aircraft carrier ever envisioned. Cole was co-pilot in the first bomber to depart the deck of the USS Hornet during the mission, and it was piloted by the leader of the raid, then-Lieutenant Colonel Jimmy Doolittle, giving him, and the plane, the very least amount of runway available to the planes in the raid.

On April 18, 1942, Doolittle and his B-25's four crew members took off from the Hornet, reached Tokyo, bombed their target, and then headed for their recovery airfield in China. Doolittle and his crew bailed out safely over China when their B-25 ran out of fuel after flying 2,500 miles (4,000 km). By then, they had been flying for about 13 hours, it was nighttime, the weather was stormy, and Doolittle was unable to locate their landing field in Quzhou. He and his crew linked up after the bailout and were helped through Japanese lines by Chinese guerrillas and American missionary John Birch.

=== Post raid ===
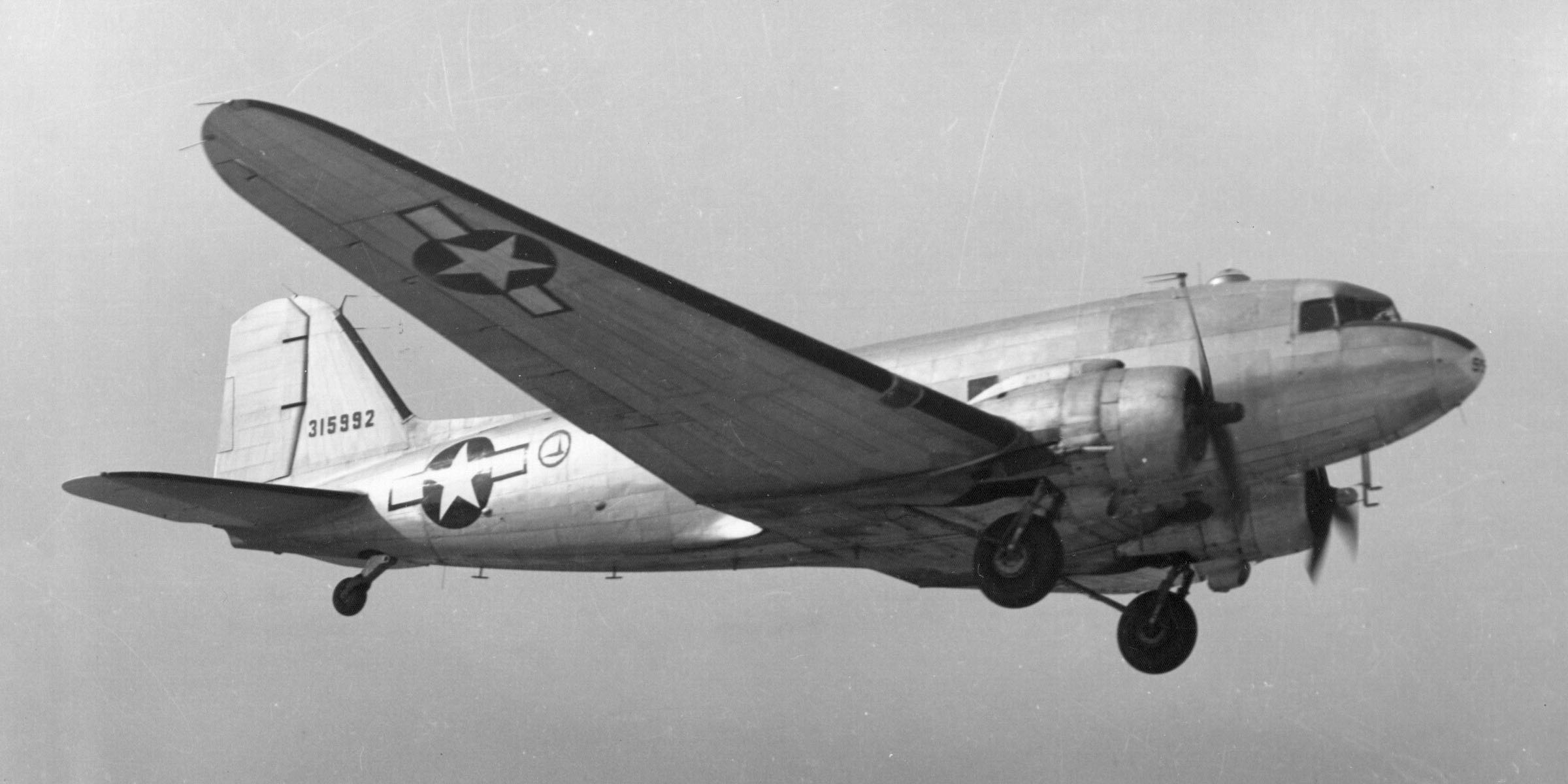
C-47 Skytrain

After the raid, Cole remained in China and flew C-47 Skytrains to transport supplies from Burma to China over the dangerous Himalayan mountains known as The Hump, from May 1942 to June 1943. He later served with the 5th Fighter Group in Tulsa, Oklahoma, from June to October 1943.

Cole then volunteered for Project 9, which was the birth of the Air Commandos. He served as an original Air Commando in the Transport Section of Project 9 in the China Burma India (CBD) Theater. They took part in the Invasion of Burma, where they invaded with gliders, built a couple of airfields behind Japanese lines, which was the beginning of the march from northeastern India by the ground forces to retake Burma. Cole served with the Air Commandos from October 1943 until he returned to the United States in June 1944.

His next assignment was as an Army Air Forces plant representative and acceptance test pilot at Wichita, Kansas, from June 1944 to October 1945, and then as officer in charge of the training section at Victorville Army Air Field, California, from October 1945 to November 1946. Cole went on terminal leave beginning November 13, 1946, and left active duty on January 11, 1947.

=== Post war ===
Cole returned to active duty on July 7, 1947, and served on the group staff at Wright-Patterson Air Force Base, Ohio, from July 1947 to January 1952, followed by attending the Armed Forces Staff College at Norfolk, Virginia, from January to September 1952.

During the Korean War, Cole next served on the staff of Far Eastern Air Forces in Japan from September 1952 to March 1955, and then on the staff of Headquarters U.S. Air Force in the Pentagon from March 1955 to July 1958.

After attending Spanish language training, he served as an advisor to the Venezuelan Air Force in Caracas, Venezuela, from January 1959 to August 1962, followed by service with the 464th Troop Carrier Wing at Pope Air Force Base, North Carolina, from August to October 1962. His next assignment was on the staff of the Joint Development Group at Fort Bragg, North Carolina, from October 1962 to February 1963, and then as director of operations, executive officer, and as vice commander of the 831st Combat Support Group at George Air Force Base, California, in February 1963.

Cole retired from the military in 1966.

== Post-retirement ==
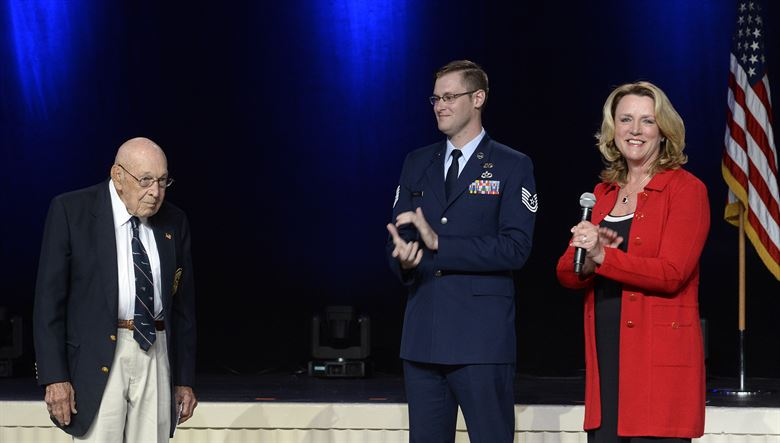
Dick Cole announces the name of the B-21 with Air Force Secretary Deborah Lee James (right), during the Air Force Association conference on September 19, 2016.

On May 23, 2014, Cole was present in the White House when President of the United States Barack Obama signed a bill awarding the Congressional Gold Medal to the Doolittle Raiders. On April 15, 2015, President Obama presented the Congressional Gold Medal to Cole and three other surviving members of the raid, in a ceremony at the White House.

Cole was the last surviving participant in the Doolittle Raid. Staff Sergeant David J. Thatcher, gunner of aircraft No. 7, died on June 23, 2016, at the age of 94. Cole, who lived to be 103, was the only participant to live to a higher age than the raid's leader, Jimmy Doolittle, who died in 1993 at age 96.

On September 19, 2016, the Northrop Grumman B-21 was formally named "Raider" in honor of the Doolittle Raiders. As the last surviving Raider, Cole was present at the naming ceremony during the Air Force Association conference.

== Death and burial ==
Cole died in San Antonio, Texas, on April 9, 2019, at the age of 103. A memorial service for Cole was held at Joint Base San Antonio on April 18, the 77th anniversary of the Doolittle Raid.

Cole was scheduled to be buried with full military honors at Arlington National Cemetery. Originally planned for August 2019, his burial was postponed to April 18, 2020, the 78th anniversary of the Doolittle Raid, but that was delayed by the COVID-19 pandemic. His family finally decided to have Cole buried along with his wife at Fort Sam Houston National Cemetery in San Antonio on September 7, 2021, his 106th birthday.

Cole was posthumously promoted to Colonel at the ceremony at Joint Base San Antonio in September 2021.

== Family ==
Cole was married for 59 years to Lucia Martha "Marty" (Harrell) Cole, who died in 2003 at the age of 79. They had five children and numerous grandchildren.

== Military awards ==
Cole received the following decorations and awards:

US Air Force Command Pilot Badge
Distinguished Flying Cross with two bronze oak leaf clusters
Bronze Star	Air Medal with bronze oak leaf cluster	Air Force Commendation Medal
Air Force Presidential Unit Citation	Air Force Outstanding Unit Award	American Defense Service Medal
American Campaign Medal	Asiatic-Pacific Campaign Medal with four bronze campaign stars	World War II Victory Medal
National Defense Service Medal with bronze service star	Korean Service Medal	Air Force Longevity Service Award with silver oak leaf cluster
Republic of China Medal of the Armed Forces; A-1	United Nations Korea Medal	Republic of China War Memorial Medal
