= Edward J. York =

United States Air Force colonel (1912–1984)

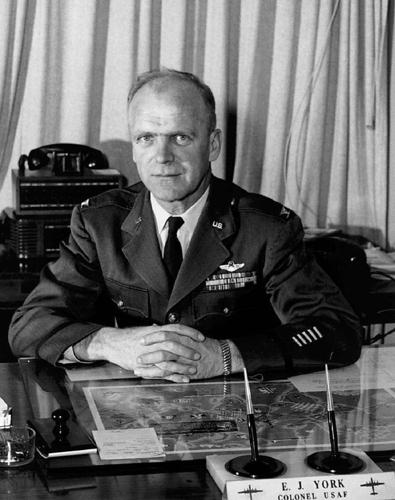
- York as a colonel in the United States Air Force
- Born: Edward Joseph Cichowski; August 16, 1912; Batavia, New York, U.S.
- Died: August 31, 1984 (aged 72); San Antonio, Texas, U.S.
- Burial place: Fort Sam Houston National Cemetery
- Military career
- Branch: United States Army; United States Army Air Corps; United States Army Air Forces; United States Air Force
- Service years: 1930–1966
- Rank: Colonel
- Nicknames: "Eddie", "Ed", "Ski"
- Units: 95th Bombardment Squadron, 17th Bombardment Group; 483rd Bombardment Group
- Commands: 95th Bombardment Squadron; Air Force Officer Training School; ICBM Site Activation Task Force, Larson Air Force Base
- Conflicts: World War II
- Awards: Legion of Merit; Distinguished Flying Cross; Bronze Star Medal; Air Medal (3)

Edward Joseph York (August 16, 1912 – August 31, 1984) was a United States Air Force colonel. A graduate of the United States Military Academy, he was one of the airmen who took part in the Doolittle Raid on Tokyo, Japan, during World War II, on April 18, 1942. After bombing Japan during the raid and due to mechanical trouble with his bomber, he was forced to land in the Soviet Union, where he was interned with his crew for 14 months before escaping back to the United States. He retired from military service in 1966.

== Early life ==
York was born Edward Joseph Cichowski on August 16, 1912, in Batavia, New York, to Ignatius, an immigrant from Poland, and Tekla Cichowski. He completed grammar and high school in Batavia, before enlisting in the United States Army in 1930.

== Military career ==
Following his enlistment in the United States Army in 1930, he was assigned to the 7th Infantry Division and was stationed at several posts including at Chillkoot Barracks in Alaska. Aspiring to become an officer in the army, he attended United States Military Academy Preparatory School in San Francisco for 18 months before receiving a senatorial appointment to attend the United States Military Academy in West Point, New York. He graduated third in his class in West Point on June 14, 1938.

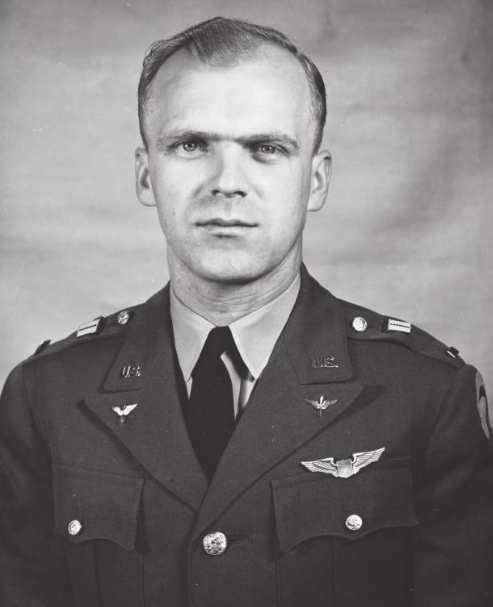
York as a captain in the United States Army Air Forces

Following graduation, he was commissioned as second lieutenant in the United States Army Air Corps and was assigned to Randolph Field in Texas for pilot training. He graduated and earned his pilot wings in May 1939. After earning his pilot wings, he was assigned to the 95th Bombardment Squadron at March Field in California where he flew Northrop A-17s and Douglas B-18 Bolos. In August 1939, the squadron moved to McChord Field in Pendleton, Oregon, where they were equipped with Douglas B-23 Dragons and North American B-25 Mitchells, and York appointed as the squadron's commander. In the immediate aftermath of the Japanese attack on Pearl Harbor on December 7, 1941, the 95th flew anti-submarine warfare patrols in the Pacific Northwest from December 22, 1941, to March 1942, before being assigned to Lexington County Airport, South Carolina, on February 9, 1942, in order to meet the greater threat from German submarines operating off the East Coast. During this time, he legally changed his surname to York from Cichowski, while retaining '-ski' of his old surname as his nickname.

=== World War II ===
==== Doolittle Raid and subsequent internment in the Soviet Union ====
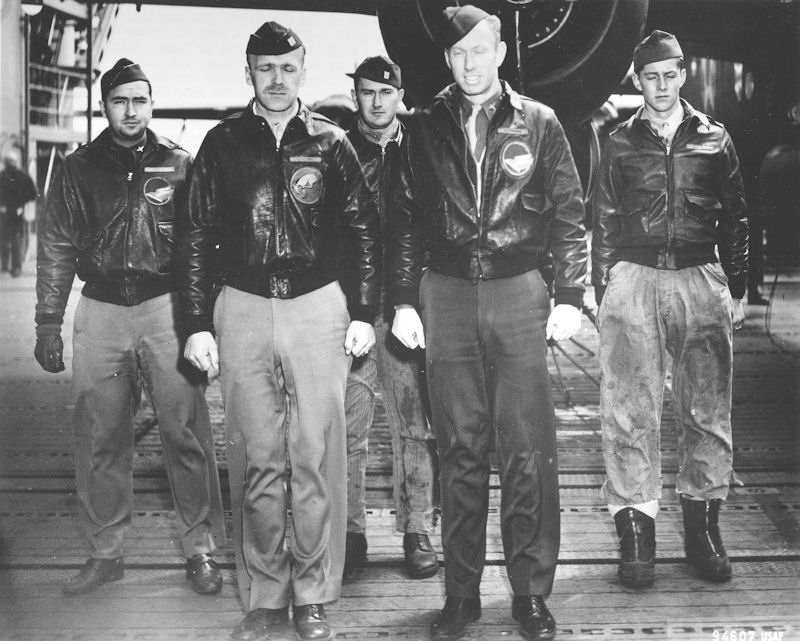
Crew No. 8 in front of B-25#40-2242, on the deck of Hornet, April 18, 1942. From left to right: (front row) Capt. Edward J. York, pilot; Lt. Robert G. Emmens, copilot; (back row) Lt. Nolan A. Herndon, navigator/bombardier; SSgt. Theodore H. Laban, flight engineer; Sgt. David W. Pohl, gunner.

In March 1942, York, now a captain, was designated as the operations officer for the Doolittle Raid, the first American air operation to strike the Japanese Home Islands and led by Lt. Col. Jimmy Doolittle. This also made York the only West Point graduate to participate in the raid. Prior to the loading of B-25s on board USS Hornet (CV-8) for the raid, the carburetors of the B-25s had been carefully adjusted and bench-marked at Eglin Field for maximum fuel efficiency in low level flight for the raid. Without Doolittle's knowledge and in violation of his orders, both carburetors on York's B-25 had been replaced by depot workers in Sacramento. The change was not discovered until the raiders were at sea, resulting in engine problems for York's B-25. Departing earlier than planned due to concerns about Japanese detection on April 18, 1942, York's B-25, specifically aircraft No. 40–2242, was the eighth aircraft to be launched from the Hornet. Despite the high fuel consumption of both engines, York continued to drop his bombs on targets in Tokyo.

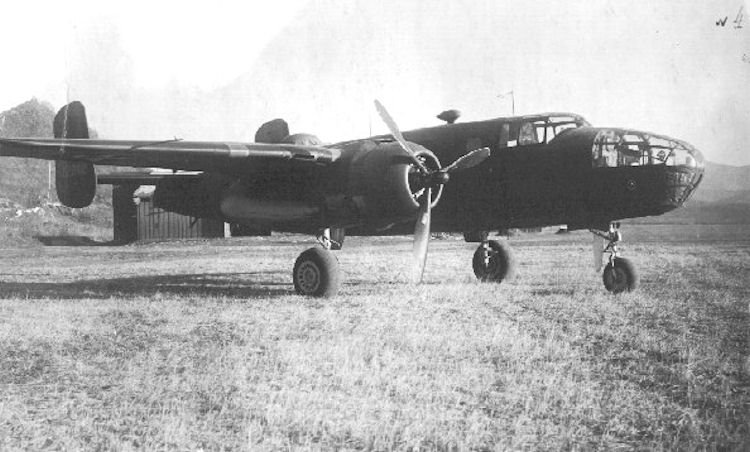
York's B-25 after landing in the Soviet Union following the raid (1942)

After bombing Japan, the raiders continued westward to land in China. As York's B-25 was excessively consuming its fuel despite switching from the depleted auxiliary fuel tanks to the main tanks, he was aware he would not make it to China, hence decided to make an emergency landing at Vozdvizhenka Air Base near the port city of Vladivostok in Soviet Union. The remainder of the 15 bombers of the raid reached China and crashed after they ran out of fuel, while the B-25 piloted by York was the only raid-participating bomber to land intact. Upon landing in the Soviet Union, the base commander of Vozdvizhenka asked York if he was a participant of the Tokyo Raid. After affirming that he was, York asked the base commander if he could provide gasoline to the B-25 so that he could continue flying towards China. The base commander agreed but later refused after intervention from the Soviet chain of command. The Soviet Foreign Ministry issued a formal protest to the American ambassador to the Soviet Union William Standley and publicly announced that York and his four bomber crew members would be interned in the Soviet Union. Given that the Soviet Union and Japan were not at war and that the Soviet–Japanese Neutrality Pact was formally in effect, the Soviet Union was not legally permitted to promptly return any Allied personnel who had entered its territory during hostilities. Moreover, Japanese forces could have taken military action in the Soviet Far East at that time. As a result, the B-25 was impounded and the crew members were detained in spite of formal US pleas for their release. The bomber crew were moved to a village 300 miles (480 km) southeast of Moscow.

York later stated that he and his crew were treated properly by Soviet authorities. Several months later, they were relocated to Ashgabat (Ashkhabad), in what was then the Turkmen Soviet Socialist Republic, 20 miles (32 km) from the Soviet-Iran border. In mid-1943, they were allowed to cross the border into Allied-occupied Iran. On May 11, 1943, York and his four crew members presented themselves at a British consulate in Mashhad, Iran. With the help of British diplomats, the crew members were able to travel back to the United States. A cover story was created claiming that York had bribed a smuggler to help them escape Soviet captivity. Declassified Soviet records eventually showed that the "smuggling" was orchestrated by the NKVD. During his internment, York managed to become fluent in the Russian language.

York's B-25 in the Soviet Union was reportedly scrapped during the 1950s.

=== Post-internment ===
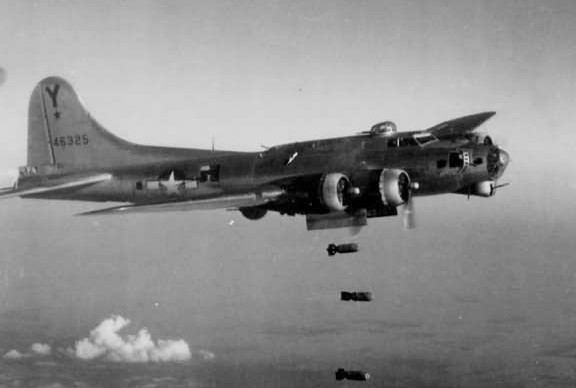
483rd BG B-17 (1944)

Following his return to the United States in late June 1943, York trained in B-25, Boeing B-17 Flying Fortress and Consolidated B-24 Liberators in preparation for his further combat service during World War II. In March 1944, he was assigned to the 483rd Bombardment Group in Italy where he flew 24 combat missions over Southern Europe in B-17s until August 1944 when he was ordered to return to the United States due to military policy prohibiting former internees from continuing to take part in combat operations.

=== Post-war ===
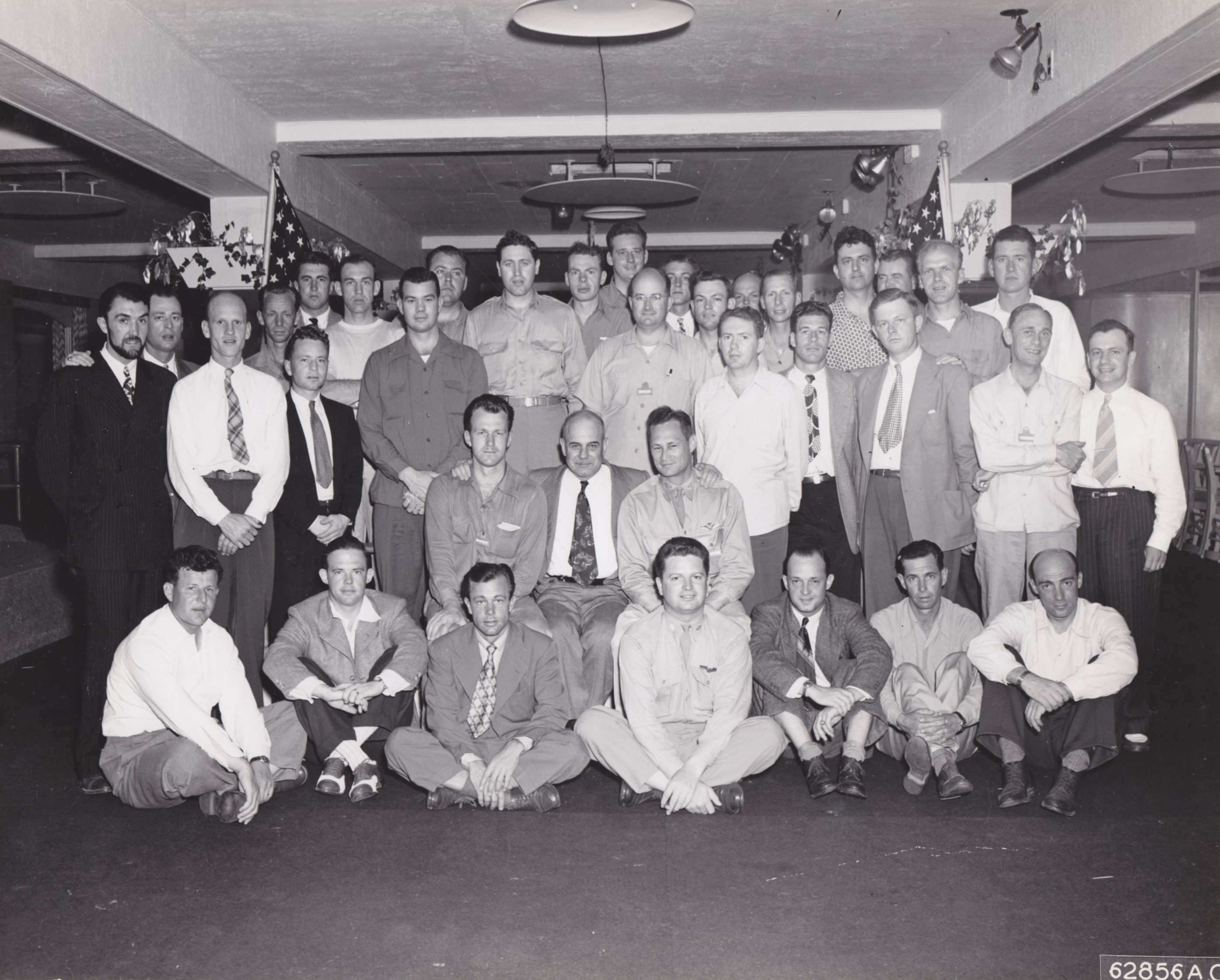
York (top row, second from right) at a reunion of the participants of the Doolittle Raid in Miami Beach, Florida (1947)

Following his return from combat service in Europe in August 1944, he was assigned to Randolph Field as an air inspector from August 1944 to June 1945. Following the end of war in Europe in May 1945, York was assigned as an air attaché in Warsaw, Poland, from July 1945 to January 1947. During this time, he became a certified Polish language instructor. Following his return from Poland in January 1947, he was appointed as commandant of the Air Force Officer Training School in San Antonio, Texas, from March 1947 to April 1948. From 1948 to 1951, York was stationed in Copenhagen where he served as an air attaché to Denmark and chief of the Air Force section for the Military Assistance Advisory Group. Following his return from Denmark, he was a student at the Air War College in Maxwell Air Force Base and graduated in 1952, and then assigned as chief of the Air Attaché Branch at the headquarters of the United States Air Force in the Pentagon till June 1955.

Between June 1955 and August 1958, York held the role of Deputy Chief of Staff for Plans at the headquarters of the Military Air Transport Service at Andrews Air Force Base in Maryland. Afterward, he became the Chief of Staff for the Western Transport Air Force at Travis Air Force Base in California, serving there until August 1960. He then took command of an ICBM Site Activation Task Force at Larson Air Force Base in Washington, from August 1960 to November 1962. Following that, he became Chief of Staff at the headquarters of the United States Air Force Security Service headquarters at Kelly Air Force Base in Texas, serving from November 1962 to June 1966. His final position before retirement from the Air Force on September 2, 1966, at the rank of colonel, was as Deputy Commander of the United States Air Force Security Service.

== Later life ==
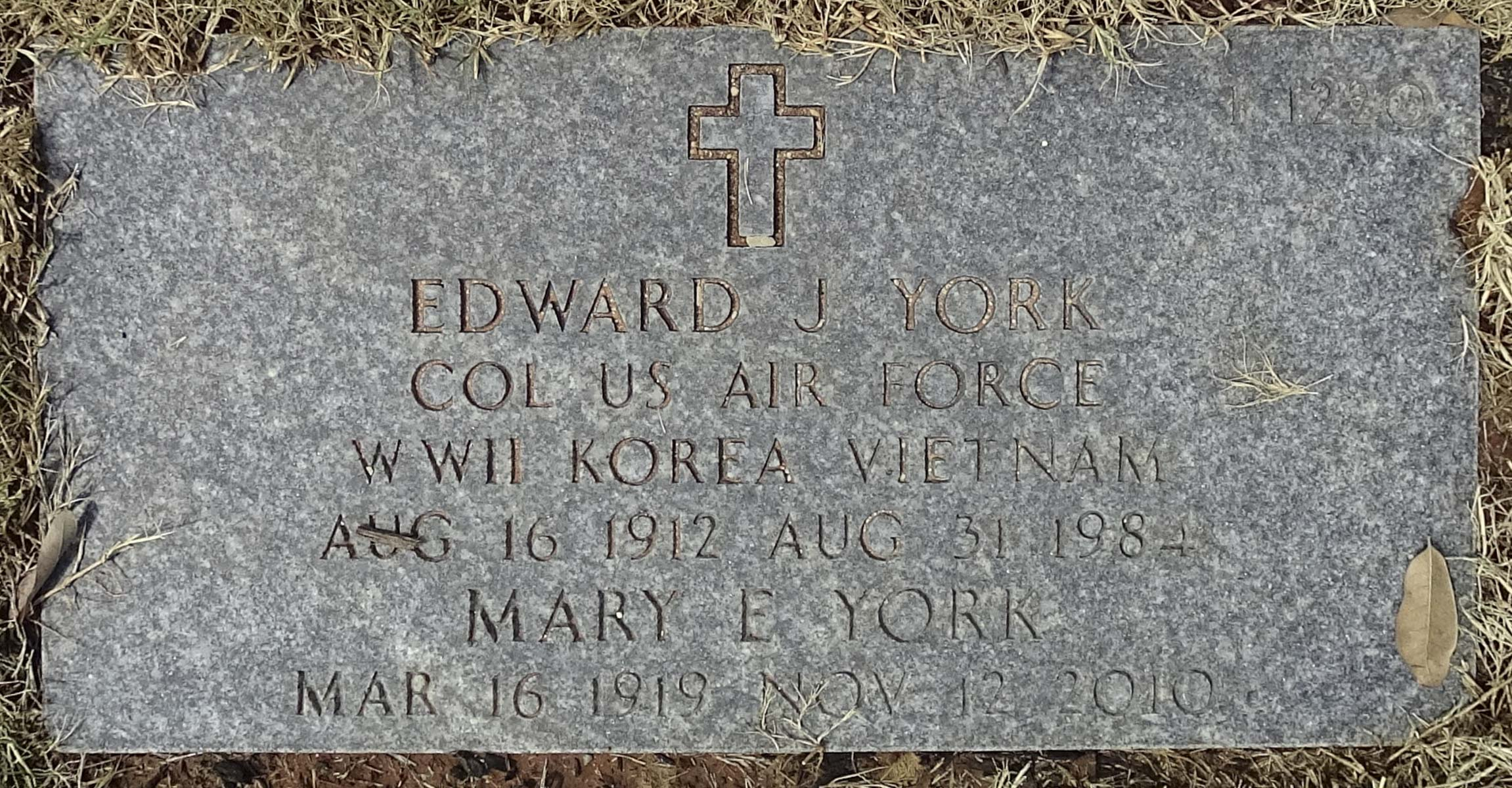
Grave of York and his wife at Fort Sam Houston National Cemetery in San Antonio, Texas

York and his wife Mary Elizabeth had a son and daughter. York's son is a 1970 graduate of the United States Air Force Academy in Colorado Springs, Colorado.

Following his retirement from the military, York continued with his study of Russian language at the University of Texas at Austin. Following this, he worked as a city manager of Olmos Park in San Antonio. Prior to his death, York was interviewed in 1984 about his involvement in the Doolittle Raid and subsequent internment in the Soviet Union. York died of a heart attack at his home in San Antonio on August 31, 1984, at the age of 72. He was buried at Fort Sam Houston National Cemetery.

Following his death, Jimmy Doolittle stated about York:

Ski and I served together, I am proud to say, during the raid over Tokyo. He was the only West Pointer in the group and, as operations officer, added his knowledge and expertise to the mission. We were all grateful for his attention to detail and thorough follow-through. Not only was Edward a fine officer but an excellent individual. We miss him, but remember his terrific spirit.

== Awards and decorations ==
York's awards include:

Command pilot badge
Legion of Merit
Distinguished Flying Cross
Bronze Star Medal
Air Medal with two bronze oak leaf clusters
Air Force Commendation Medal
Prisoner of War Medal (Note: In 1985 this award was made retroactive to all U.S. military personnel who were prisoners of war.)
American Defense Service Medal
American Campaign Medal
Asiatic-Pacific Campaign Medal with bronze campaign star
European-African-Middle Eastern Campaign Medal with two bronze campaign stars
World War II Victory Medal
National Defense Service Medal with service star
Air Force Longevity Service Award with silver and bronze oak leaf clusters
Order of the Cloud and Banner, 4th Class (Republic of China)
War Memorial Medal (Republic of China)

== Bibliography ==
- Glines, Carroll V. (1988). The Doolittle Raid: America's Daring First Strike Against Japan. New York: Orion Books. ISBN 0517567482. OCLC 17548701. OL 2526629M.
