= Oscar Bergstrom Abbott =

American general

- Born: October 8, 1890; San Antonio, Texas, US
- Died: October 1, 1969 (aged 78)
- Burial place: Fort Sam Houston National Cemetery
- Education: A&M College of Texas
- Military career
- Allegiance: United States of America
- Branch: United States Army; Texas Army National Guard
- Service years: 1916−1950
- Rank: Brigadier General
- Nickname: "Daddy Ock"
- Service number: 0-5748
- Wars: World War I World War II
- Awards: Legion of Merit

Oscar Bergstrom Abbott (October 8, 1890 – October 1, 1969) was an American brigadier general during World War II.

== Early life and education ==
Abbott was born on October 8, 1890, in San Antonio, Texas. He attended the Agricultural and Mechanical College of Texas, now Texas A&M University.

== Military service ==
Abbott enlisted in the Texas National Guard in May 1916. He served as a cavalry supply sergeant in the guard until June 1917, when he commissioned as a cavalry officer.

Abbott moved from the cavalry to the infantry in August 1917. He graduated from the Infantry Officer Advanced Course in 1929 and the Command and General Staff School in 1931. He then served as staff at the Army War College from 1931 to 1933. He returned to the Texas National Guard in July 1937, where he would serve as an instructor until August 1940.

After that, he became a staff officer, serving in the War Department General Staff as the Chief of the Miscellaneous Branch from August 1940 to June 1942. From June 1942 to May 1944, he served in the headquarters of the US Army Services of Supply. During this assignment, he was promoted to brigadier general in April 1943. Abbott served as the commanding general of Camp Beale from May 1944 to February 1946. He was reverted to the rank of colonel in 1946. He served as the executive officer of the Texas Military District in 1949.

Abbott retired from active service in October 1950.

== Awards ==
Abbott received the Legion of Merit.

== Death ==
Abbott died on October 1, 1969. He is buried in Fort Sam Houston National Cemetery.
