= Medford IOOF Cemetery =

Historic cemetery in Jackson County, Oregon, US

- U.S. National Register of Historic Places
- U.S. Historic district
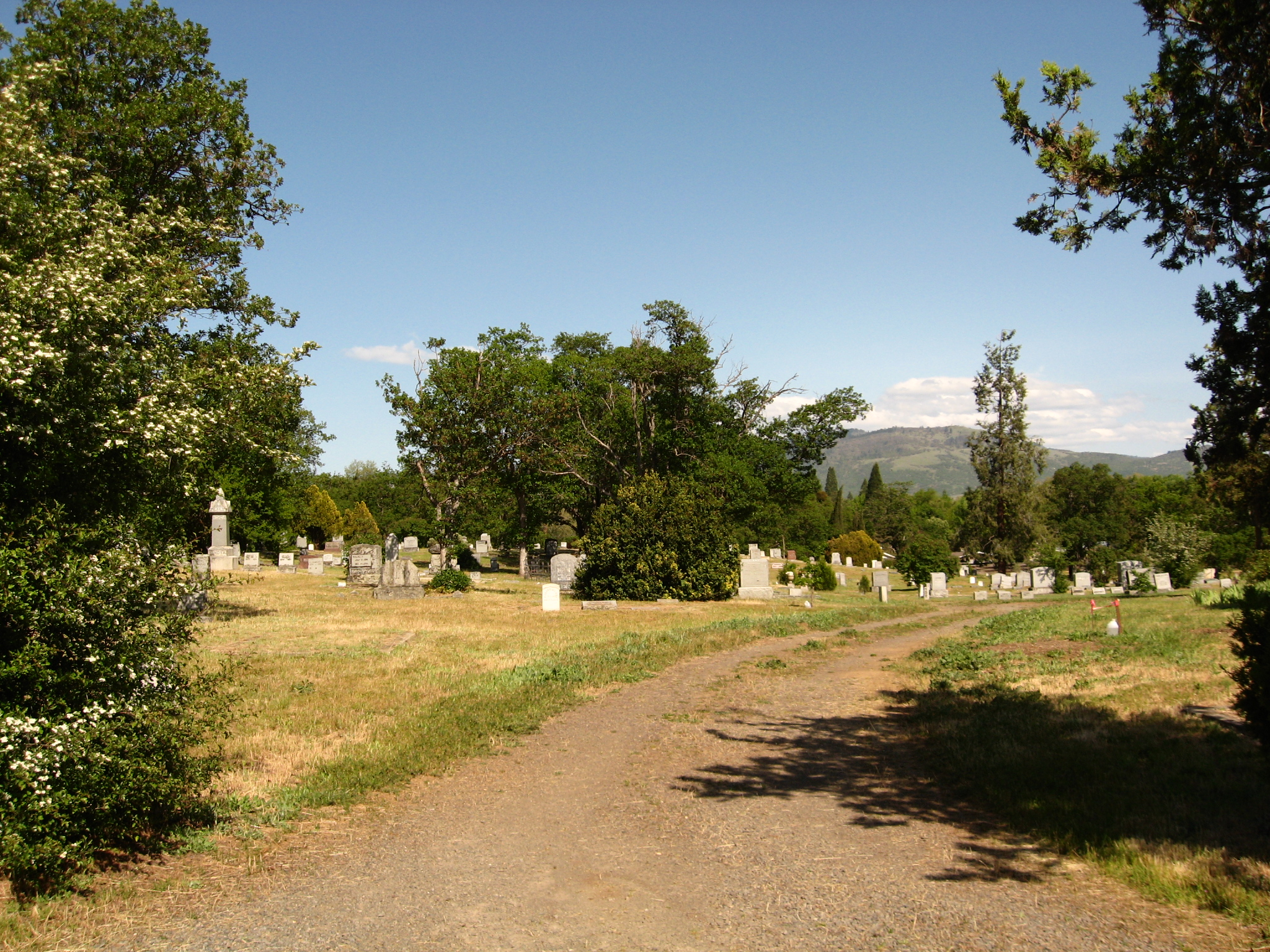

- Location within Oregon Location within the United States
- Location: Siskiyou Blvd. at Highland Dr., Medford, Oregon
- Coordinates: 42°19′23″N 122°51′09″W
- Area: 19.4 acres (7.9 ha)
- Built: 1890
- Built by: Mason, George (1925 mausoleum); Tru-Mix Construction Co. (mausoleum expansion)
- Architectural style: Late 19th and 20th Century Revivals, Art Deco, Modernistic
- NRHP reference No.: 89000205
- Added to NRHP: March 16, 1989

The Medford IOOF Cemetery in Medford, Oregon, also known as Medford Odd Fellows Cemetery and as Eastwood–IOOF Cemetery, was founded in 1890. The cemetery was managed by the IOOF Lodge until 1969 where maintenance was transferred to the City of Medford, where it remains today.

The cemetery was added to the National Register of Historic Places in 1989, for its architecture, which includes Late 19th and 20th Century Revivals architecture, Art Deco architecture, and Modernistic architecture. The 19.4-acre (7.9 ha) site includes a contributing building, a contributing site, and a contributing structure.

Its NRHP nomination asserts that "the cemetery's collection of grave markers effectively represents 19th century mortuary art."

The cemetery includes a mausoleum built in 1925 and expanded in 1947. It is 100 by 60 feet (30 m × 18 m) in plan, built of reinforced concrete, and includes a chapel with a stained glass window attributed to the Povey Brothers which presents Christ newly risen with Mary Magdalene. The 1947 expansion covered the front facade, eliminating a columned portico and preserving the stained glass window. The original bronze doors were reinstalled into the new facade. US Representative Edwin Durno (1899–1976) is interred there.
