= William Millican Randolph =

William Millican Randolph (September 19, 1893 – February 17, 1928) was a U. S. Army aviator from 1919 to 1928, until he was killed in an air crash. Randolph Field, Texas, was named in his honor.

== Biography ==
William M. Randolph was born in Austin, Texas. He attended the Agricultural and Mechanical College of Texas prior to enlisting in the U. S. Army in 1916. He completed pilot training at Kelly Field, Texas, in 1919, too late for World War I.

He served in 1928, as adjutant of the Air Corps Flying School at Kelly Field, on an Army Air Corps committee that was seeking a location for a new aviation training field in Texas.

=== Wrecks a Fokker ===
The Associated Press carried this wire report on 19 April 1920: "MODESTO, April 19. - Lieutenant W. M. Randolph of Rockwell Field, driving his German Fokker plane W-7 [probably a Fokker D.VII] from Rockwell Field to the aeronautical show at San Francisco, wrecked the plane here this afternoon when he attempted to make a landing at the edge of the aviation field. The under part of the machine was completely torn away, but the pilot escaped without injury. His engine was stopped when he attempted to alight, and when the wheels struck a ditch he was unable to get the engine started in time to take the air again, and the Fokker, making a leap of about 50 feet, turned turtle and was put out of commission. The dismantled machine will be shipped to San Francisco."

=== Death ===
On 17 February 1928, Capt. Randolph was killed in the crash of a Curtiss AT-4 Hawk, 27–220, three miles NW of Gorman, Texas, after takeoff from Gorman Field. In September 1929, the Army Air Corps named its field north of San Antonio, Texas, Randolph Field for the Austin, Texas, native. Randolph was interred at Fort Sam Houston, Texas.

The Air Corps News Letter published this report on 31 March 1928:

DEATH OF CAPTAIN WILLIAM M. RANDOLPH

Friends of Captain William M. Randolph will be grieved to learn of his death recently in an airplane crash. Captain Randolph flew to Gorman, Texas, in an AT-4 on February 15th. Late on the 17th he took off for the return trip, and in turning downwind the ship fell off and dived into the ground. He died on the way to a local hospital.

Captain Randolph reported to Kelly Field on July 11, 1927, and was appointed Adjutant the month following. He had been an active pilot up until the time of his death, going on numerous cross-country trips as well as performing a great amount of miscellaneous flying.

== Randolph's sons ==
Both of Randolph's sons also died piloting aircraft. William Read Randolph was killed in March 1941 in Texas when his private plane hit a guy wire above a highway. Lt. Benjamin D. Randolph was killed June 3, 1944, on a bombing mission over France. He was posthumously awarded the Air Medal and Oak Leaf Cluster.
