= Suppression of enemy air defenses =

Military tactic

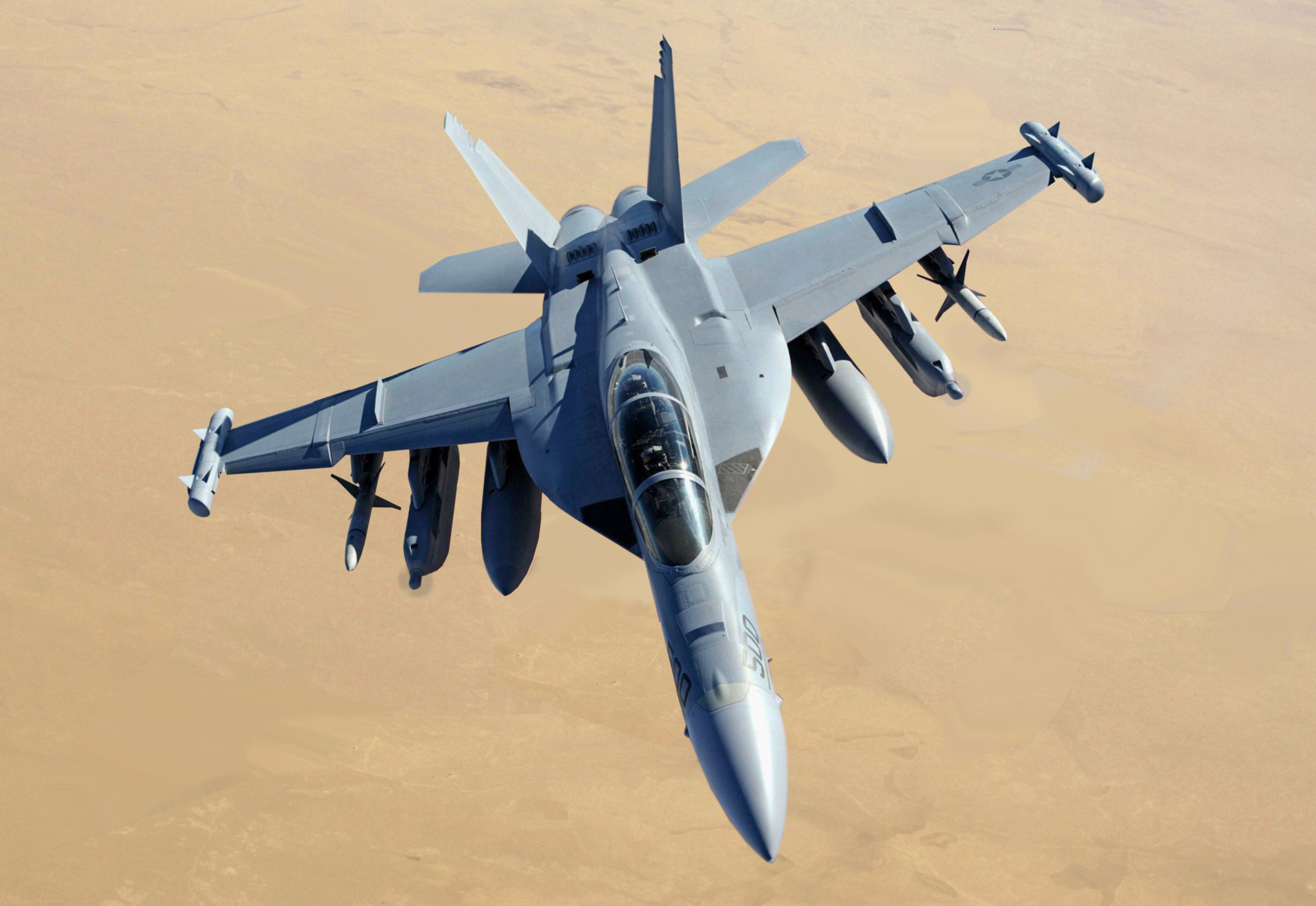
A US Navy EA-18G Growler, loaded with AGM-88 HARM anti-radiation missiles

Suppression of enemy air defenses (SEAD /ˈsiː-æd/), also known in the United States as "Wild Weasel" and (initially) "Iron Hand" operations, are military actions to suppress enemy surface-based air defenses, including surface-to-air missiles (SAMs), anti-aircraft artillery (AAA), and related systems such as early-warning radar and command, control and communication functions.

Suppression can be accomplished by physically destroying the systems or by disrupting and deceiving them through electronic warfare. In modern warfare, SEAD missions can constitute up to 30% of sorties launched in the first week of combat and continue at a reduced rate through the rest of a campaign. One-quarter of American combat sorties in recent conflicts have been SEAD missions. They are generally associated with aircraft, but may be performed using any means, including ground forces.

In some contexts, destruction of enemy air defenses (DEAD) refers to physical destruction of air defense targets, while SEAD applies to sorties which discourage enemy use of air-defense radar assets out of fear of placing the assets in jeopardy.

Primitive operations akin to SEAD emerged during the Second World War: efforts to degrade enemy ground radar stations. The Vietnam War saw the first SEAD missions performed by dedicated aircraft. Other early conflicts with SEAD efforts included the 1982 Falklands War, over Port Stanley, and the 1982 Lebanon War, in the Beqaa Valley. The 1990s saw extensive use of SEAD, particularly during the Gulf War. During the Kosovo War in 1999, air defenses proved less vulnerable and more effective with the downing of an F-117A Nighthawk marking the first combat loss of a stealth aircraft. In the Iraq War of the 2000s, coalition aircraft targeted Iraqi SAMs during the opening phase of the conflict, yet aerial strikes were usually performed from stand-off distances to avoid these defenses, and low-level flight was avoided. In the Russo-Ukrainian War, while many Ukrainian air defense facilities were reportedly destroyed or damaged in the first days of full-scale invasion by Russian air strikes, Russia may not have been able to gain aerial superiority; it has been alleged that Ukrainian mid-range SAM sites have forced planes to fly low, but this makes them vulnerable to shoulder-launched surface-to-air missiles.

== History ==
=== Pre-Vietnam War ===
Before the Vietnam War, SEAD was an undefined mission: although attempts to destroy enemy air defense sites were undertaken, they were done so by individual aircraft against specific targets or operations, not as part of an overall strategy or doctrine of defense suppression. Near the end of the Second World War, US Navy pilots developed a doctrine that could be considered the first example of SEAD. When attacking enemy warships, US Navy fighters would attack enemy warships with machine guns and rockets to distract and or kill the enemy anti aircraft gunners while the torpedo and dive bombers could move in and more accurately target the ship. While crude, these tactics were frequently effective for their time.

==== World War II ====
During the Battle of Britain, the German Luftwaffe attempted to destroy Great Britain's Chain Home radar stations in order to degrade the British air defense network. However, German High Command failed to realize the efficiency of not only the radar stations themselves but the command and control system directing Britain's air defenses. After initial optimism regarding the radar sites' destruction, it was eventually decided to halt these attacks altogether except for exceptional circumstances. As the air war in Europe shifted in favor of the Allies, the Germans relied heavily on their AAA to defend against bombing attacks. This was borne out in Allied aircraft losses between 1943 and 1944, where losses to enemy fighters were cut in half but losses to flak increased tenfold.

Understanding the importance of Germany's radar sites, the Allies directed attacks against these installations and introduced new technology to counteract the effects of radar-directed AAA, including CARPET (US) and WINDOW (UK). A change in tactics saw bomber formations flying higher and more spread out to avoid the effects of flak. Bombing missions were also carried out to accomplish the physical destruction of AAA sites, using imagery intelligence to locate the weapons and employing both heavy bombers and fighter-bombers to destroy them. The P-47 Thunderbolt in particular was chosen for this task due to its ability to survive enemy fire. The effect of these missions varied, with losses suffered by fighter-bombers much higher—up to 40% in some cases—on account of their low-altitude attacks. Artillery also played a major role in suppressing air defenses, with the British Army the first to develop what became known as counterflak or "Apple Pie" missions. These missions were first employed to limited effect during the Battle of France but matured as the war progressed. The largest SEAD mission in history took place on March 24, 1945, when artillery forces of the British XII Corps attempted to knock out the local German air defense network in support of Operation Varsity. Although twenty-four thousand artillery shells were fired over the course of twenty-two minutes at some one hundred targets, the mission was unsuccessful due to inaccurate targeting data and insufficient firepower.

In the Pacific Theater, the Japanese had made only limited progress in developing radar for air defense and what systems they did have were primitive and easy to avoid. Nevertheless, as the Americans began the bombing campaign against Japan there was concern over the large number of radar sites located on the home islands. For this purpose B-24 Liberators and B-29 Superfortresses were fitted with radar-homing devices to conduct "ferret" missions to locate and identify radar transmissions. The information brought back from these missions was used to outfit other B-29s with radar jammers and chaff to confuse Japanese air defense radars as they conducted their missions. B-25 Mitchells were also outfitted with radar-homing equipment and used to lead "hunter-killer" teams of other B-25s in locating and destroying Japanese early-warning radar sites.

==== Korean War ====
While there were some technological changes between World War II and the Korean War, many of the tactics for dealing with enemy air defenses remained the same. For aircraft performing missions at low altitudes, AAA remained a constant danger; in fact, it was less dangerous for a UNC pilot to engage in air-to-air combat than it was to attack ground targets. The terrain and weather of the Korean Peninsula also contributed to the dangers associated with ground-attack missions. Nevertheless, the advent of jet aircraft brought about many changes. Compared to propeller aircraft, jets were much faster, could climb more steeply, were more resistant to damage and were quieter in operation. They were thus able to more effectively attack ground targets and escape, and while both jet- and propeller-driven aircraft participated in the Korean War the latter suffered heavier losses and were largely phased out by the end of the conflict.

As the war progressed, the Communists developed a highly centralized integrated air defense network, incorporating early-warning radars, ground-controlled interception (GCI) and AAA. The potency of this network compelled UNC bombers to conduct bombing missions at altitudes beyond the reach of ground-based weapons, although this impacted the accuracy of their bombs. The UNC also possessed an effective air defense network, but the North Korean Air Force had been largely destroyed early in the war and the Chinese Air Force was almost exclusively focused on the mission of air superiority rather than attacking UNC ground forces.

=== Vietnam War ===
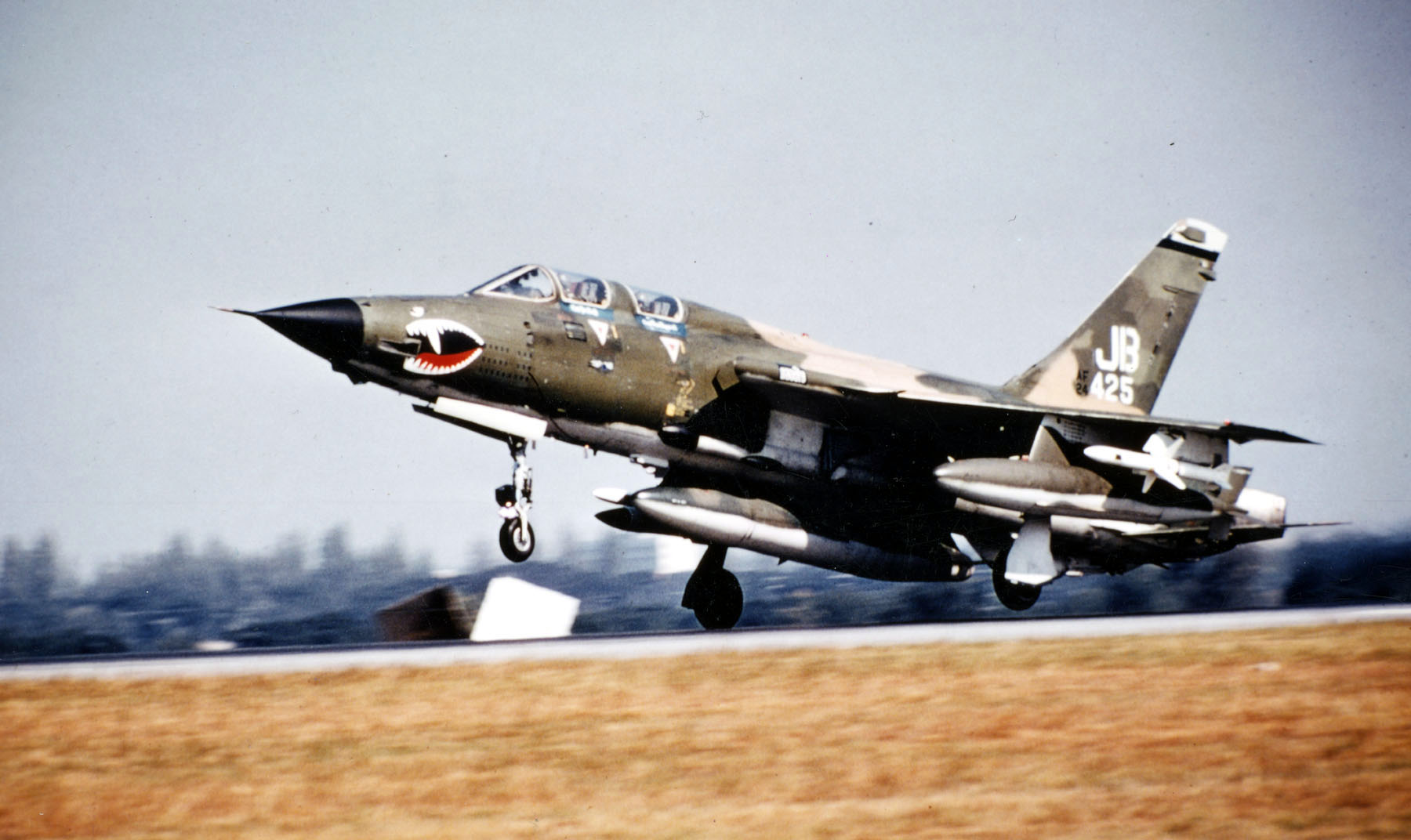
An F-105G Thunderchief 'Wild Weasel' carrying AGM-45 and AGM-78 missiles taking off from Korat Royal Thai Air Force Base.

The Vietnam War saw the evolution of what would become known as SEAD over the course of the conflict. At the start of Operation Rolling Thunder, North Vietnam's air defenses were only dealt with in a piecemeal fashion, in spite of intelligence indicating that the North Vietnam Army was developing an integrated air defense system (IADS) dedicated to air deniability. This included the construction of sixty SA-2 Guideline SAM sites by the end of 1965 which, though only accomplishing one hit for every thirteen missiles fired, were responsible for shooting down nearly 15% of American aircraft lost that year. Early attempts to counter this system consisted of modified F-100 Super Sabres using crude homing equipment to locate and bomb radar-guided SAM and AAA sites, but these missions incurred heavy losses and the threat to American aircraft continued to grow. In 1966 a task force was put together to analyze the challenges presented by the NVA's air defense network and recommend ways to counter it. One of these was for aircraft to operate at low altitudes (below 500 meters) where the missiles were less effective. This also put the aircraft well within range of AAA, which would account for nearly 85% of all American aircraft losses during Rolling Thunder.

Eventually new SEAD-dedicated aircraft were introduced, the Air Force's EF-105F/F-105G Thunderchief and Navy's A-6B Intruder, which mounted more sophisticated detection equipment and carried the AGM-45 Shrike and AGM-78 Standard anti-radiation missiles (ARMs). These fighter-bombers became very adept at tracking down and destroying ground-based air defense weapons, such that it became common for a vast majority of NVA SAM operators to turn off their radars whenever an F-105G was spotted. While this prevented the SAM from physically being destroyed, it essentially accomplished the same mission of suppressing air defenses around the target. Electronic warfare aircraft were also used to suppress air defenses by jamming NVA radars, with first the EB-66 Destroyer joined later by the EA-6B Prowler. By the end of Rolling Thunder these changes had caused a significant degradation in the effectiveness of SAMs: only one SA-2 missile out of every forty-eight fired resulted in a hit. In spite of these changes, SEAD remained a primarily tactical function throughout Rolling Thunder, with American leadership either unaware or unappreciative of North Vietnam's IADS.

Losses suffered by F-105 Wild Weasels spurred on the development of a new variant based on the F-4C Phantom II, the EF-4C Phantom Wild Weasel IV. The first thirty-six of these were delivered to Southeast Asia in 1969 and so missed taking part in Rolling Thunder. While carrying the same electronics as in the F-105G, the dense internal structure of the F-4 Phantom prevented the EF-4C from efficiently mounting this equipment, which meant it could not carry the superior AGM-78 Standard missile. By the start of Operation Linebacker, Wild Weasel missions were both more and less effective. Tactics and technology had evolved which improved the suppression of individual SAM sites, however the American military still failed to consider the integrated nature of North Vietnam's air defense network. Not only did the network possess thousands of radar- and optical-guided AAA and SAM sites, it also consisted of early-warning radars, intelligence-gathering agencies, and hundreds of ground-controlled interceptors. Thus, while fewer American aircraft were lost to SAMs during Linebacker, many more were lost in air-to-air combat.

Operation Linebacker II started off similarly to Linebacker I with regards to SEAD tactics but was remarkable for the introduction of B-52 Stratofortress bombers in the defense-suppression role. During the early part of the operation, a combination of poor tactical employment and overconfidence on the part of Strategic Air Command resulted in the loss of a number of B-52s to SA-2 missiles, enough to force a rethink in how to counteract the enemy's air defenses. The latter part of Linebacker II finally saw a concerted effort made to suppress the entire North Vietnamese IADS and significantly reduced the losses suffered. Only one SA-2 missile for every sixty-eight fired resulted in a hit, the lowest ratio of the entire war. The SEAD tactics displayed at the end of Linebacker II, involving the combination of traditional understanding of SEAD with electronic warfare and C^{3} countermeasures, laid the groundwork for future development.

=== Post-Vietnam Wars ===
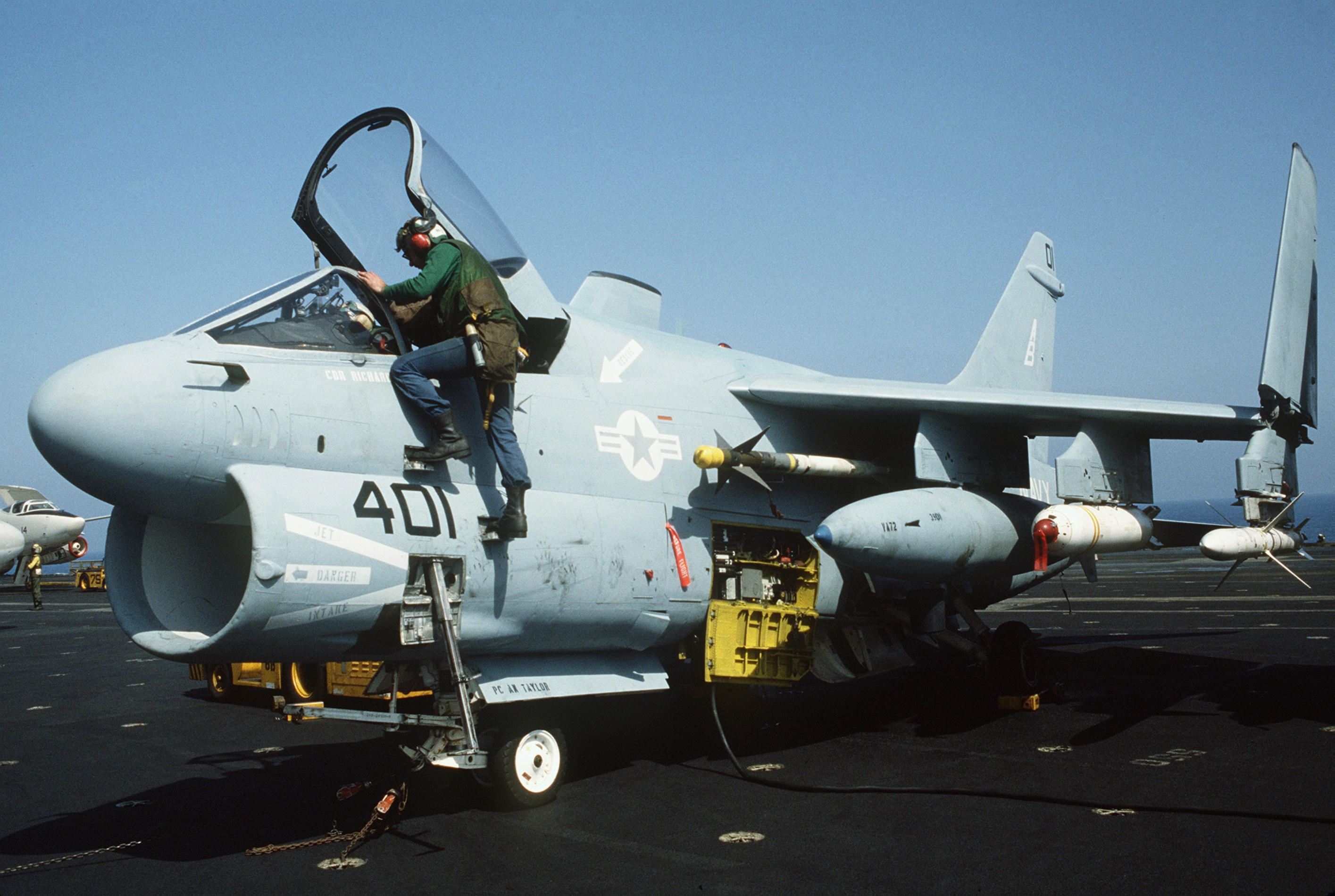
An A-7E from the USS America is armed with AGM-45 Shrike ARMs, in preparation of Operation El Dorado Canyon

With the phase-out of the F-105G, the US Air Force was in need of a new SEAD-dedicated aircraft. This effort was given more urgency in 1973 when, during the Yom Kippur War, Egypt employed a Soviet-built IADS that severely mauled the Israeli Air Force. After a series of tests, the new F-4G 'Wild Weasel V' first took flight in 1975 and became operational in 1978. Built on the F-4E airframe, the F-4G removed the M61 Vulcan pod to make room for specialized detection and jamming equipment and could carry the latest anti-radiation missile, the AGM-88 HARM. The F-4G Wild Weasel was then joined by EF-111A Raven and EC-130H Compass Call to become part of the USAF's "triad" of electronic combat aircraft. Each aircraft performed its own role in the overall mission of SEAD: the F-4G with seeking out and destroying enemy air defenses, the EC-130 with degrading the enemy's C^{3} capabilities, and the EF-111A with jamming enemy early-warning and target-acquisition radars. Additional aircraft often part of SEAD missions included the E-3 Sentry, EC-130E Commando Solo and RC/EC-135.

On the other hand, the Soviets did not treat SEAD as an independent air operation but as a tactical role to be performed as part of a larger mission, namely an overwhelming air assault against NATO. This role was not carried out by SEAD-specific aircraft but normal bombers and fighter aircraft, such as the Tupolev Tu-16 and Tupolev Tu-22M, which could carry Soviet anti-radiation missiles. These aircraft would be organized into several strike groups whose mission was to lay down "chaff corridors" 40–50 kilometers across at intervals of 10 kilometers, including directly on top of suspected SAM sites. A small number of aircraft in these groups would be equipped with ARMs to physically destroy the sites. These missions were conducted against pre-planned targets which had been previously identified by signals intelligence and other reconnaissance efforts, rather than having aircraft seek out targets of opportunity. The closest the Soviets came to dedicated SEAD platforms were modified stand-off interceptors like the Mikoyan MiG-25BM and attack aircraft like the Sukhoi Su-24M.

The first example of a post-Vietnam SEAD campaign was by the United Kingdom during the 1982 Falklands War. The RAF Avro Vulcan B.Mk-2 was initially planned to be retired in early 1982 but the outbreak of the Falklands War, in April that year postponed it. The Falklands conflict was the only time that the Vulcan performed SEAD missions, flying very long-range missions against Port Stanley, armed with AGM-45 Shrike missiles mounted on makeshift underwing pylons and carrying a AN/ALQ-101 pod for jamming.

Shortly afterwards was Israel's Operation Mole Cricket 19, launched at the start of the 1982 Lebanon War. During the prior Yom Kippur War of 1973, Egyptian and Syrian SAM batteries proved to be costly to attack for the Israeli Air Force (IAF), such as during Operation Model 5; during the first three days of the war alone, the IAF lost 50 aircraft in about 1,220 sorties, a loss rate of four percent. The IAF found it challenging to provide air support to ground forces. Shortly after the conflict's end, the service stated a multiyear project, active between 1973 and 1978, specifically to devise an effective counter to the SAM threat. By 1982, the Bekaa Valley had been heavily reinforced by the Syrian Armed Forces with a modern Soviet-style air defense network consisting of multiple radar installations, GCI facilities, SAM and AAA sites, and a redundant C^{3} network. Prior to the start of the operation, Israel conducted an extensive intelligence-gathering effort, consisting of reconnaissance aircraft, remotely piloted vehicles (RPVs) and electronic surveillance aircraft, to paint an expansive picture of where Syrian air defense sites were located and which radar frequencies they were using.

Israel's attack on the SAMs was inadvertently assisted by the Syrians, who often placed their sites in sub-optimal positions and failed to move their equipment, use dummy radars or maintain active combat air patrol. When the operation began, efficient coordination of jamming/deception efforts with attacks against air defense sites effectively neutralized the ground component of the Bekaa Valley IADS. In response to the attacks, the Syrians launched a large number of fighter aircraft, however without the aid of their radar and GCI facilities, these forces were "flying blind" and suffered crippling losses in the resulting air-to-air combat. So complete and disturbing was the Israeli dismantling of the Bekaa Valley IADS that the deputy commander of the Soviet Air Defense Forces was sent to investigate what had gone wrong. Part of Israel's success was due to extensive reconnaissance and preparations prior to the battle, incompetence on the part of the Syrians, and desert conditions conducive to SEAD operations.

Operation El Dorado Canyon, the United States' response to the 1986 Berlin discotheque bombing, employed lessons learned from the Bekaa Valley campaign, including extensive planning and practice runs. In contrast to the Israeli mission though the goal of El Dorado Canyon was not the destruction of Libya's IADS itself but to conduct a punitive strike against Muammar Gaddafi. Suppressing the IADS through non-lethal means would help accomplish this mission and, just as important after the Vietnam War, reduce casualties suffered by the strike group. For this reason, electronic jamming played a more prominent role in the operation than at Bekaa Valley and was carried out by both EF-111A Ravens and EA-6B Prowlers in the first ever joint US Air Force-Navy SEAD operation. For several reasons, F-4G Wild Weasels could not take part in El Dorado Canyon, requiring the use of the Navy's carrier-borne A-7E Corsair IIs and F/A-18 Hornets to attack Libyan SAM sites. Their lack of the Wild Weasel's specialized equipment required these fighters to fire their HARMs preemptively at Libyan SAM sites, a costly and wasteful method which nevertheless was effective due to the limited nature of the raid. For their part, the Libyans and their Soviet advisers had also learned lessons from the Bekaa Valley campaign: their IADS was constructed with multiple redundancies (including overlapping radar coverage and hardened landlines between defense sites) and a wider array of both Soviet and Western radar systems able to operate on multiple frequencies to avoid jamming. In the end, US forces succeeded in suppressing the Libyan IADS and conducted their punitive strike with minimal casualties suffered.

=== Gulf War ===
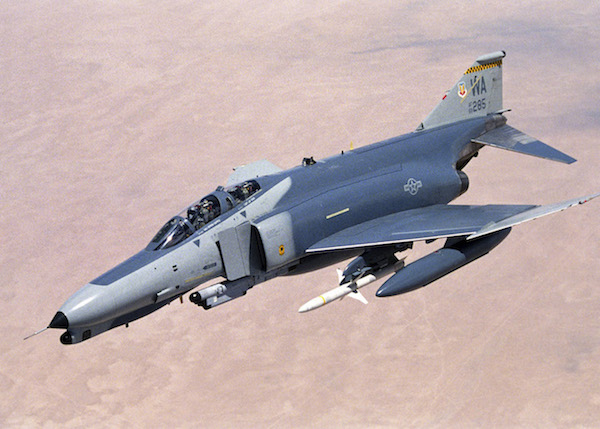
The F-4G Wild Weasel played a major role during the war.

Intense aerial attacks of Iraq's integrated air defenses were conducted during Operation Instant Thunder, the Coalition's aerial attacks at the start of the conflict; Iraqi SAM operators regularly resorted to firing missiles with minimal or no guidance due to fears that radar use brought quick retaliation. All Iraqi air defenses in the south were destroyed, although the skies remained unsafe for low altitude flight.

Coalition forces made extensive use of SEAD during the Gulf War against Iraq in order to counter its – at least on paper – formidable IADS. By 1990 Iraq was protected by approximately 3,700 SAMs, organized into 105 firing batteries, and approximately 7,000 AAA pieces, supported by hundreds of overlapping early warning, search and acquisition radars. In the air the Iraq Air Force was the sixth largest in the world, including hundreds of interceptors which were housed and protected within hardened bunkers. At the center of the Iraqi IADS was Kari, an automated command and control system developed by Iraq and built by French contractors in the wake of Operation Opera (Kari in turn is the French spelling of Iraq backwards). Kari tied the entire IADS to a single location, the national Air Defense Operations Center (ADOC) located in an underground bunker in Baghdad, and in turn divided the country into four defense sectors each overseen by a Sector Operations Center (SOC) located at H-3, Kirkuk, Taji and Talil; a fifth SOC was added at Ali Al Salem to cover the recently conquered Kuwait. Each SOC oversaw the local airspace and commanded anywhere from two to five Intercept Operations Centers (IOCs) per sector. The IOCs were located in bunkers constructed at Iraqi Air Force bases and tied into local radar systems, whose information they could pass on to their SOC and thence on to Baghdad. In this way a SOC was capable of simultaneously tracking 120 aircraft and selecting for the appropriate weapon system to engage them. The SOC could automatically target for SA-2 and SA-3 SAM systems in their sector, which meant the SAMs did not have to turn on their own radar and reveal their position, or an IOC could direct local interceptors to engage the targets. Baghdad itself was one of the most heavily defended cities in the world – more heavily defended several times over than Hanoi during the Vietnam War – protected by 65% of Iraq's SAMs and over half of its AAA pieces.

However, the Iraqi IADS had several fatal flaws of which Coalition air forces were able to take advantage. The system was primarily oriented towards defending against much smaller attacks from Iraq's most likely enemies – Iran, Syria and Israel – and focused on point defense rather than area defense. This meant there were significant gaps in its coverage, particularly on the orientation from Saudi Arabia straight to Baghdad, and attacking aircraft would be able to approach their target from multiple directions. Much of the Iraqi air defense equipment was also quite outdated: Iraqi SA-2 and SA-3 systems were nearing the end of their operational lifespan and their countermeasures well known at this point, while what SA-6, SA-8 and Roland systems they possessed weren't much younger either. Likewise a majority of Iraq's interceptor force were less-capable MiG-21s, with fewer more modern variants including export versions of the MiG-29 and F1 Mirage. Furthermore, the IADS was centralized to a fault. Although each IOC was datalinked to their respective SOC and in turn back to the ADOC, the defense sectors couldn't share information between each other. If a SOC was knocked out of action the attached air defense weapons lost all ability to coordinate their response; its respective SAM batteries would be forced to rely on their own radar systems while most AAA guns lacked any radar guidance. Training was also poor, with Iraqi pilots overly reliant on ground-control instructions such that if the IOCs were disabled they lost situation awareness and became easy targets.

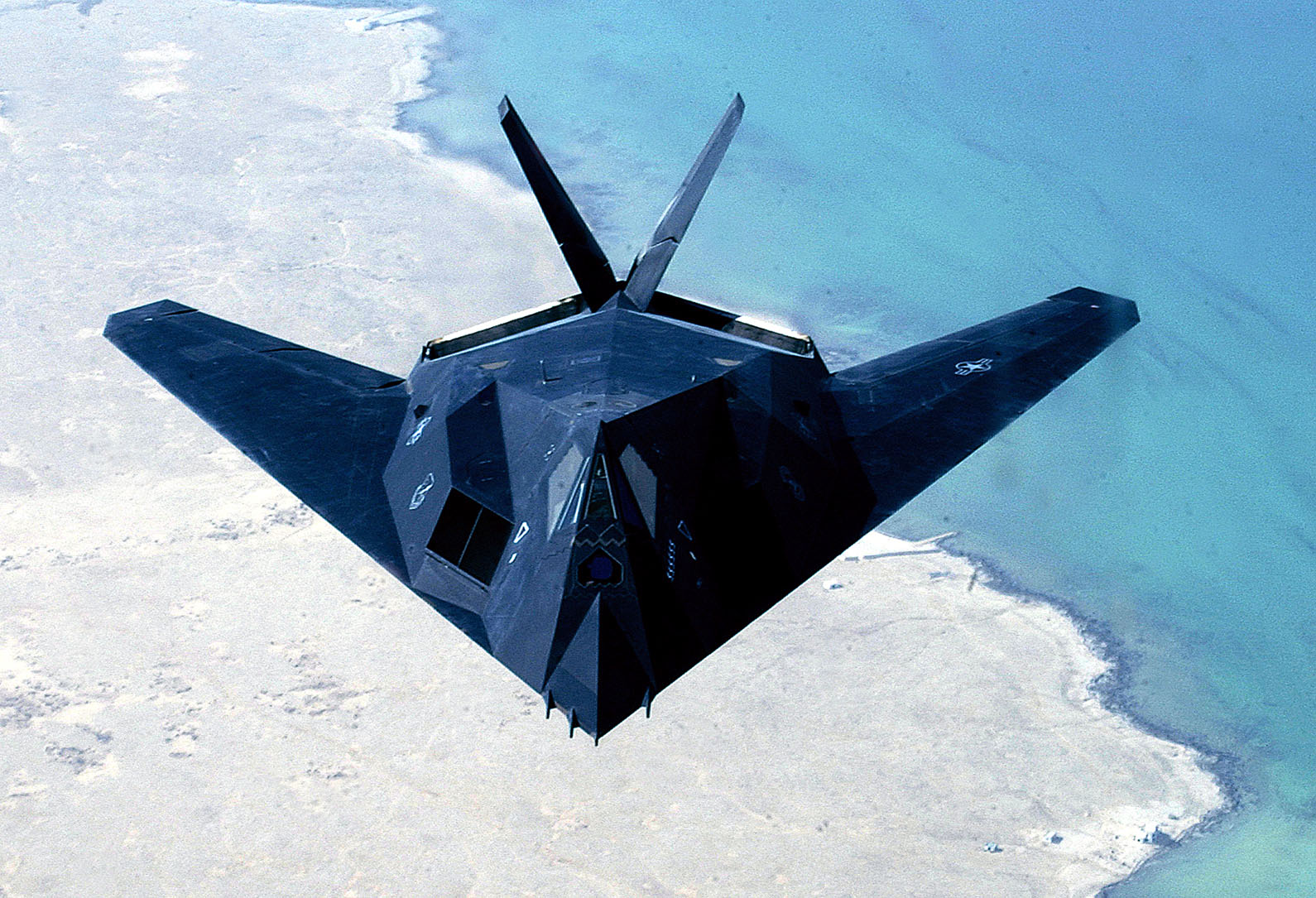
An F-117A Nighthawk flying over the Persian Gulf.

Suppression of the Iraqi IADS played a prominent role in Operation Instant Thunder, the preliminary air campaign plan against Iraq which served as the basis for Operation Desert Storm's air campaign. In its initial limited form, Instant Thunder called for three dedicated SEAD squadrons which would significantly degrade the IADS enough to allow decimating strikes against Iraq's military and political leadership and other strategic targets. This role for SEAD was further expanded as the mission grew in scope, involving a larger number of aircraft to completely destroy the air defenses protecting southern Iraq and Kuwait. Planning for this mission was helped when the CIA contacted the French engineer responsible for designing the Kari IADS and passed along information about its vulnerabilities and limitations. In its final form, Phase II of the Desert Storm air campaign sought to decimate the southern Iraqi IADS within two days of the start of hostilities. F-4G Wild Weasels and other aircraft capable of carrying HARM missiles would destroy air defense sites themselves, electronic warfare aircraft would disrupt radars and other systems, and additional targets would be struck in order to support this mission, such as temporarily knocking out Iraq's electrical infrastructure. In addition to traditional SEAD systems the Persian Gulf War would also see the use of unconventional assets in knocking out Iraq's air defenses, in particular cruise missiles and F-117A Nighthawks, which would be used to attack sensitive targets.

The opening shots of Operation Desert Storm were fired on January 17 in pursuit of defense-suppression: at 2:20AM local time Task Force Normandy, a group of twelve American helicopters, infiltrated into Iraq with the goal of destroying two early-warning radar sites. Three MH-53J Pave Lows guided nine AH-64 Apaches to the targets, which the gunships destroyed, opening a hole in the Iraqi IADS for the initial wave of aircraft to exploit. Two F-117As knocked out the Nukhayb IOC, further widening the gap, although their next attack against the H-3 SOC was unsuccessful. Among the first targets hit by F-117As attacking into Baghdad, bombs damaged the Al Taqaddum IOC and Talil SOC, shortly followed by Tomahawk strikes that disabled the electrical grid upon which Kari depended; reportedly some used special warheads filled with carbon fiber bundles to short-circuit the network. For the next several hours dozens of Coalition aircraft poured into Iraq. Those which weren't specifically directed to suppress air defenses had significant SEAD escort, including the use of BQM-74 drones and ADM-141 TALD decoys which would both "take the hit" for the manned airplanes and cause the Iraqis to reveal their position when they tracked or fired upon the lure. The first night's largest sortie was a joint US Air Force-Navy SEAD mission consisting of fifty aircraft designed to look like a bombing raid on Baghdad but which instead were fitted out with decoys, drones and HARMs to destroy air defenses protecting the city. With Kari degraded due to the disabling of the civilian electrical grid the Iraqi SAMs were forced to use their organic radar, producing what one pilot called "HARM Heaven". A total of 67 HARMs were fired over the course of twenty minutes, causing a significant reduction in Iraqi air defenses around the capital based on follow-up missions.

Throughout the rest of the first night additional air-defense targets were hit by Coalition aircraft with varying levels of success while strikes against other targets consisted of a high ratio of SEAD and escort to strike aircraft. This pace of attack against air-defense and other targets continued into the first day, involving a variety of different aircraft, and spread to targets in Kuwait. A-10 Thunderbolt IIs were used to attack early-warning radars and similar sites along the border in operations known humorously as "Wart Weaseling" (a play on the Wild Weasel and the A-10 "Warthog" nicknames). Unable to use Kari and fearful of turning their own radars on, Iraqi SAM operators resorted to firing their missiles with minimal or no guidance. Furthermore, units of the Iraqi Army – even the elite Republican Guard – possessed inadequate SAM defenses by NATO or Soviet standards. This allowed Coalition aircraft to attack them from the relative safety of higher altitudes.

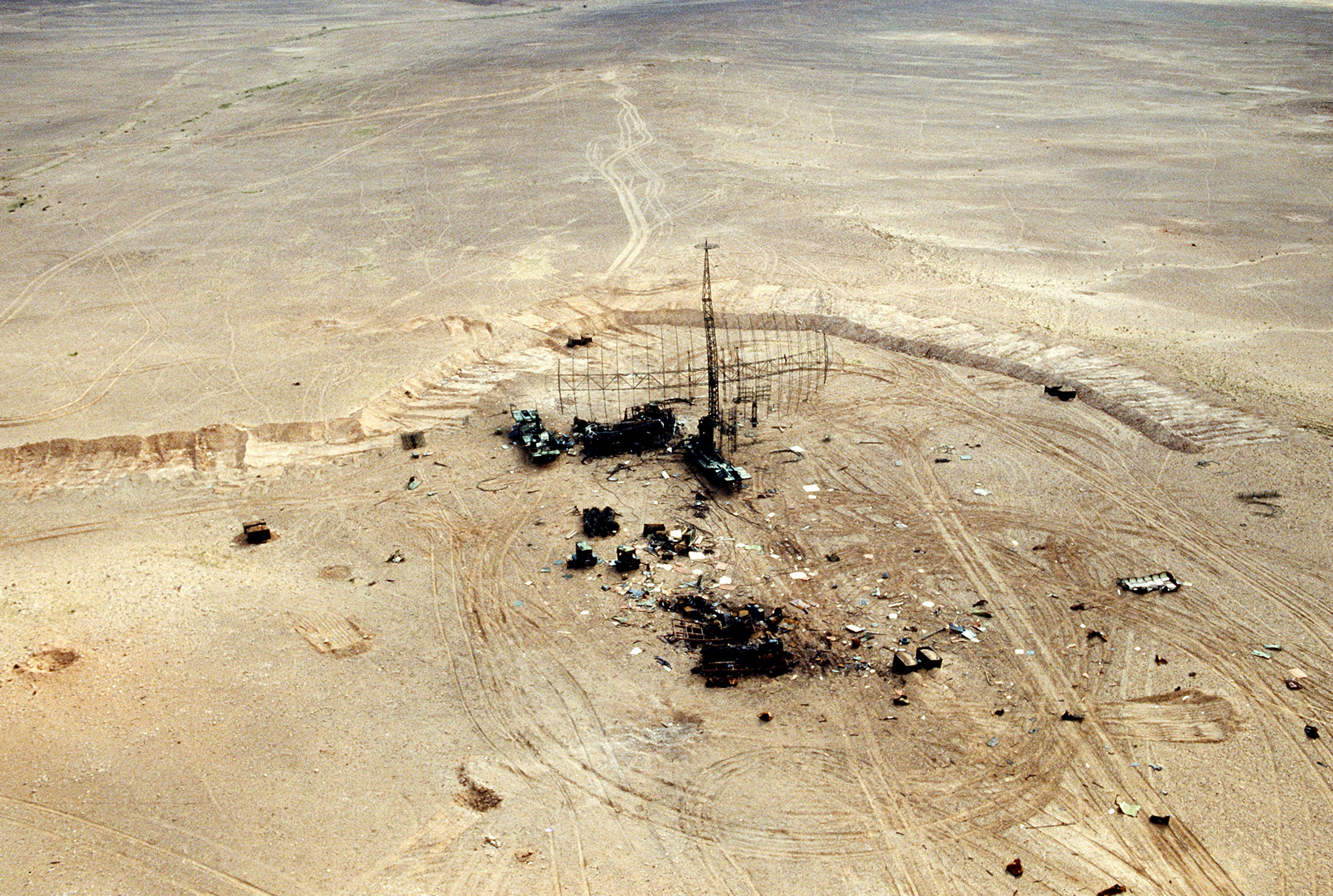
An Iraqi radar site destroyed by the French 6th Light Armoured Division during Operation Desert Storm.

By the end of the first forty-eight hours of Desert Storm, the Coalition had achieved its goal of significantly degrading Kari, including the destruction of all air defenses in the south. Although the Iraqis would replace most destroyed radars and bring back many IOCs and SOCs to at least partial operation, this was done so in an unorganized manner, with the Coalition continuing to bomb any reactivated sites. In effect, combined with the failure of Iraq's air force to defend its airspace, the Coalition had gained air supremacy in the skies over Iraq from nearly the outset of the conflict.

Coalition aircraft conducting strategic bombing and interdiction inside Iraq were now free to operate at medium altitudes of 10,000 ft (3,000 m) and higher with no danger of SAM activity. This also put them beyond the effective range of most of Iraq's AAA pieces, which remained a threat. Baghdad's heavy AAA defenses also continued to make it a difficult target to attack, as Coalition forces found out during an attempted strike on January 19 against the Tuwaitha Nuclear Research Center. A variety factors, including the threat of AAA and ballistic SAMs, resulted in the strike's failure and loss of two aircraft.

By January 27, no C^{3} activity was detected at the SOC level by Coalition forces, and only limited activity at the IOC level. At the end of the conflict, the DIA estimated Kari was operating at 25% its original capacity, and that it would take at least ten years to rebuild the system and another five to retrain the personnel needed to operate it. In total, the SEAD campaign by the Coalition was an unequivocal success, allowing Coalition aircraft to fly at medium and high altitudes over Kuwait and Iraq with impunity. The only losses Coalition aircraft suffered to Iraqi air defenses after the first two days occurred when they operated at low altitudes, primarily conducting close air support or other missions to assist ground forces.

=== Operation Allied Force ===
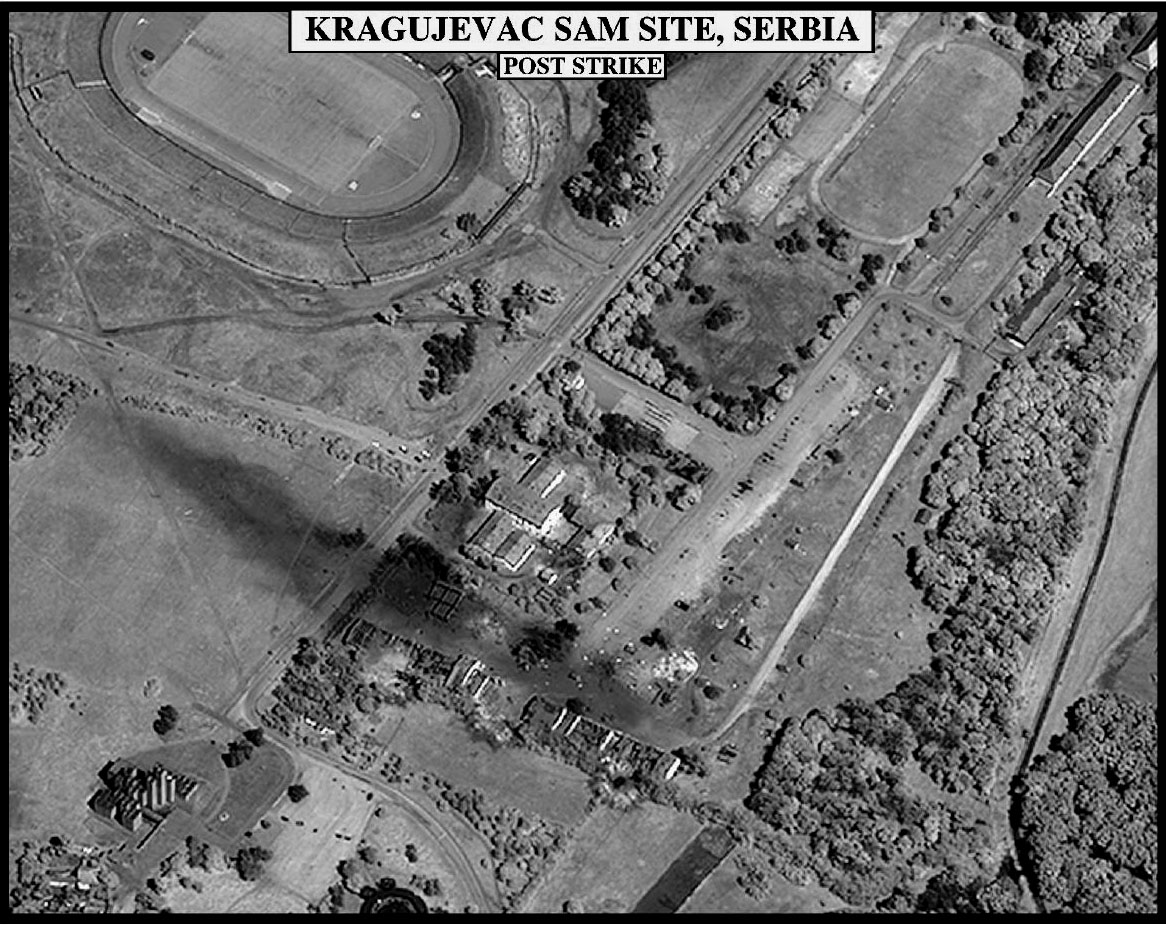
Post-strike bomb damage assessment of a SAM site in Kragujevac, Serbia

The bombing campaign of the Federal Republic of Yugoslavia during mid-1999, dubbed Operation Allied Force, was an overall success for NATO forces, but the mission to suppress Yugoslav air defenses proved to be more difficult than prior operations during the Gulf War. SEAD operations for NATO were principally carried out by the US Air Force, with fifty F-16CJ Block 50 Fighting Falcons, and the US Navy and Marines, with 30 EA-6B Prowlers; additional support was provided by Italian and German Tornado ECRs, a purpose-developed SEAD model. Many NATO aircraft were furnished with new towed decoys designed to lure away any missiles fired at them, and reportedly for the first time cyberwarfare was used to target Yugoslav air defense computer systems.

However, a number of deficiencies in NATO's SEAD operations were revealed during the course of the bombing campaign. The US Air Force had allowed its electronic warfare branch to atrophy in the years after the Gulf War, resulting in greater response times to engaging a SAM threat. Airspace restrictions and rules of engagement limited where NATO aircraft could fly and what targets they could hit, leaving some air defense systems untouched. Kosovo's mountainous terrain also made it difficult for NATO to locate and target Yugoslav air defenses, while at the same time the region's poor infrastructure limited where Yugoslav SAM and AAA sites could be placed. Furthermore, according to a post-conflict US intelligence report, Yugoslavia had a spy in NATO's headquarters in Brussels who in the early part of the conflict leaked flight plans and target details to the Yugoslav military, allowing Yugoslav military assets to be relocated to avoid detection; NATO responded by limiting the number of people with access to its plans, which appeared to be successful.

Yugoslavia had a much smaller IADS than Iraq during the Gulf War, but took greater steps at preserving it from NATO's bombing campaign. The Yugoslav integrated air defence system (IADS) was extensive, including underground command sites and buried landlines, which allowed for information to be shared between systems; thus, active radar in one area could target NATO aircraft for SAMs and AAA in another area with no active radar, further limiting NATO's ability to target air defences. By focusing on its operational survival, Yugoslav air defenses ceded a certain amount of air superiority to NATO forces. Yet the persistence of their credible SAM threat forced NATO to allocate greater resources to continued SEAD operations rather than conducting other missions, while Yugoslav AAA and MANPADS forced NATO aircraft to fly at 15,000 ft (4,600 m) or higher. NATO reportedly fired 743 HARMs during the course of the 78-day campaign, but could confirm the destruction of only three of the original 25 SA-6 batteries. At the same time, over 800 SAMs were fired by Yugoslav forces at NATO aircraft, including 477 SA-6s and 124 confirmed MANPADS, for the downing of only two aircraft and several more damaged. That one of the two aircraft shot down was an F-117A Nighthawk marked the first combat loss ever of a stealth aircraft and typified some of the issues NATO faced during the campaign.

=== 2003 US invasion of Iraq ===
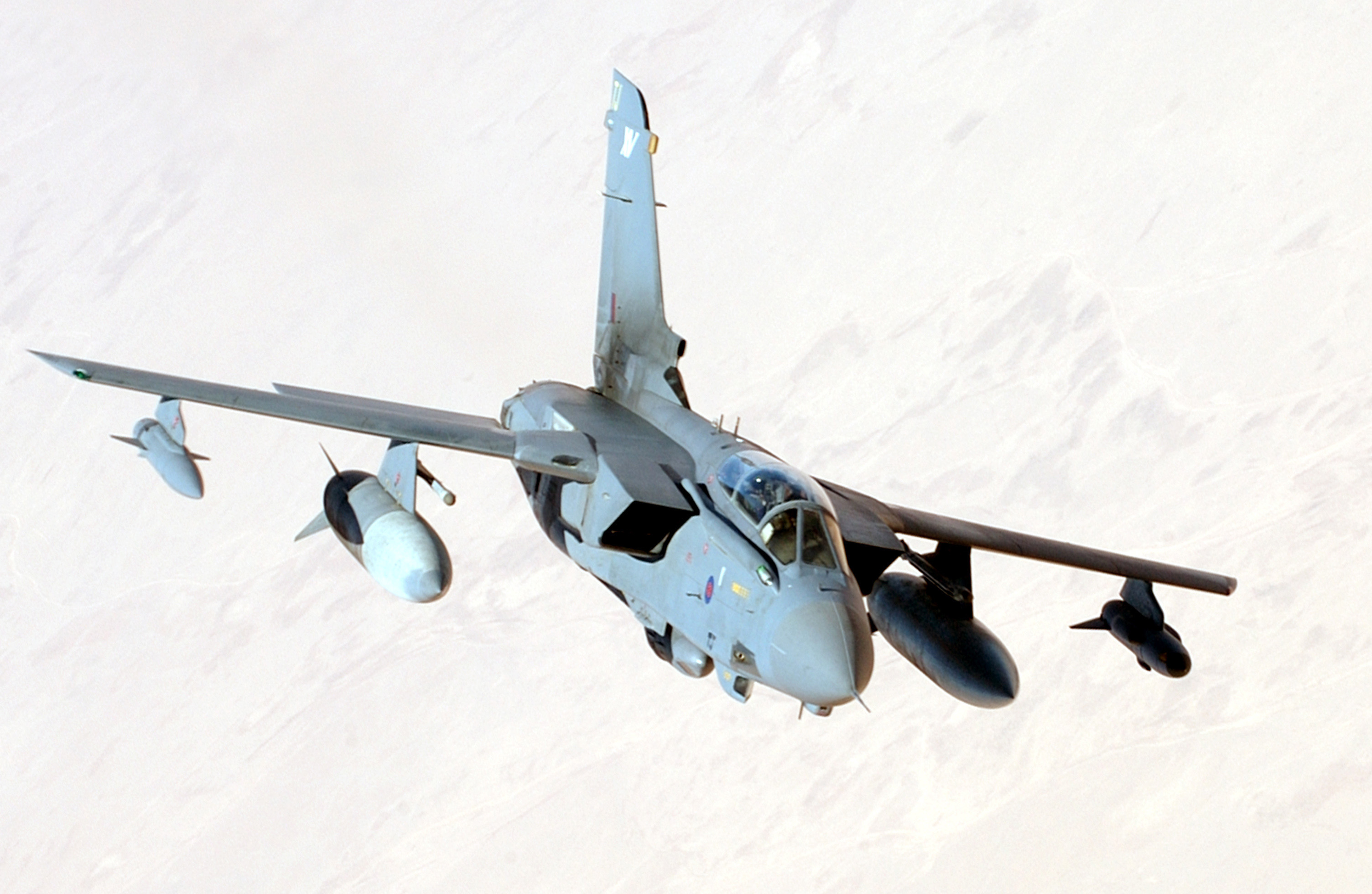
Tornado GR4 ZA557 of No. XV (Reserve) Squadron in flight over Iraq during Operation Telic, August 2004

At the onset of the Iraq War, Iraq's IADS was a fraction of what it had been during the Gulf War, though it was still one of the densest defense networks in the world. Over 200 SAM systems were still operational, mainly the older SA-2s, SA-3s and SA-6s, along with over 2,000 MANPADS and large numbers of AA guns. Improvements had been made to Kari, including greater usage of fiber optic cables, and more advanced equipment such as GPS guidance jammers were acquired. In addition to the ADOC and four original SOCs, a fifth SOC was created in Baghdad and specifically assigned to defend Saddam's palaces, the Republican Guards, and key security facilities.

Still, the defense network was relatively outdated and thus unable to seriously challenge the Coalition's dominance of Iraqi airspace, which had not only succeeded in suppressing Iraqi defenses during the Gulf War but continued to do so during the enforcement of Iraqi no-fly zones. Starting on March 1, aggressive "enforcement" of the no-fly zones accounted for the destruction of as many as a third of Iraq's missile launchers and radars by the time the invasion commenced on March 20. Numerous aircraft, such as the Panavia Tornado fighter-bomber, penetrated Iraqi airspace to conduct bombing raids during the opening phase of the conflict, striking at Iraqi installations.

During the course of the invasion, there were 1,660 reports of SAM launches and similar numbers of AAA firings, for the loss of very few aircraft. While Iraq largely failed to shoot down many Coalition aircraft, the sheer numbers of their air defenses still made them dangerous until the final stages of the invasion. This was true in particular for its large number of short-range missile and AAA weapons, which made low-altitude missions deadly and were harder to suppress. Where possible, Coalition forces conducted stand-off strikes from outside the range of these defenses. The unsuccessful 2003 attack on Karbala exemplifies the dangers faced by aircraft operating at low altitudes around air defenses.

=== Russo-Ukrainian War ===
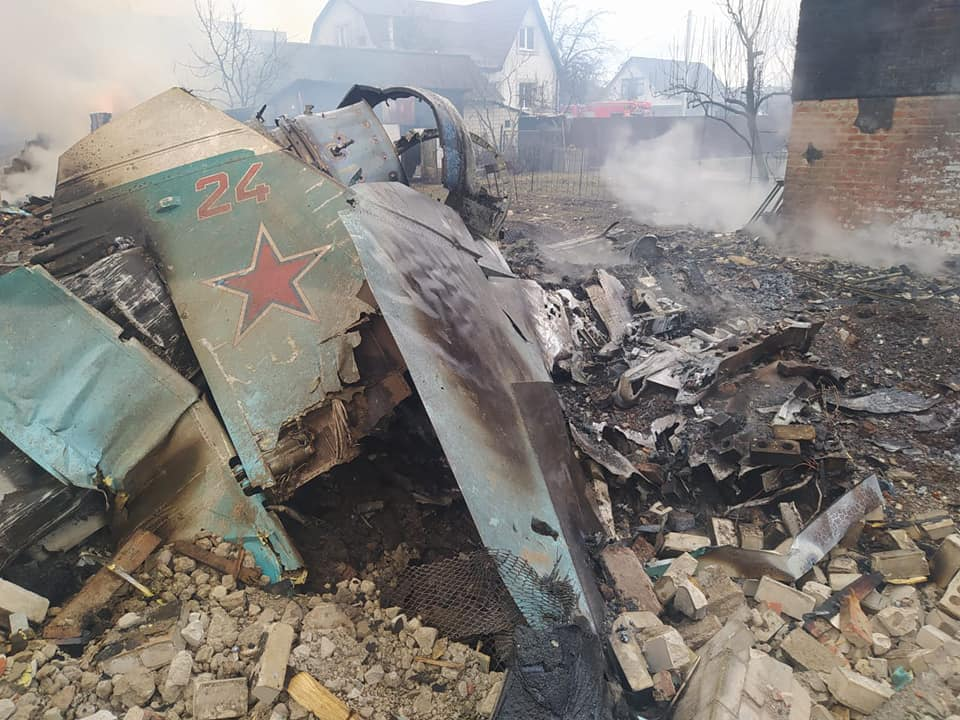
The remnants of a Russian Su-34 shot down over Chernihiv, Ukraine.

Many Ukrainian air defense facilities were reportedly destroyed or damaged in the first days of the full-scale invasion by Russian air strikes. On 5 March 2022, the Russian Aerospace Forces (VKS) declared that it had achieved air superiority, 11 days after the beginning of the invasion, but not air supremacy. (Note: "During Russia’s participation in the Syrian Civil War, only one of its aircraft, the Su-34 fighter-bomber, regularly used precision-guided munitions, Bronk explained, and even that aircraft often used unguided bombs and rockets.") However, that same day, Russia lost at least ten aircraft. On 11 March 2022, retired United States Air Force Lieutenant General David Deptula stated in The New York Times that the Russian Air Force had not achieved air superiority, noting that supposedly vulnerable Ukrainian drones had continued to operate against Russian forces.

While several early air strikes on Yavoriv in Western Ukraine were performed by Russian bombers, their munitions were firing from a distance while flying within Russian air space, rather than entering Ukrainian air space; on 13 March 2022, dozens of air-launched cruise missiles were launched from within Russia to reach Western Ukraine, because it was allegedly too dangerous for the Russian Air Force to fly over Ukrainian space due to Ukrainian air defenses. Ukrainian mid-range SAM sites forced planes to fly low, making them vulnerable to Stinger and other shoulder-launched surface-to-air missiles, while a lack of training and flight hours for Russian pilots allegedly rendered them inexperienced for the type of close ground support missions typical of modern air forces. On 18 May 2022, near Izyum, a Russian Zhitel electronic warfare apparatus was detected, located, and disabled by Ukraine's ground and air forces.

On 30 August 2022, Command of Ukrainian Air Force (KPS ZSU) released a video of its MiG-29 jets firing AGM-88 HARM missiles against Russian air defenses, one day after an alleged attack on Russian radar site for S-400 SAM batteries near Sevastopol in Russian-occupied Crimea. Earlier in the summer some the remains of AGM-88 missiles had been found. The U.S. government acknowledged the previously undisclosed transfer of AGM-88 missiles to Ukraine on August 8, 2022.

There were reports of M31A1 GMLRS guided rockets fired from M142 HIMARS rocket artillery been used by Ukrainian military against Russian air defense systems.

On 15 February 2023 the International Institute for Strategic Studies (IISS) wrote that neither the Russian Air Force (VVS) nor the Ukrainian Air Force (PS ZSU) have gained air superiority.

=== 2025 India-Pakistan conflict ===
During the 2025 India-Pakistan conflict, it was claimed by media reports early on that the Indian Air Force (IAF) had conducted SEAD/DEAD operations against Pakistan’s air defence systems. On 8 May, in an official statement, IAF claimed to have destroyed an air defence system at Lahore. IAI Harop loitering munitions were reportedly used to destroy a LY-80 Radar system, part of the Chinese-made HQ-16 medium-range SAM system. On 11 May, through a press briefing, an IAF official stated, using satellite imagery, that air defence radars at multiple locations across Pakistan (including PAF Base Sukkur, Pasrur, Chunian and Arif Wala) had apparently been damages during the strikes conducted over the course of the conflict, according to the alleged imagery. Pakistan denied losing any of its air defences over the course of the conflict. It stated that it disabled most its own radars early during the engagement in order to prevent them from being detected by Israel-made drones, which used by India and were sent to locate Pakistan's air defences, before destroying using a combination of soft kill, such as electronic warfare and jamming, and hard kill methods, by physically shooting them down using machine and antiaircraft guns.

The Pakistan Air Force (PAF) also conducted its own SEAD/DEAD operations during the conflict. The SEAD mission on 10 May reportedly involved a flight of 3 JF-17 Block II aircraft from 14 Squadron (nicknamed as the ‘Tail Choppers’) at the Rafiqui Air Base, each carrying 2 CM-400 missiles to target an S-400 system at the Adampur airbase while being escorted by 2 other JF-17s. The aircraft employed electronic countermeasures, decoys, and evasive manoeuvres to approach the S-400 system and fired CM-400AKG missiles at low-altitude and early-warning radar installations. The S-400's location was found by sending YIHA-III loitering munitions, which reportedly forced the system's radar to reveal its location by forcing it to shoot down the drone. India late displayed wreckage of the shot down YIHA drone. Pakistan said that a mobile 91N6E (NATO name "Big Bird") acquisition radar was destroyed by a CM-400AKG, and that a 96L6E (NATO name "Cheese Board") 3D early-warning and acquisition radar was also successfully targeted. The CM-400AKG missiles on the JF-17s had anti-radiation seekers and were launched with the intent of destroying the 96L6E "Cheesboard" radar at Adampur airbase which acted as the "eyes" of the air defence system. The Indian Air Force claimed that at least 60 missiles were fired towards the S-400 complex at Adampur airbase over the course of four days, and stated that the missile were launched with varying profiles, flying at speeds ranging from Mach 3.3 to Mach 5, but claimed that none of the missiles hit the S-400 launcher. Later-released low-resolution satellite imagery of the Adampur airbase, which was analysed by independent defence observers, had revealed evidence of burn marks and local disturbances on the ground at the suspected S-400 site, suggesting the missiles may have either successfully struck or degraded key major components of the air defence battery, such as potentially the radar. Later, the Prime Minister of India Narendra Modi visited the Adampur Air Force Station in Punjab on 13 May 2025, and posed in front of an S-400 system in the background that at least visually appeared undamaged. The Indian Prime Minister's photo op at Adampur airbase, posing in front of the S-400 launchers, did not show the 96L6E radar, which was what the PAF had claimed to have target and was not shown in the pictures taken, something also pointed out by the PAF's commander, Air Chief Marshal Zaheer Ahmad Babar Sidhu.

== Weapons ==
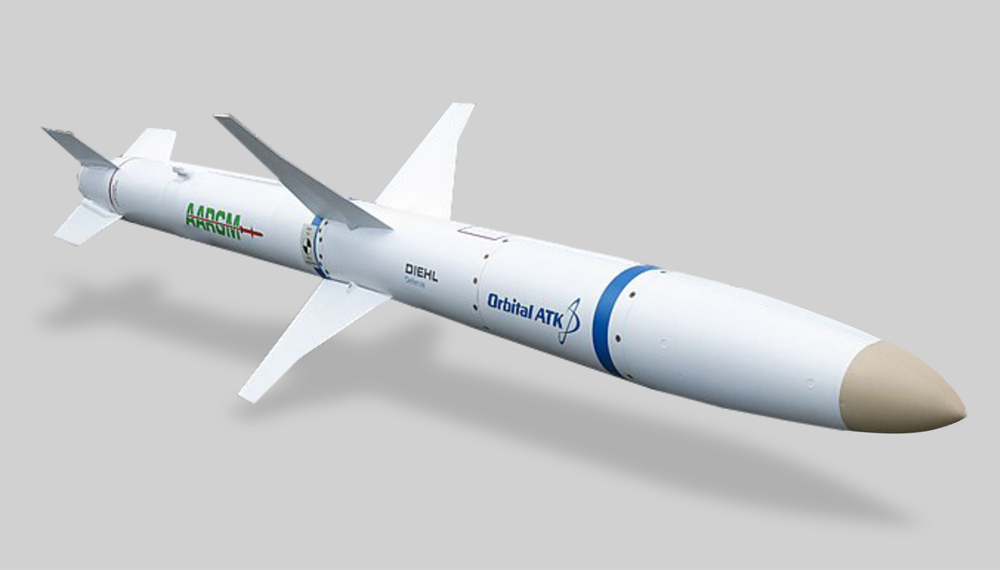
A mock-up of the AGM-88E AARGM

The weapons most often associated with this mission are anti-radiation missiles (ARMs), which work by homing in on radio emission sources like radar antennae. These missiles are equipped with relatively small warheads, limiting collateral damage, but can easily destroy radar antennae and thus cripple an enemy's air defense system. Early examples of ARMs could be fooled by turning off the radar system, which would cease emitting radiation for the missile to track; more recent missiles are fitted with fire-control systems which "remember" where the source was and continue towards that location. Anti-radiation missiles proved particularly effective during the Vietnam War where, despite the small number carried relative to other munitions, they accounted for 46% of all SA-2 batteries destroyed.

However, a weapon need not be designed specifically for SEAD missions to be used to damage or destroy a component of an air defense system. A Paveway LGB for example is not a SEAD-specific munition, but when used to destroy a radar antenna it still achieves the desired effect. The American AGM-154 Joint Standoff Weapon is a valuable SEAD weapon due to its fairly long standoff range which allows the launching aircraft to avoid being threatened by all but the longest-range missiles, and its relatively large area of destruction against lightly armored targets.

Possibly the most effective type of unguided ("dumb") weapon used during SEAD strikes are cluster bombs. This is due to the fact many SAM sites are dispersed over a fairly wide area (in order to increase the difficulty of inflicting serious damage on the battery) and the relative "softness" of the targets (unarmored missile launchers, exposed radar antennas, etc.). The Mk-20 Rockeye II anti-armor cluster munition and the CBU-87 general-purpose cluster munition are typical examples of these types of weapons.

Artillery is also used to conduct SEAD missions. After World War II, the combined arms nature of warfare meant an increased role in ground forces performing SEAD missions in support of air operations. During the Cold War the American military developed a joint definition of SEAD responsibilities, with the Army responsible for all SEAD missions within the range of observable fire and the Air Force for all missions further away. The Soviet Union placed less emphasis on using artillery to conduct SEAD missions, although where possible artillery would be used to clear a path for attack helicopters. Because of their superior range, rocket artillery such as MLRS are the ideal weapon for conducting SEAD operations.

Loitering Munitions and Unmanned Aerial Vehicles (UAVs) play an increasingly vital role in conducting SEAD missions. Due to the dangerous nature of attacking air defenses, the use of UAVs can provide a more cost-effective and less risky method of conducting SEAD. This is especially true since the pilot is not directly at risk and so a commander may be more willing to sacrifice UAVs to accomplish the mission. The first UAVs used in the SEAD role occurred during the Vietnam War, when versions of the Lightning Bug were adapted to carry chaff and other electronic countermeasures. Modern examples of SEAD-specific loitering munitions include the IAI Harpy which loiters over areas with potential SAM activity, searches for SAM activity, and then crashes (with in-built warhead) into the target.

== By country ==
=== Africa ===
==== Algeria ====
- Sukhoi Su-30MKA equipped with Kh-31P anti-radiation missiles.
- Su-24MK2 equipped with Kh-58U and Kh-31P anti-radiation missiles.

==== Egypt ====
- F-16 equipped with AGM-88

==== Morocco ====
- F-16 equipped with AGM-88 (B/C/E variants)

=== America ===
==== Brazil ====
- AMX International equipped with the Brazilian MAR-1 missile

==== United States ====
===== USAF =====
In the US Air Force, the aircraft designed for these missions is known as the "Wild Weasel". It describes aircraft tasked with SEAD missions with anti-radiation missiles. Several platforms have fulfilled this role by the past.

- Wild Weasel I, based on the F-100 Super Sabre The first Wild Weasel squadron ever was the 354th Tactical Fighter Squadron based in Thailand, for missions over North Vietnam.
- Wild Weasel II, based on the F-4C Phantom. This lasted for a very short time as it wasn't a performant platform for this mission.
- Wild Weasel III, based on the F-105F and G (two-seat variant), operational from 1965 to early 1984 It was known as the "Thud" by the crew. It was a well performing variant. It is the first SEAD dedicated platform of the USAF.
- Wild Weasel IV, based on the F-4C Phantom II known as the EF-4C An order for the modification of 36 Phantom II in Wild Weasel IV dedicated variants was made because of the attrition of the F-105 Wild Weasel III.
- Wild Weasel V, based on the F-4E Phantom II, known as the F-4G, operational from 1978 until 1996. 134 F-4E were modified for the SEAD mission.
- Wild Weasel VI, based on the F-16 C/D – Block 50/52, known as the F-16CJ/DJ and operational since 1991, and it remains the dedicated SEAD variant, using the AGM-88 HARM.

===== US Navy =====
- EA-6B Prowler
- F/A-18A/B/C/D Hornet
- F/A-18E/F Super Hornet
- Boeing EA-18G Growler

===== US Marine Corps =====
- F/A-18A/B Hornet
- McDonnell Douglas AV-8B Harrier II

=== Asia ===
==== Australia ====
- Boeing EA-18G Growler equipped with AGM-88 HARM and AGM-88G AARGM-ER missiles

==== Bahrain ====
- F-16 Block 70 equipped with AGM-88F, refurbished from 50 AGM-88B

==== China ====
- Xian JH-7 equipped with YJ-91 anti-radiation missiles
- Chengdu J-10 equipped with YJ-91 anti-radiation missiles
- J-11BS (2-seat variant) equipped with CM-102 anti-radiation missiles

==== Republic of China (Taiwan) ====
- AIDC F-CK-1 Ching-kuo equipped with Sky Sword IIA
- F-16 Fighting Falcon (F-16AM/BM Block 20 and F-16V Block 70) equipped with AGM-88 HARM

==== India ====
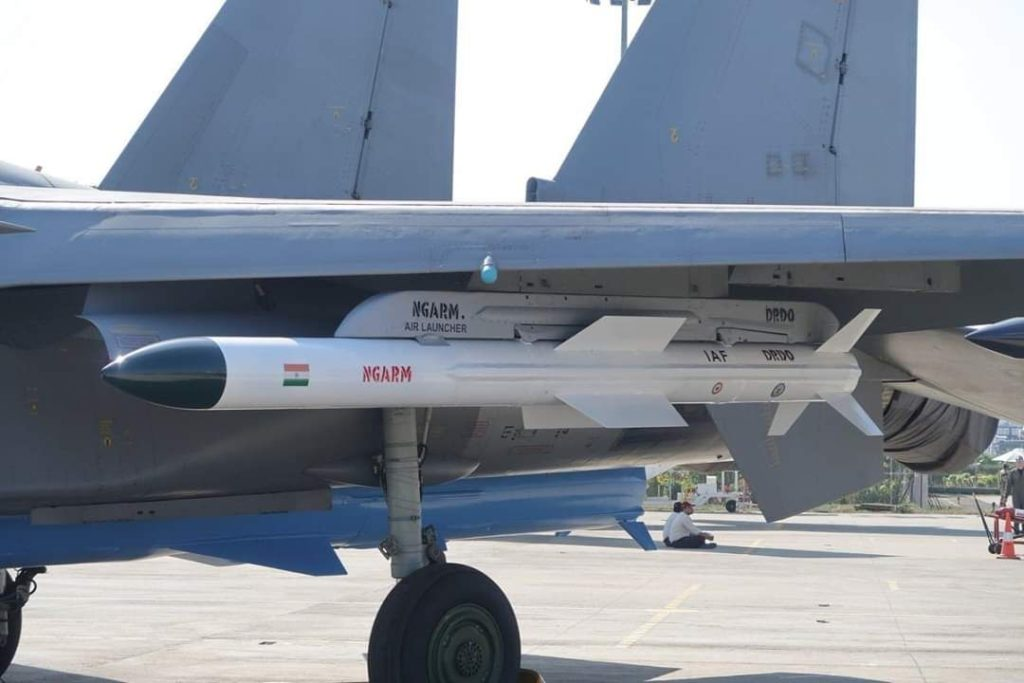
A Rudram missile on an Indian Air Force fighter.

- Su-30MKI equipped with Rudram I, Rudram II and Kh-31P anti-radiation missiles.
- Tejas Mk.1/1A equipped with Rudram I and Kh-31P anti-radiation missiles.
- Dassault Mirage 2000 equipped with Rudram I anti-radiation missiles.
- MiG-29UPG equipped with Rudram I and Kh-31P anti-radiation missiles.

==== Pakistan ====
- JF-17 equipped with MAR-1 missiles, the CM-400AKG, and the LD-10

==== Saudi Arabia ====
- Panavia Tornado equipped with the ALARM missile

==== Vietnam ====
- Su-22M4 equipped with Kh-25MP/MPU anti-radiation missiles.
- Su-30MK2 equipped with Kh-31P anti-radiation missiles.

=== Europe ===
==== Turkey ====
- 151st Squadron "Bronzes" is the sole combatant unit of the Turkish Air Force with SEAD capabilities. The squadron is equipped with AGM-88 HARM anti-radiation missiles. As of 2024, 192 more missiles are on order from the United States.

==== France ====
- No aircraft in the French military is currently equipped with an anti-radiation missile, there is no proper SEAD capable aircraft.
- The Mirage III was equipped with the Martel missile.
- The Mirage F1 was equipped with the Martel missile, but the missile was retired in 1997.

==== Germany ====
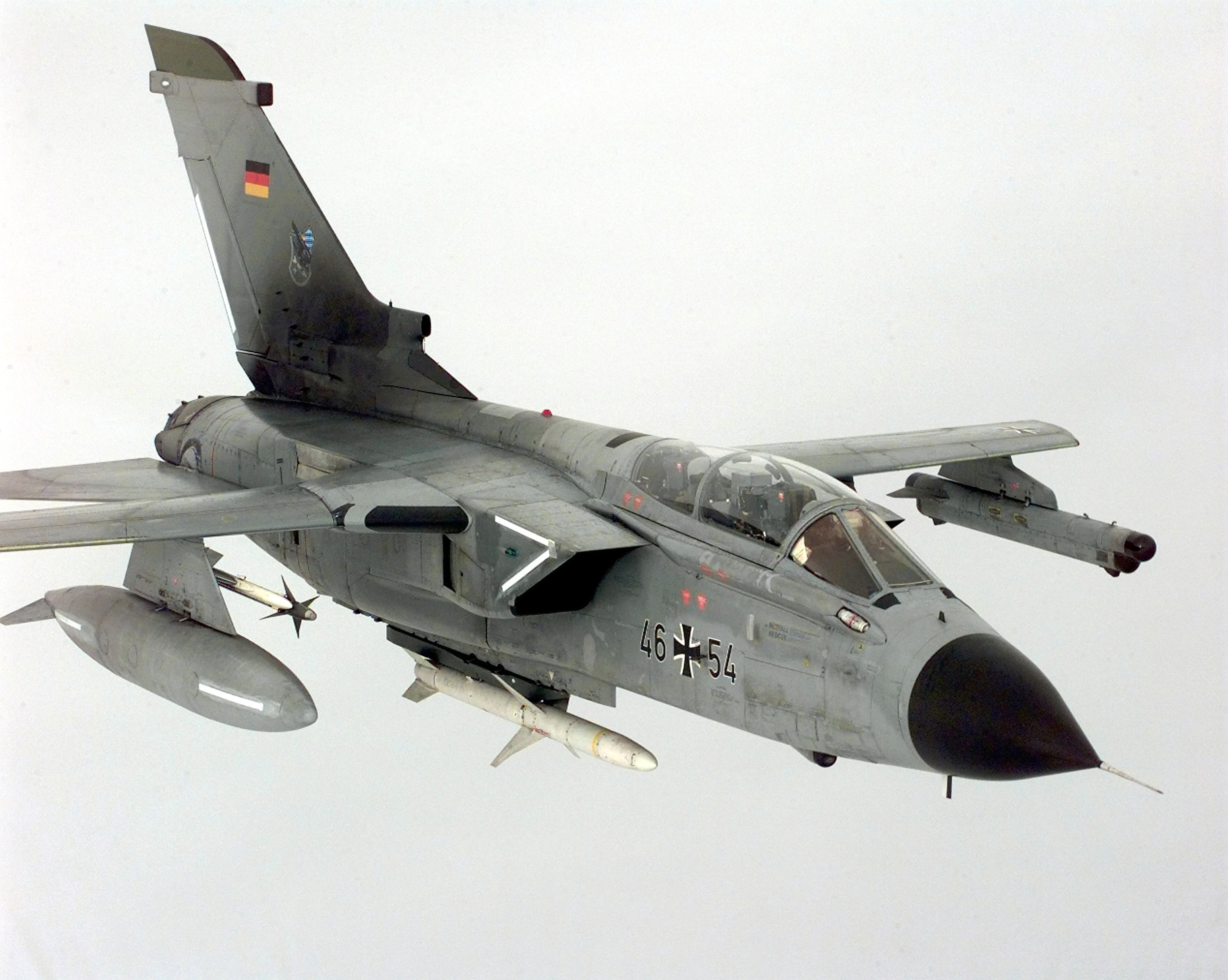
German Luftwaffe Tornado ECR

- Panavia Tornado ECR equipped with AARGM missiles and electronic warfare capabilities, operational since 1990. Germany manufactured 35 new Tornado for this mission
- Eurofighter T2, T3 and T4 equipped with AGM-88E

==== Greece ====
- Older F-16 equipped with AGM-88B Block IIIA and ADM-88E
- Modernised F-16V to be equipped with AARGM that have been ordered

==== Italy ====
- Panavia Tornado ECR equipped with AARGM missiles and electronic warfare capabilities, operational since 1990. Italy modified 16 of its Tornado IDS.

==== Netherlands ====
- F-35A to receive AARGM-ER on order

==== Spain ====
- EF-18 equipped with AGM-88 HARM and currently in use

==== United Kingdom ====
- The former Panavia Tornado GR4 was equipped with the ALARM missile for its SEAD missions.
- The former British Aerospace Sea Harrier was equipped with the AS37 Martel missile.

== Systems in development ==
=== Aircraft ===
- Eurofighter Typhoon ECR: It is the successor of the Panavia Tornado ECR / SEAD for the German Air Force. The program is known in Germany as LUWES ("Luftgestütze Wirkung im Elektromagnetischen Spektrum"). It is planned to reach its IOC by 2029. It is a 2-seat Eurofighter. Airbus Defence is the leading company for the development of the aircraft. In the SEAD/DEAD configuration it is planned to be equipped with:
  - 2 GaN Escort Jammer Pods from Saab, based on the Arexis system, with a 360° coverage
  - Emitter Location System
  - 6 missiles SPEAR EW
  - 4 long-range air-to-air missiles Meteor
  - 2 short range air-to-air missiles IRIS-T
  - 3 fuel tanks
- F-35
  - US Air Force The F-35A will be the future "Wild Weasel" of the Air Force, it will therefore replace the F-16CJ Fighting Falcon. A program for a new missile is ongoing (look at the section "Missiles" below). Some structural modifications were needed to integrate sensors and the new munition planned. Those modifications were applied to the Lots 14 in 15 of F-35 production.
  - British Armed Forces The F-35B will fulfil the SEAD role with the integration of the SPEAR EW missiles as describes below.

=== Missiles ===
- Spear EW
  It is a new missile being developed by MBDA UK designed for SEAD missions. It is targeting integrated ground air defence (static and mobile), as well as the radar systems of ships. It uses next-gen miniature electronic warfare payloads (jammer and decoy). It is based on the SPEAR physical and electrical systems, but the seeker is replaced, the warhead is smaller, it embarks more fuel, and a modular EW payload with loitering capabilities. It will equip the British F-35B, 4 missiles will be able to fit per missile bay, for a total of 8 per aircraft.
- Stand-in Attack Weapon (SiAW) program
  A new program of the US Air Force for a new SEAD / DEAD weapon. Contracts have been issued to fund the initial development with Lockheed Martin, L3 Harris Technologies and Northrop Grumman that are in competition. During the Phase 1, the USAF is aligning the capabilities of the missile systems to the needs of the air force and to the technical requirements of the F-35. The end goal is 3,000 SiAW missiles for US$8.6 billion.
  - Northrop Grumman is offering the AARGM-ER, the latest variant of the AGM-88 HARM that is being developed for the US Navy after having been selected. Its low rate initial production started, and it is being integrated to the F-35C.
  - Lockheed is starting the program from scratch with a new digital design. Lockheed leverages the advanced digital solutions developed by Skunk Works for other programs in this project. The concept is an open, agile, digital weapon.
  - L3 Communications, part of L3 Harris acquired a radar / sensor supplier back in 2017, Mustang Technology Group LP, and with the new consolidated competence center, it is developing its new offer for this program.
- AGM-88G AARGM-ER:
  It is the latest variant of the AGM-88, and is being integrated to the US Navy F/A-18E/F Super Hornet and the EA-18G Growler. The Australian government approved the purchase of 60 missiles for $431 million in August 2023. The Netherlands Air force announced the purchase of the missile in June 2023 for its F-35A.
