= ALARM =

British air-launched anti-radiation missile

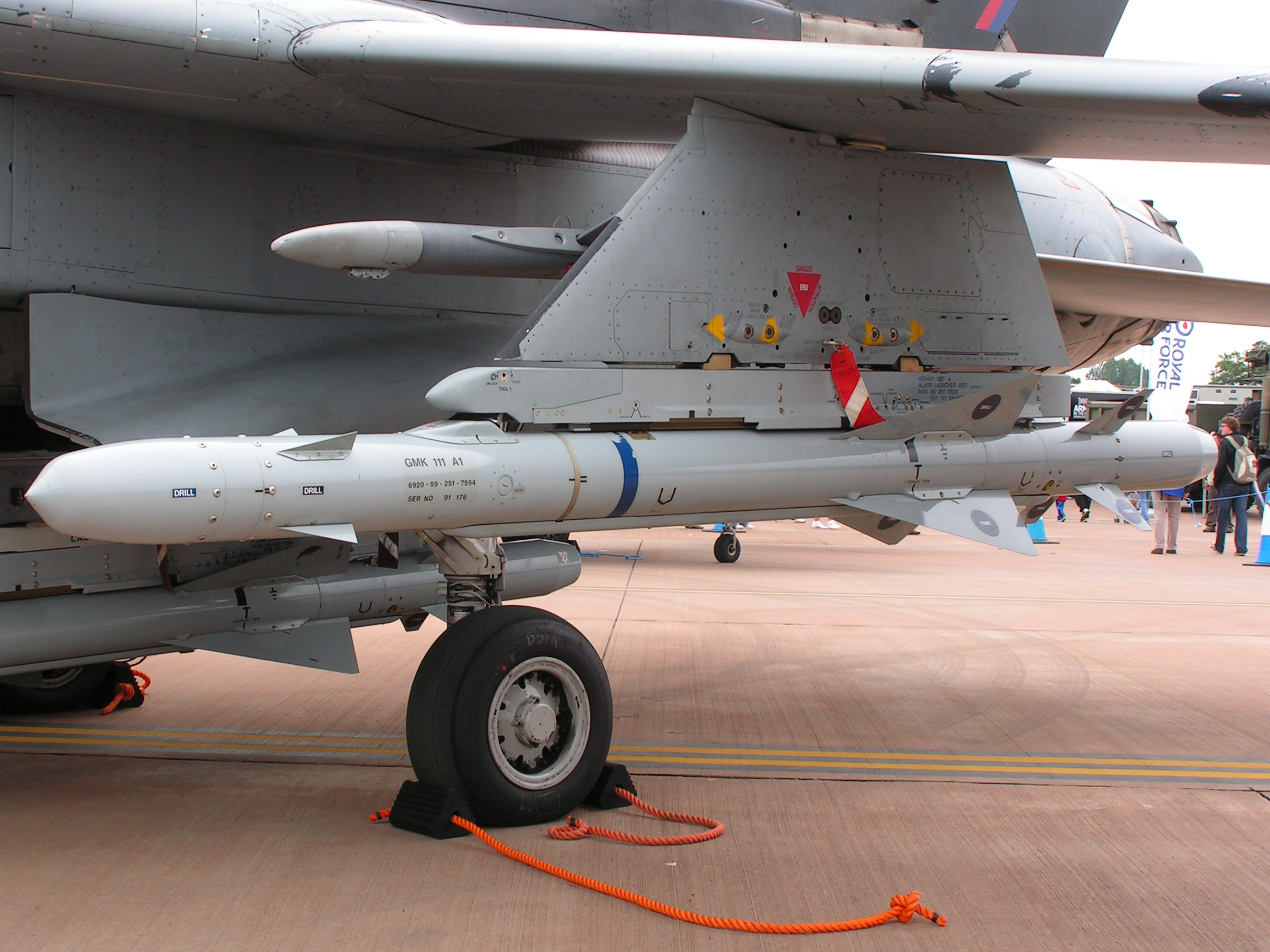
- ALARM under the wing of a RAF Tornado GR4
- Type: Air-to-surface anti-radar missile

Service history
- In service: 1990-2013
- Used by: See operators
- Wars: Gulf War; Kosovo War; Iraq War; Libyan civil war (2011); Yemeni Civil War (2014-present); Saudi Arabian-led intervention in Yemen

Production history
- Designer: BAe Dynamics
- Designed: 1982
- Manufacturer: BAe Dynamics (1982–1999); MBDA UK (since 1999)
- Produced: 1986–1995

Specifications
- Mass: 268 kg (591 lb)
- Length: 4.24 m (13 ft 11 in)
- Diameter: 230 mm (9 in)
- Wingspan: 0.73 m (2 ft 5 in)
- Warhead: Proximity fused high-explosive
- Detonation mechanism: Laser Proximity
- Engine: Bayern Chemie two stage solid-fuel rocket motors
- Propellant: solid-propellant
- Operational range: 93 km (58 mi)
- Maximum speed: 2,455 km/h (1,525 mph) (supersonic)
- Guidance system: Pre-programmed/passive radar seeker
- Launch platform: Tornado GR.4, Tornado F3

ALARM (Air Launched Anti-Radiation Missile) is a British anti-radiation missile designed primarily to destroy enemy radars for the purpose of Suppression of Enemy Air Defenses (SEAD). It was used by the RAF and is still used by the Royal Saudi Air Force. The weapon was retired by the UK at the end of 2013.

== History ==
The Ministry of Defence received offers for a new anti-radiation missile in late 1982; British Aerospace Dynamics offered ALARM while Texas Instruments teamed with Lucas Aerospace offered its HARM missile. Defence Secretary Michael Heseltine announced the selection of ALARM on 29 July 1983. The initial order was 750 missiles for the RAF. The selection process was controversial; the battle between the contractors was bitter, the Ministry of Defence favoured ALARM to retain UK industrial capabilities while the Treasury favoured the cheaper and proven HARM.

In early 1986, BAe recognised that Royal Ordnance was having difficulties delivering the missile's motor, named Nuthatch, and began to consider alternatives. Royal Ordnance's solution to the required burn-loiter-burn characteristic of the engine was complex. In July 1987, BAe, by then the owner of Royal Ordnance, replaced the Nuthatch motor with a lower risk motor designed by Bayern-Chemie. BAe's £200 million contract for the missile was renegotiated with the price increased to £400 million and delivery pushed back from 1988 to 1990. The radar seeker was made by Marconi Space and Defence Systems (GEC) at Stanmore.

The ALARM missile was officially retired by the UK at the end of 2013, but continued to be used by the Saudis.

== Features ==
ALARM is a fire-and-forget system, with an added loiter capability. In loiter mode, ALARM will, when launched, climb to an altitude of 13,000 metres (43,000 ft). If the target radar shuts down, the missile will deploy a parachute and descend slowly until the radar lights up. The missile will then fire a secondary motor to attack the target.

== Combat use ==
ALARM has been used in the following conflicts:

- 1991 Gulf War (Operation Granby), during which 121 missiles were used.
- Kosovo War (Operation Allied Force), during which 6 missiles were used.
- 2003 invasion of Iraq (Operation Telic), during which 47 missiles were used.
- 2011 Libya (Operation Ellamy).
- 2015 Yemen.

== Operators ==
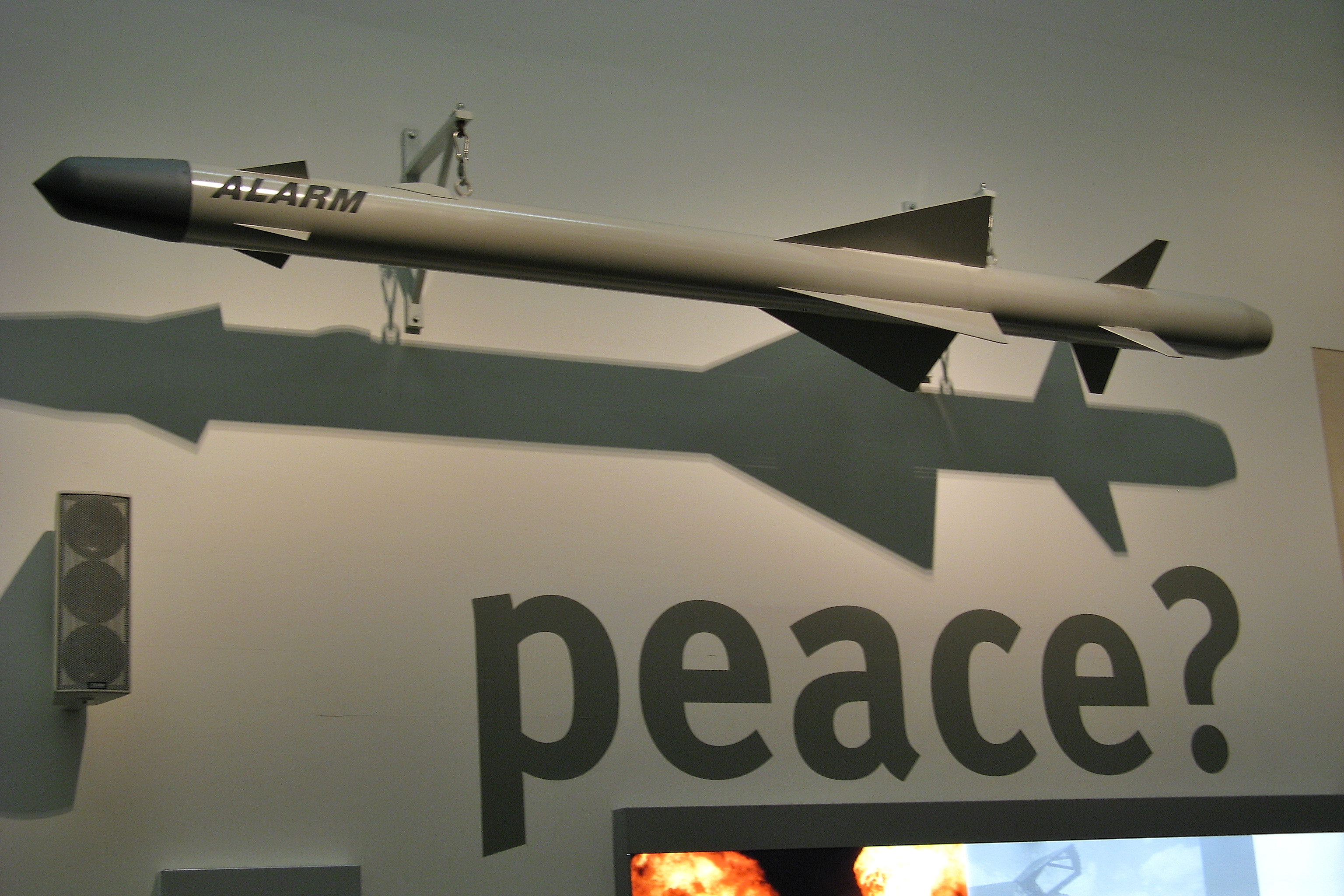
ALARM on display at Imperial War Museum North

=== Current operators ===
Saudi Arabia

- Royal Saudi Air Force

=== Former operators ===
United Kingdom

- Royal Air Force

== Specifications ==
- Primary Function: Suppression of Enemy Air Defence
- Contractor: MBDA
- Power Plant: Bayern Chemie two stage solid propellant rocket motors
- Length: 4.24 m
- Diameter: 23 cm
- Wing Span: 73 cm
- Launch Weight: 268 kg
- Speed: 2455 km/h (supersonic)
- Warhead: Proximity fused high-explosive
- Range: 93 km
- Fuse: Laser Proximity
- Guidance system: Pre-programmed/passive radar seeker
- Unit Cost: undisclosed
- Date Deployed: 1990
- User: UK (RAF)
  - Tornado GR.4
  - Tornado F3: fitted in time for 2003 Gulf War, receiving designation Tornado EF3
  - Weapon has been "fit checked" on other RAF aircraft, such as the Jaguar. Due to its relatively large weight it is not suited to the entire RAF fleet.
  - Also was expected to be usable on the Eurofighter Typhoon, but this requirement was deleted.

== See also ==
- AGM-122 Sidearm – (United States)
- AGM-78 Standard ARM – (United States)
- AGM-88 HARM – (United States)
- AGM-45 Shrike – (United States)
- ARMAT – (France)
- Kh-28 – (Soviet Union)
- Kh-31 – (Soviet Union)
- Kh-58 – (Soviet Union)
- LD-10 – (China)
- MAR-1 – (Brazil)
- Martel – (United Kingdom, France)
- Rudram-1 – (India)
- YJ-91 – (China)
