= Brazo =

- Brazo/PAVE ARM missile
- Type: Anti-radiation missile
- Place of origin: United States

Service history
- Used by: United States Air Force; United States Navy

Production history
- Designed: 1972-1973
- Manufacturer: Hughes Aircraft

Specifications
- Length: 12.0 feet (3.66 m)
- Diameter: 8 inches (200 mm)
- Wingspan: 3.3 feet (1.02 m)
- Warhead: Continuous rod
- Warhead weight: 65 pounds (29 kg)
- Engine: Rocketdyne Mk 38
- Propellant: Solid fuel
- Operational range: 16 nautical miles (30 km; 18 mi)
- Maximum speed: Mach 4
- Guidance system: Passive radar homing
- Launch platform: F-4D Phantom II

The Brazo (/ˈbrɑːsoʊ/) missile was an American project of the 1970s, intended to produce an anti-radiation missile for air-to-air use. Developed by Hughes Aircraft and based on the AIM-7 Sparrow air-to-air missile, the Brazo underwent a series of successful test firings; however, the program was terminated at the end of its test program.

== Design and development ==
A joint development project between Hughes Aircraft and the United States Navy, the Brazo missile (named as a pun by one of the project's Navy developers, a Hispanic; "Brazo" is Spanish for "Arm", the acronym for an Anti-Radiation Missile) project was initiated in 1972, as a proof-of-concept demonstration of the utility of an air-to-air, anti-radar missile. In 1973, the United States Air Force's Pave Arm project, a program with similar goals, was merged into the Brazo program, with the Air Force assuming responsibility for testing the missile.

The first air-to-air anti-radiation missile developed by the United States, the Brazo utilised the airframe of the existing AIM-7E Sparrow air-to-air missile, fitted with a new, Hughes-built passive radar seeker head developed by the Naval Electronics Center. The seeker was intended to detect and home on enemy radar emissions, such as those on interceptor and AWACS aircraft.

== Operational history ==
The first test firing of the Brazo missile was conducted in April 1974, with the missile, launched from a USAF F-4D Phantom II, successfully shooting down a BQM-34 Firebee drone; four follow-up tests over the following year continued the missile's successful record, with none of the test shots failing despite difficult test conditions. However, despite the Brazo's success, the follow-on ERASE (Electro-magnetic RAdiation Source Elimination) project was cancelled, and no air-to-air antiradiation missiles would enter service in the West.

== See also ==
- R-27 (air-to-air missile) – (Soviet Union)
