= Rudram (missile) =

Indian anti-radiation, air to surface missile system

Rudram-1 (NGARM)
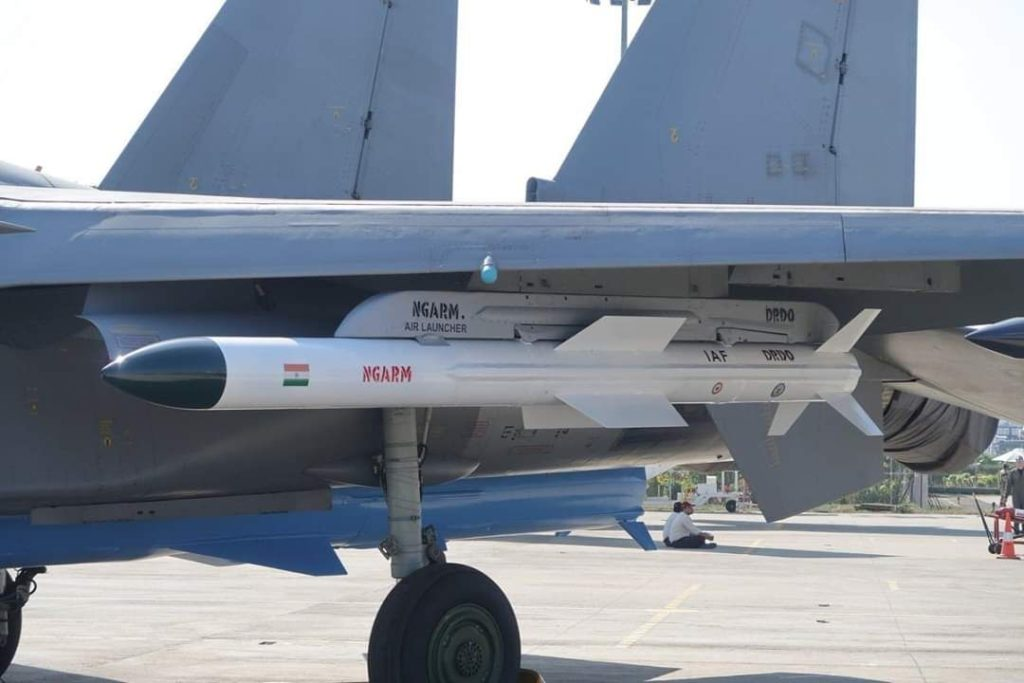
- DRDO Rudram-1 on a Su-30MKI
- Type: Air-to-surface anti-radiation missile
- Place of origin: India

Service history
- In service: Rudram-1: 2022 to present
- Used by: Indian Air Force

Production history
- Designer: Defence Research and Development Laboratory
- Designed: 2012–present
- Manufacturer: Adani Defence & Aerospace
- Produced: Under Development
- Variants: See Specifications

Specifications
- Accuracy: ≤ 5 m CEP
- Launch platform: MiG-29UPG; Dassault Mirage 2000; Su-30MKI; Tejas Mk.1/1A; HAL Tejas Mk2 (Planned); AMCA (Planned); TEDBF (Planned)

The Rudram (lit. 'Roaring') is a series of supersonic and hypersonic air-to-surface (ASM) ground attack and anti-radiation missiles in development by the Defence Research and Development Organisation of India. It can be launched from a range of altitudes with large standoff distance for destroying enemy surveillance radars, communication stations and bunkers.

It will be manufactured jointly by Bharat Dynamics Limited and Bharat Electronics Limited after trials and introduction. DRDO also involved Adani Defence & Aerospace under Development cum Production Partner programme for mass production. The hypersonic variant Rudram-2 will also be manufactured by Adani Defence and Aerospace in their Hyderabad facility.

== Description ==
Defence Research and Development Laboratory is the primary agency which carried out the design and development of the missile system along with Armament Research and Development Establishment, Defence Electronics Research Laboratory, High Energy Materials Research Laboratory, Research Centre Imarat and Terminal Ballistics Research Laboratory. Many subsystem level developmental works were outsourced to private sector players. Software Development Institute of the Indian Air Force (IAF) helped in the integration of DRDO ARM with Sukhoi Su-30MKI while the Hindustan Aeronautics Limited (HAL), Nasik Division did the AKU-58 launcher modification which undertook extensive wind-tunnel tests at National Trisonic Aerodynamic Facilities division of National Aerospace Laboratories, Bengaluru.

DRDO ARM, now Rudram 1, has a range of 100–250 km which is made to be integrated with Sukhoi Su-30MKI as its primary test platform, although can be used with Dassault Mirage 2000, SEPECAT Jaguar, HAL Tejas and HAL Tejas Mark 2 in future. According to the then Director of Research Centre Imarat, G. Satheesh Reddy, the missile will feature a millimetre wave seeker (mmW) transmitting on frequencies of 30 gigahertz and above while capable of lock-on before launch and lock-on after launch modes. Mid-course guidance is accomplished through inertial navigation system and two-way datalink combined with Global Positioning System/NavIC satellite guidance through digital filtering as fall back to correct accumulated errors and a passive homing head (PHH) seeker which is developed by Defence Electronics Research Laboratory that can detect radio frequency emissions from 100 km away. PHH is a wide-band receiver system operating within D band to J band frequency of the electromagnetic spectrum. Its compact front-end structure is due to the use of monolithic microwave integrated circuit (MMIC) technology for identification of radiation emitting sources.

The missile is a single-stage, approximately 5.5-metre in length and 600 kg of weight with cruciform wing surface to increase high maneuverability and to give constant aerodynamic characteristics similar to Astra beyond-visual-range missile. It uses pre-fragmented warhead with optical proximity fuze and is powered by a dual-pulsed solid rocket motor made by Premier Explosives Limited under technology transfer from DRDO. The dual-pulsed solid rocket motor produces variable thrust within a range of Mach 0.6 to 2 that reduces the overall reaction time while widening the targeting envelope as well as the engagement capability. DRDO ARM can target mobile integrated air-defence system as well as radar station that shutdown to avoid detection.

== Development ==
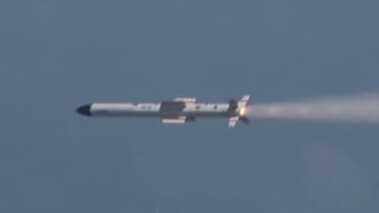
Rudram-1 in flight

Development had begun by April 2012 at Defence Research and Development Laboratory. The project was officially approved in December 2012 with a budget of ₹317.2 crore (equivalent to ₹653 crore or US$68 million in 2026) with project completion by 2017. The feasibility studies were done in 2012–2013 with the aim is to develop a fully indigenous tactical, anti-radiation capable missile for the Indian Air force (IAF) which is comparable to AGM-88E AARGM, MAR-1, Kh-31P and better than Martel or Kh-25MP.

From 2014, the development of missile picked up interest of the IAF. In 2014, missile design and hardware development were in progress with first flight trial expected before 2017. IAF was initially very concerned with the higher weight and shorter range of new missile compare to the western ones due to the use of bulky Russian made radio frequency (RF) seekers. IAF at the same time was also negotiating with USA for 1,500 AGM-88E which IAF was planning to induct in the next five years. The technologies that were developed by DRDO for NGARM are wide-band passive seeker, milli-metric wave active seeker, radome for the seekers and dual-pulsed propulsion system which are mostly lessons learnt during the development of Astra and Barak 8.

== Trials ==
=== Rudram-1 ===
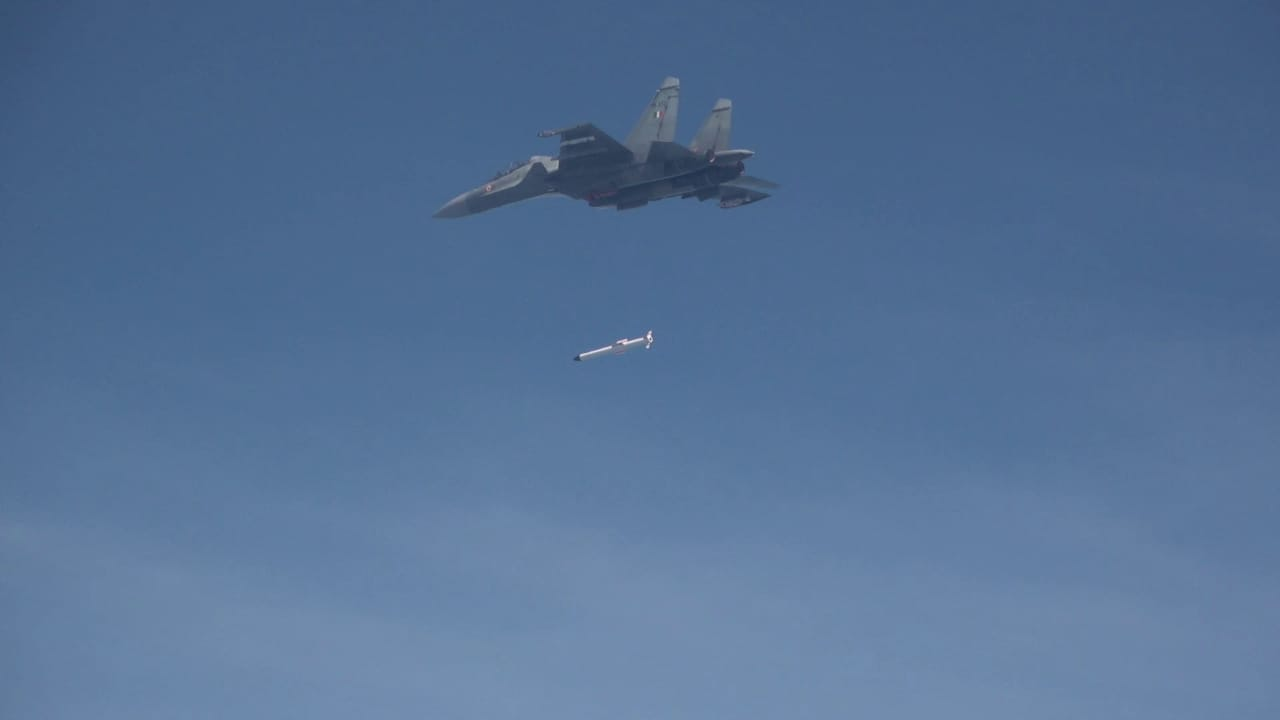
Su-30 MKI launching Rudram-1

The Captive Flight Trial–1 of DRDO ARM was completed in April/May 2016 by No. 20 Squadron of IAF which checked the performance of seeker, navigation and control system, structural capability and aerodynamic vibrations while the Drop Flight Trial was completed by December 2016 with the missile released by Sukhoi Su-30MKI at a speed of 0.8 Mach, from 6.5 km altitude. Further carriage flight test was carried out to check mechanical/electrical integration as well as software interfacing of the missile before the maiden flight on 18 January 2018, where the missile was successfully flight tested for the first time on parametres such as auto-launch sequence, store separation, control guidance, aerodynamics, thermal batteries, airframe and propulsion without a seeker which were all proven successful. On 25 January 2019, NGARM was fired from a Sukhoi Su-30MKI over Bay of Bengal off the coast of Odisha that hit the designated target with a high degree of accuracy. The missile achieved an accuracy within 10 m CEP covering a range of 100 km. The developmental test proved the performance of seeker, structural integrity of the missile, correct functioning of navigation and control system while validation of aerodynamic capability. The missile can strike at distances double the intended range depending upon the altitude. NGARM will further undergo series of carriage and release flight trials to check the performance of seekers against a different range of targets.

Next trials during the period of July to August 2019 will be conducted initially to check the performance of indigenous passive seeker developed by Defence Electronics Research Laboratory with further test for an active seeker at later stage. While the crucial sensor technology is yet to be fully mastered by DRDO, the IAF wants fast track development of NGARM due to urgent requirement of newer anti-radiation missile. NGARM developmental trials will resume from 2020 after a gap of two years.

The DRDO Anti-Radiation Missile or NGARM now officially named Rudram-1 was successfully test-fired from Integrated Test Range, Balasore on 9 October 2020. DRDO is planning final test flight between 28 and 29 December 2021 before moving Rudram-1 for serial production from 2022.

In 2023, report suggested that the missile is ready for user trials. In July 2024, reports emerged about another successful flight test of Rudram-1 missile. The missile's Passive Homing Head (PHH) was successfully testes against a S-band target on 20 November 2025 at the Chandhan Range in the Jaisalmer district, Rajasthan. This marked the final developmental trial of the weapon system.

=== Rudram-2 ===
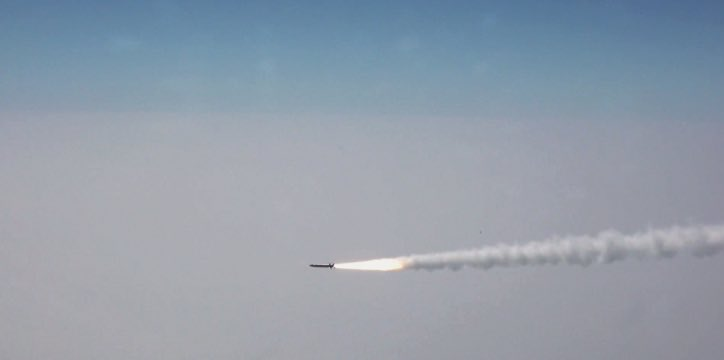
Rudram-2 test fired

The release flight trial was conducted in 2022 from Sukhoi Su-30MKI. The first test of the anti radiation of the RudraM-II was reported in July 2023. It has a range of 300 km and has an additional Imaging Infrared (IIR) seeker. The missile can be fired from Sukhoi Su-30MKI and Mirage 2000.

The RudraM-II missile was successfully flight-tested from a Sukhoi-30MKI fighter off the coast of Odisha on 29 May 2024. The propulsion system and control & guiding algorithm were validated by the test. It will replace Kh-31s in IAF inventory. The missile can be launched from a range of altitudes and can identify signals from radars and enemy radio frequencies at ranges more than 100 km. It has Lock-On-Before/After-Launch systems installed, which allow for flexible targeting. The missile also has an internal guidance system that allows it to find its way to the target on its own after launch.

The flight trials of RudraM-II missiles were conducted successfully from a Sukhoi-30MKI fighter off the coast of Odisha on 2 June 2026. The tests were conducted under extreme release conditions with critical flight trajectory to validate all the subsystems. The target was pre-defined and struck with high accuracy. Flight data captured via instruments deployed at the Integrated Test Range confirmed all test objectives were met. At least three flight trials of the missile has been conducted with the one in May 2024 being the first full-configuration trial.

=== Rudram-3 ===
Two Rudram-3 missiles fitted on a modified Su-30MKI were successfully used in release trials by DRDO and IAF in July 2025. In addition to ensuring electrical interface compatibility through MIL-STD-1553B data bus, mission computer, and display processors in accordance with the electrical interface control document specified by Research Center Imarat, the modification includes modifications to weapon stations and a specially designed bomb rack made to carry Rudram-3.

DRDO successfully tested Rudram-3 in captive flight on Su-30MKI in March 2026. The technical team was able to assess the system's structural limitations, airflow dynamics, and electronic compatibility without carrying out a real launch. The missile maintained total structural soundness over a broad range of operational altitudes, velocities, and aerial maneuvers.

== Order and induction ==
It has been reported that after six to seven additional tests, Rudram-1 will be inducted in the Indian Air Force by 2022. The missile's passive homing head can detect, classify and engage targets over a wide band of frequencies as programmed.

The Indian Air Force submitted a proposal to the Ministry of Defence in November 2022 to buy Rudram-1 missiles for ₹1,400 crore (equivalent to ₹16 billion or US$170 million in 2026). The Defence Acquisition Council (DAC) granted Rudram-1 the Acceptance of Necessity (AoN) on 22 December 2022.

== Future development ==
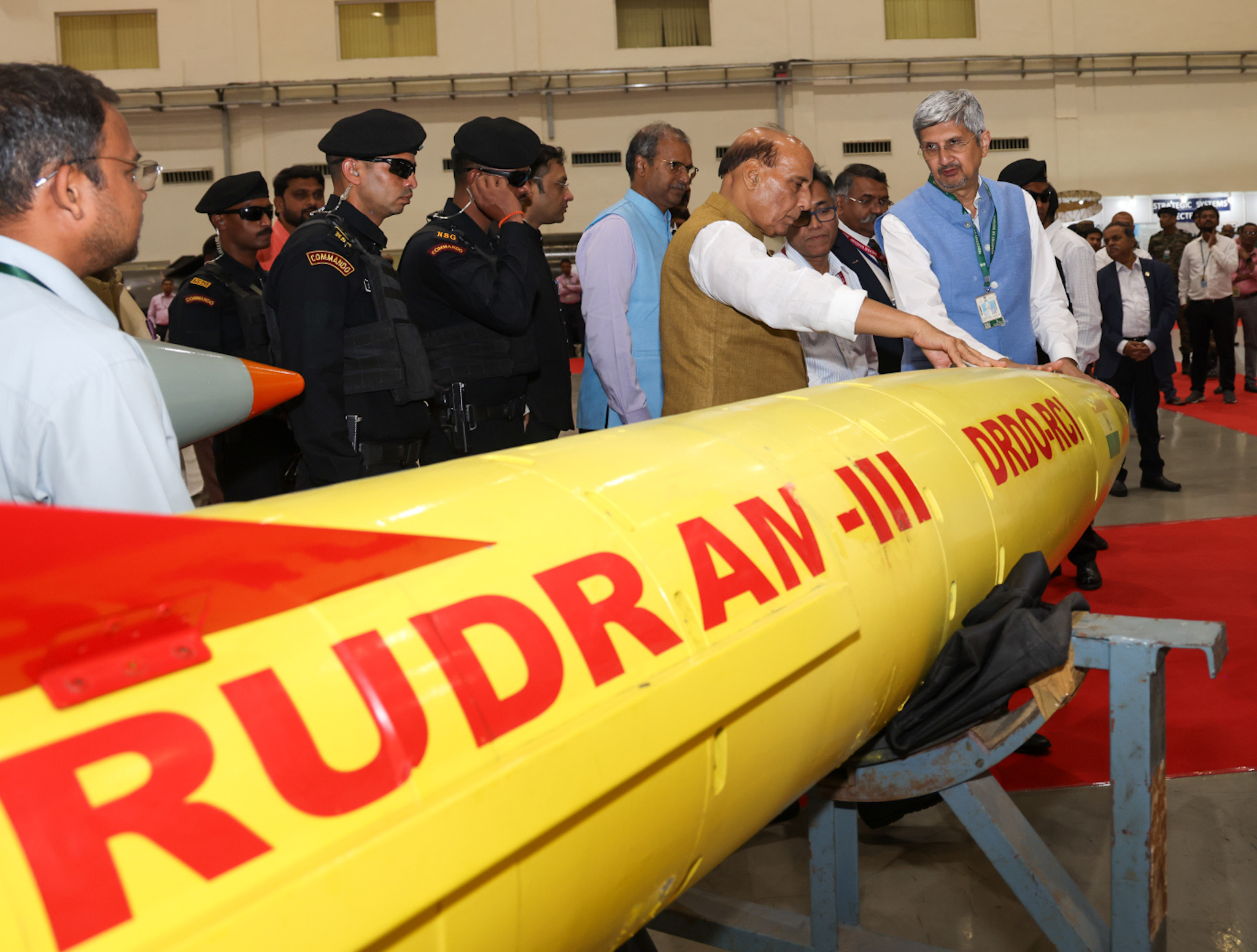
Rudram-3 being inspected by Defense Minister Rajnath Singh

=== Rudram-3 ===
DRDO is planning to bring further software improvements to handle a larger variety of targets under various operational conditions while developing a separate ground-based variant to be launched from mobile launcher. DRDO is developing Rudram-2 with a range of 350 km and air to ground version Rudram-3 with 550 km range. A number of Rudram-3 subsystems have been built by 2023. Aircraft adaption tests for electrical and mechanical systems were finished.

=== Rudram-4 (LRSOW) ===
As per DRDO Chief Samir V. Kamat, Rudram-4 will be a lightweight, long-range standoff weapon (LRSOW) for increased operational flexibility. It will integrate with Dassault Mirage 2000, Sukhoi Su-30 MKI, and Dassault Rafale with speed exceeding Mach 5. In 2023, the Defense Acquisition Council authorized the acceptance of necessity for Rudram-4. It will use inertial and satellite navigation with imaging infrared or passive homing head for precision strikes against command centers, radar sites, and hardened bunkers. Rudram-4 will have 1,000–1,500 km range. It will use maneuverable flight routes at low altitudes to evade air defense systems.

== Specifications ==
Variants	Rudram-1	Rudram-2		Rudram-3	Rudram-4 (LRSOW)
Variants	Rudram-1	Anti-radiation	Ground attack	Rudram-3	Rudram-4 (LRSOW)
Range	150–200 km (93–124 mi)	300–350 km (190–220 mi)		550–600 km (340–370 mi)	300–1,500 km (190–930 mi)
Weight	600 kg (1,300 lb)	1,025 kg (2,260 lb)		1,600 kg (3,500 lb)	
Length	5.2 m	~6 m		6 m	Unknown
Warhead	Pre-fragmented		PCB		
Warhead weight	55–60 kg (121–132 lb)	155 kg (342 lb)	200 kg (440 lb)	200–500 kg (440–1,100 lb)	1,000 kg (2,200 lb)
Detonation mechanism	Optical proximity fuze	Unknown		Unknown	
Engine	Dual-pulsed rocket motor	Unknown		Two-stage rocket motor	Solid booster + ramjet/scramjet
Propellant	Solid fuel				
Flight altitude	500 metres (0.31 mi) - 15 km (9.3 mi)	3–40 km (1.9–24.9 mi)		11 km (6.8 mi)	Unknown
Maximum speed	Mach 2	Mach 5.5		>Mach 5	
Guidance	Mid-course: INS + GNSS + 2-way datalink Terminal: PHH + MMW ARH	Mid-course: INS + GNSS Terminal: PHH + IIR	Mid-course: INS + GNSS Terminal: IIR	Unknown	Mid-course: INS + GNSS Terminal: PHH + IIR
Status	Under trials.			Under development.	

== See also ==
- Hormoz-2 – (Iran)
- AGM-88 HARM – (United States)
- ALARM missile – (United Kingdom)
- Kh-31 – (Soviet Union)
- MAR-1 – (Brazil)
- YJ-91 – (China)
