= Anti-radiation missile =

Missile designed to detect and home on an enemy radio emission source

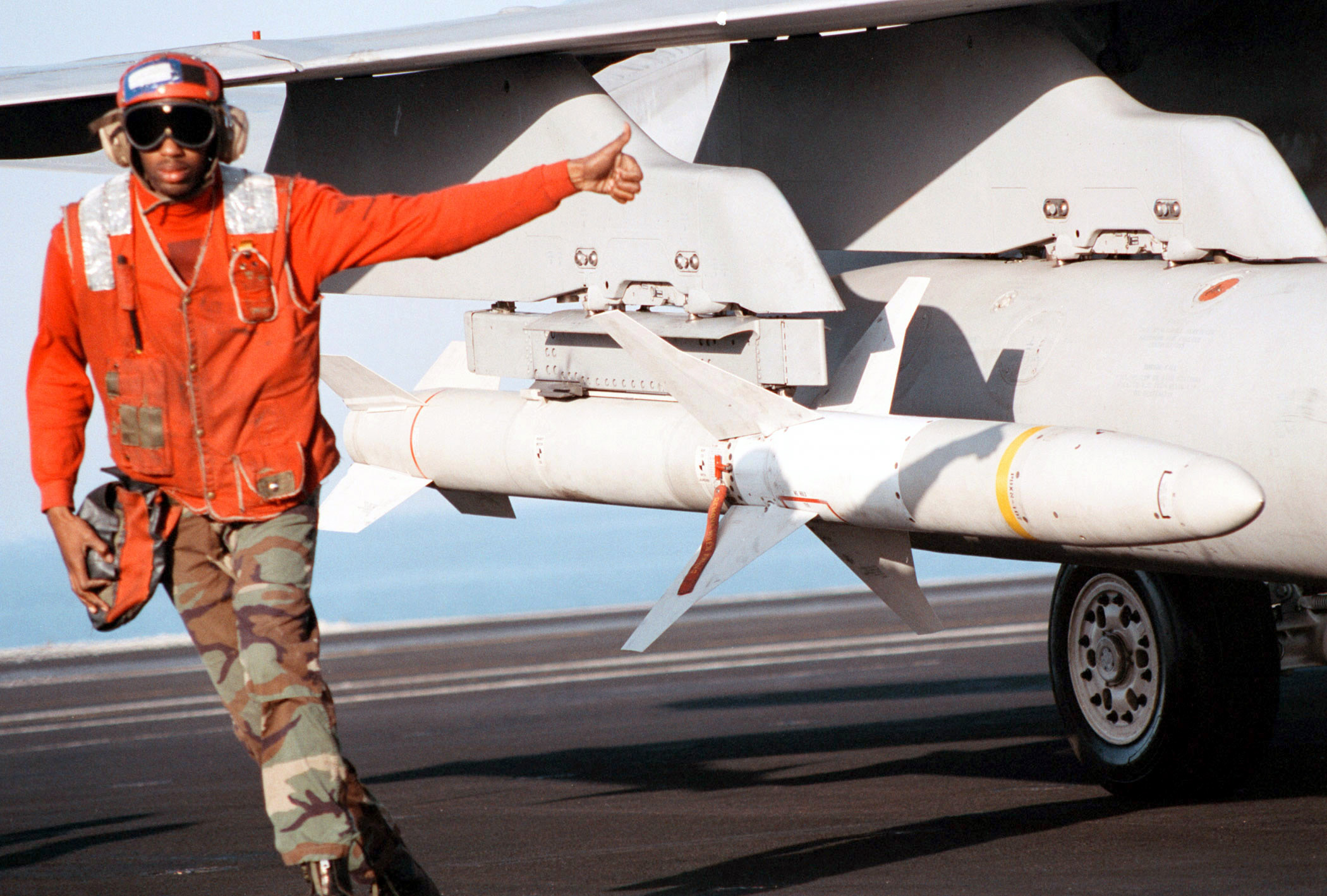
HARM on a US Navy F/A-18C

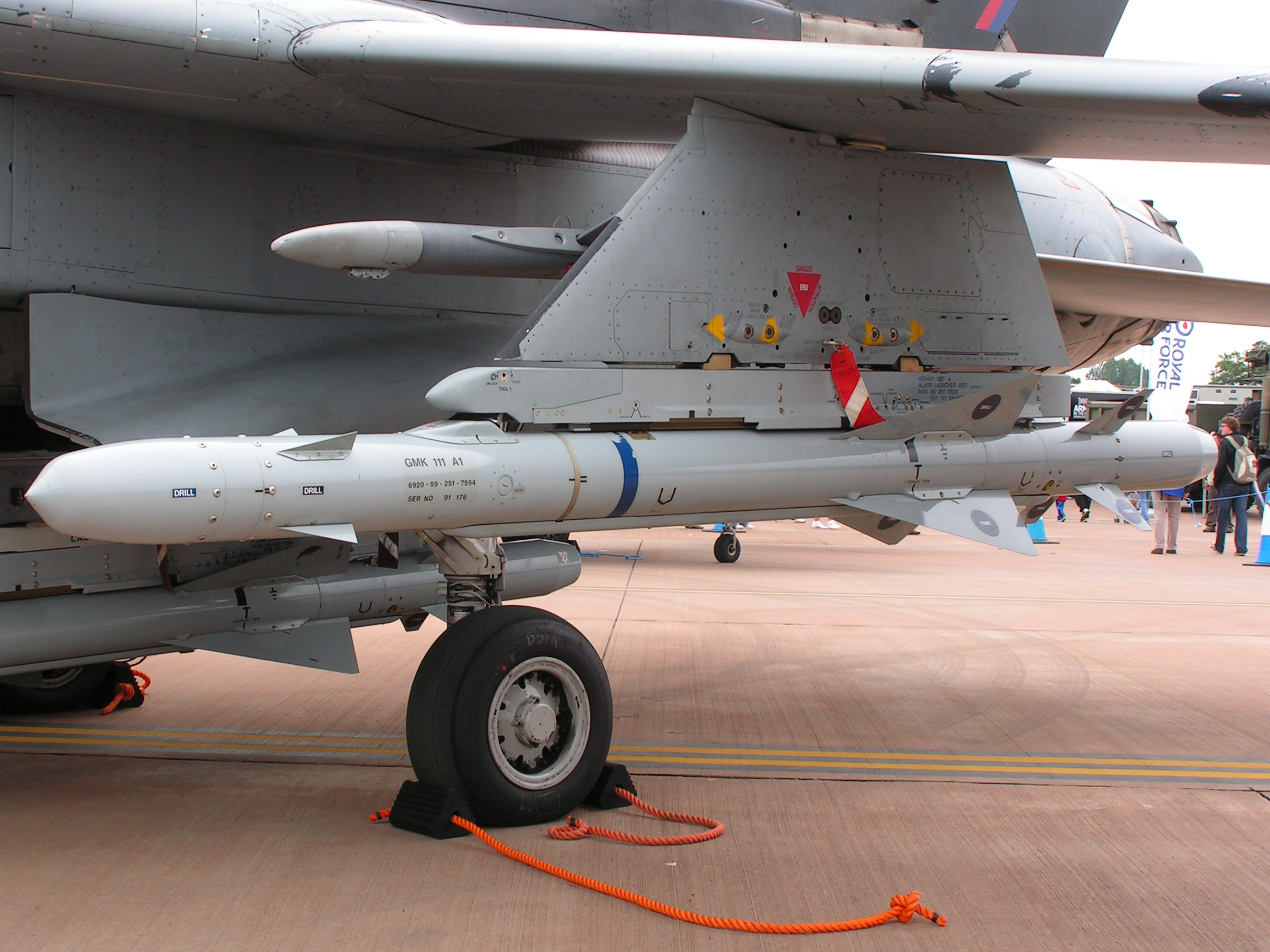
ALARM under the wing of a Tornado

An anti-radiation missile (ARM) is a missile designed to detect and home in on an enemy radio emission source. Typically, these are designed for use against an enemy radar, although jammers and even radios used for communications can also be targeted in this manner.

The earliest known anti-radiation weapon is a variant of the Blohm & Voss BV 246 radar guided bomb.

== Home-on-jam ==
As jammers proliferated, a number of existing ARMs such as the AGM-88 HARM was modified to also target jammers as the source of radiation. Jammers also led to the addition of a home-on-jam feature to missiles that usually use a different targeting mode (e.g. active radar homing, semi-active radar homing, GPS), allowing them to switch to an anti-radiation targeting mode when radar deteriorates too much. Some examples are:

- JDAM and JDAM-ER, air-to-surface GPS bomb
- AMRAAM, active radar homing air-to-air missile
- R-77, active radar homing air-to-air missile

Unlike radar, anti-radiation guidance does not provide range information.

== Air-to-surface ==
Most ARM designs to date have been intended for use against ground-based radars. Commonly carried by specialist aircraft in the Suppression of Enemy Air Defenses (SEAD) role (known to United States Air Force as "Wild Weasels"), the primary purpose of this type of missile is to degrade enemy air defenses in the first period of a conflict in order to increase the chance of survival for the following waves of strike aircraft. They can also be used to quickly shut down unexpected surface-to-air missile (SAM) sites during an air raid. Often, SEAD escort aircraft also carry cluster bombs, which can be used to ensure that, after the ARM disables the SAM system's radar, the command post, missile launchers, and other components or equipment are also destroyed to guarantee that the SAM site stays down.

Early ARMs, such as the AGM-45 Shrike, were not particularly intelligent; they would simply home in on the source of radiation and explode when they got near it. SAM operators learned to turn their radar off when an ARM was fired at them, then turn it back on later, greatly reducing the missile's effectiveness. This led to the development of more advanced ARMs such as the AGM-78 Standard ARM, AGM-122 Sidearm, and AGM-88 HARM missiles, which have inertial guidance systems (INS) built-in. This allows them to remember the radar's direction if it is turned off and continue to fly towards it. ARMs are less likely to hit the radar if the radar is turned off shortly after the missile is launched, as the longer the radar is off (and assuming it never turns back on), the more error is introduced into the missile's course. The ALARM has an added loiter mode, with a built-in parachute, enabling it to descend slowly until the radar activates, whereupon the rocket motor will re-ignite. Even a temporary shut down of the enemy's missile guidance radar can be of a great advantage to friendly aircraft during battle. (Note: Generally, the scope of time for this sanctuary can be measured in seconds or minutes (at best).)

== Surface-to-surface ==
Several surface-to-surface missiles, like the P-700 Granit, P-500 Bazalt, MM40 Exocet, B-611MR, and Otomat, include a capability wherein the receiver component of their active radar homing is used to home in on enemy radar, ECM or communications. This makes these missiles significantly harder to defeat with ECM and distraction countermeasures, and makes the use of semi-active missiles against them dangerous. Surface launched anti-radiation missiles also found application in the Israeli defense forces, such as a variant of the AGM-45 Shrike which could be fitted on an M4 Sherman tank chassis.

== Surface-to-air ==
Due to experiences with jamming by US-built aircraft in Vietnam and during Middle Eastern wars in the late 1960s, the Soviet Union designed an alternative tracking mode for their S-75 (SA-2) missiles, which allowed them to track a jamming target without needing to actively send out any radar signals. This was achieved by the SAM site's radar receiver locking on to radio noise emissions generated by an aircraft's jamming pod. In cases of heavy jamming, missiles were often launched exclusively in this mode; this passive tracking meant that SAM sites could track targets without needing to emit any radar signals, and so American anti-radiation missiles could not be fired back in retaliation. Recently, the People's Republic of China developed the FT-2000 system to counter AEW and AWACS targets. This system is based on the HQ-9, which is in turn based on the S-300PMU. These anti-radiation missile systems have been marketed to Pakistan and various other countries.

== Air-to-air ==
More recently, air-to-air ARM designs have begun to appear, notably the Russian Vympel R-27EP. Such missiles have several advantages over other missile guidance techniques: they do not trigger radar warning receivers (conferring a measure of surprise) and they can have a longer range.

In the 1970s, Hughes Aerospace had a project called BRAZO (Spanish for arm). Based on a Raytheon AIM-7 Sparrow, it was meant to offer an air-to-air capability against proposed Soviet AWACS types and also some other types with extremely powerful radar sets, such as the MiG-25. The project did not proceed.

== See also ==
- AGM-88 HARM – U.S. high-speed air-to-surface anti-radiation missile
- AKBABA – Turkish air-to-surface anti-radiation missile currently developed by ROKETSAN
- ALARM – British air-launched anti-radiation missile
- CM-400AKG - Chinese air to surface anti-radiation missile
- Rudram – Indian anti-radiation, air to surface missile system
- Hormoz-2
- Kh-31 – Soviet/Russian air-to-surface missile
- Kh-58
- MAR-1 – Brazilian anti-radiation missile
- Stand-in Attack Weapon
- TC-2A – Taiwanese beyond-visual-range air-to-air missile with active radar homing
- YJ-91 – Chinese anti-radiation/anti-ship missile
