= MAR-1 =

Brazilian anti-radiation missile

- Type: Air-to-surface anti-radiation missile
- Place of origin: Brazil

Service history
- In service: Active
- Used by: Brazil and Pakistan

Production history
- Manufacturer: Mectron
- Produced: 2012

Specifications
- Mass: 586.4 pounds (266.0 kg) or 350 kg (770 lb)
- Length: 12.7 feet (3.9 m)
- Diameter: 9.1 inches (23 cm)
- Warhead: High-explosive
- Warhead weight: 90 kilograms (200 lb)
- Detonation mechanism: Laser/contact proximity fuse
- Engine: Rocket motor
- Operational range: 60 to 100km
- Guidance system: Passive radar homing, home-on-jam, 800 MHz to 20 GHz
- Launch platform: Surface-Launched and Air-Launched: A-1M; F-5M; Mirage III (Project ROSE); Mirage V (Project ROSE); JF-17 Thunder

The MAR-1 is an air-to-surface (ASM) and surface-to-surface (SSM) anti-radiation missile (ARM) with GPS/INS capability under development by Brazil's Mectron and the Aerospace Technology and Science Department (Departamento de Ciência e Tecnologia Aeroespacial, DCTA) of the Brazilian Air Force. It is designed to suppress enemy air defenses (SEAD) by targeting surveillance radars and fire-control radars.

== Development and design ==
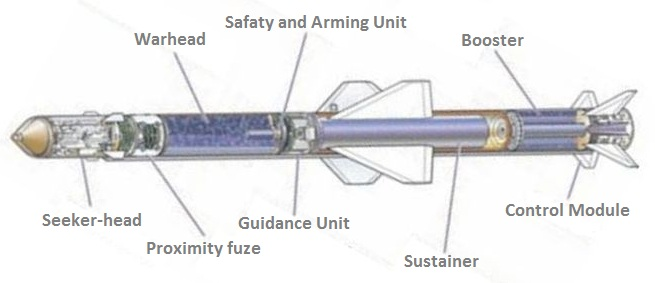
MAR-1 Modules

Development began in 1997 and was kept under tight secrecy, and for many years the weapon's manufacturers refused to acknowledge its existence.

The program was conducted since the beginning by DCTA (Aerospace Technology and Science Department), along with Mectron, a São José dos Campos based company, and is currently in final testing phase. According to FAB, the test campaign is now in the weapons separation trials phase, using A-1B aircraft from IPTV (Instituto de Pesquisa e Teste de Voo - Research and Flight Test Institute), a division of DCTA.

Captive and certification flight tests were performed in December 2008, in order to evaluate the fiber optic gyroscope (FOG) module. This module, consisting of three interferometric fiber optic gyroscopes, is part of the Inertial Measurement Unit (IMU), and was developed indigenously by the Institute for Advanced Studies (Instituto de Estudos Avançados, IEAv). The missile proximity fuse is provided by the Brazilian firm Opto Eletronica.

The missile is guided by a locally developed passive anti-radiation seeker, designed to target different types of land-based and sea-based radars operating in different bands, including high power surveillance radars, low power mobile radars and tracking radars used by surface-to-air missile systems. Enemy radars can be targeted by the missile independently or with targeting data from the launch aircraft's electronic warfare systems, such as the radar warning receiver. The missile has full ECCM capability, and uses passive guidance in self-defense (reactive) mode, or pre-programmed target mode, used primarily for area suppression or attacking expected targets. In order to improve survivability, the missile's airframe is built with composite materials that reduce its radar cross-section.

The greatest difficulty during development was designing the gyroscopic platform (a navigation system that "flies" the missile while it searches for targets during flight). Such technology is earmarked for embargo, due to political and strategic considerations, and could not be obtained from other parties. This resulted in the development of a Miniature Fiber-Optic Gyroscope, with three orthogonal axes, to provide the necessary information for on-board computers and ensuring missile accuracy. The design of this subsystem was conducted by IEAv (Institute of Advanced Studies of DCTA) and Mectron.

Another obstacle arose in 1999, when Brazil tried to purchase spiral antennas and some other systems for MAR-1's search head development from a Las Vegas manufacturer. The U.S. government blocked the sale, claiming that "it is not America's interest to introduce anti-radiation weapons in the region". Faced with this obstacle, the DCTA had no alternative but to locally develop a seeker head. This subsystem was developed and tested with simulated emissions from a TS-100 + Systems Excalibur (0.5 to 18 GHz) and HS-125 aircraft from CTA's flight test division, as well as EMB-110 "Bandeirulha" patrol aircraft equipped with electronic test gear.

Analysis of simulated firings concluded that the search head of the MAR-1 is able to detect a low-power radar such as the EDT-FILA at distances greater than 50 km.

Until April 2012, over 20 missile test firings have been carried out by AMX aircraft.

In November 2012 an update to the missile's software was being introduced and the missile was undergoing final flight tests on A-1/AMX strike aircraft.

In December 2008 the Brazilian government approved the sale of 100 MAR-1 missiles to the Pakistan Air Force, in a contract worth $108 million. In April 2013 Mectron had integrated MAR-1 missiles with Pakistani Mirage III/V strike aircraft. Training rounds of the MAR-1 missile were also delivered, along with equipment for mission planning, logistics and support. Mectron is to finish development, testing and deliver the first operational missile rounds in 2014 to Brazil and Pakistan.

In October 2013, the UAE Armed Forces expressed its interest in purchasing a batch of missiles.

== Operators ==
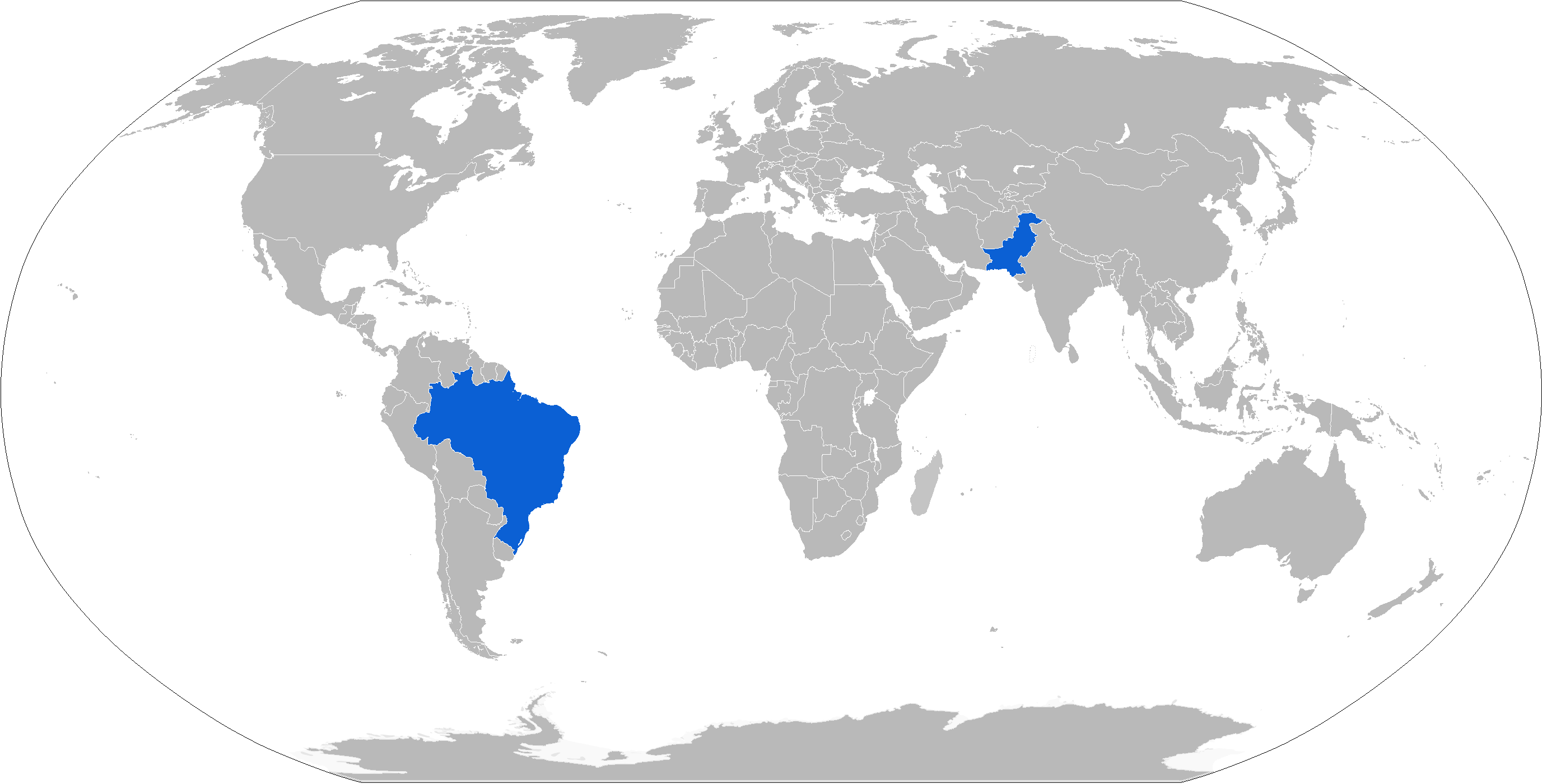
Map with MAR-1 operators

=== Current operators ===
Brazil

- Brazilian Air Force

Pakistan

- Pakistan Air Force

== See also ==
- Anti-radiation missile (ARM)
- List of missiles

Similar missiles

- Rudram-1 – (India)
- Hormuz-2 – (Iran)
- ALARM – (United Kingdom)
- AGM-45 Shrike – (United States)
- AGM-88 HARM – (United States)
- AGM-122 Sidearm – (United States)

Bibliography

- Crespo, Antonio (December 2006). "Nacionalização de Itens de Guerra Eletrônica: uma necessidade estratégica e logística". UNIFA (in Portuguese). 18 (21). Rio de Janeiro, Brazil: 136–141. ISSN 2175-2567.
- Wall, Robert (23 April 2012). Velocci, Anthony (ed.). "Guided Trajectory". Aviation Week & Space Technology. New York, United States: McGraw-Hill: 79–80. ISSN 0005-2175.
