= 151st Squadron (Turkey) =

151st Squadron "Vultures"
- 151'inci Tunç Filo
- Active: 1940 – present
- Country: Turkey
- Branch: Turkish Air Force
- Role: SEAD; Combat Air Patrol; Quick Reaction Alert
- Part of: Combatant Air Force: 5th Main Jet Base Command
- Garrison/HQ: Merzifon, Amasya
- Nickname(s): Deadly Vultures
- Motto(s): Give the coordinates for whoever you wanna mute, the rest is baSEAD Turn off the lights, the party is over! The Black Sea is Under Our Authority Guardians of the North

Aircraft flown
- Fighter: F-16C Block 50 Fighting Falcon

151st Squadron "Vultures" is a fighter squadron of the Turkish Air Force under the 5th Main Jet Base Command. It is the only squadron in the Air Force with SEAD capabilities and is the northernmost combatant NATO unit in Turkey.

As the only AGM-88 HARM operator, the squadron is often deployed to Incirlik Air Base. Following the outbreak of the Syrian civil war in 2011, the squadron's preparedness level was increased.

== History ==
=== Azerbaijan ===
Shortly after the beginning of the July 2020 Armenian–Azerbaijani clashes, Turkey declared diplomatic support to Azerbaijan, and stated that is ready to provide any kind of assistance, including weapons and military.

On 31 July 2020, Turkish Air Force elements, including aircraft from the 151st Squadron flown to Azerbaijan for the TurAz Eagle 2020 exercise, an annual cooperation between Turkish and Azerbaijani air forces since at least 2015.

Even though the exercise was concluded on 10 August, during the Second Nagorno-Karabakh War, satellite imagery of October 25 confirmed that six Turkish F-16s were deployed at Azerbaijan's Qabala International Airport.

A 29 September statement from the Ministry of Defence of Armenia claimed that their Sukhoi Su-25 was shot by a Turkish F-16, killing its pilot. Allegations also included that the Turkish Air Force provided close air support on Armenian military installations, which both were rejected by Turkey the same day.

== Lineage ==
=== Stations ===
- Çorlu Airport Command, 1940–1947
- 5th Main Jet Base Command, 1947-present

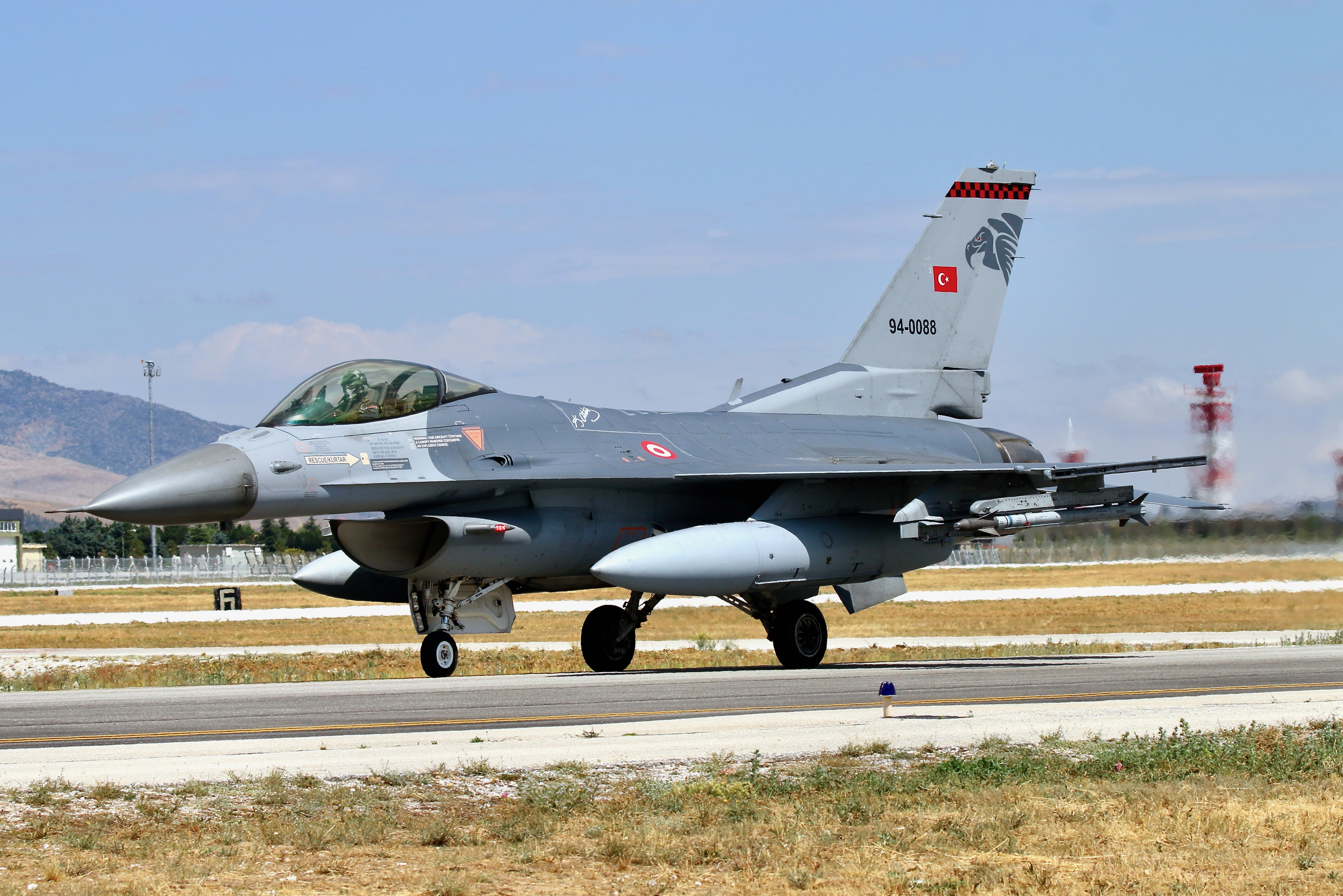
F-16C of the 151st Squadron at 3rd Main Jet Base

=== Aircraft ===
- Supermarine Spitfire, 1940-?
- Republic P-47 Thunderbolt, ?-1954
- Northrop F-5, 1972–1997
- General Dynamics F-16 Fighting Falcon, 1997-present
