= YJ-91 =

Chinese anti-radiation/anti-ship missile

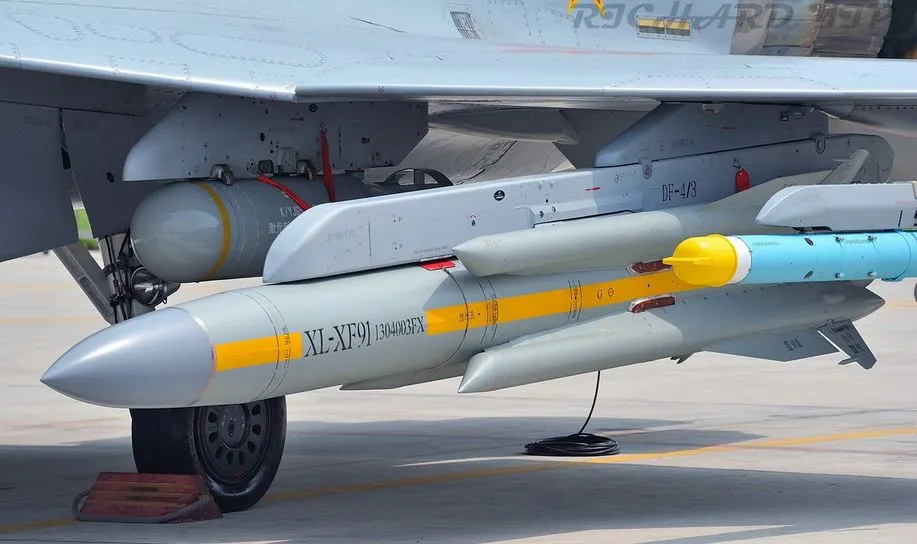
- YJ-91
- Type: Anti-radiation or anti-ship cruise missile
- Place of origin: People's Republic of China

Service history
- Used by: People's Republic of China

Specifications
- Warhead: 87–90 kg HE blast/fragmentation
- Operational range: 15-120 km
- Maximum speed: Mach 3.5
- Guidance system: Passive/anti-radiation
- Launch platform: Air launched

The YJ-91 (simplified Chinese: 鹰击-91; traditional Chinese: 鷹擊-91; lit. 'Eagle Strike-91') is an anti-radiation air-to-surface cruise missile produced by the People's Republic of China. It is a derivative of the Zvezda-Strela Kh-31P anti-radiation variant.

== Development ==
In 1994, China purchased the right to manufacture the Kh-31P missile but reportedly modified the seeker for the PLA's needs.

The YJ-91A is the anti-ship variant.

== Variants ==
YJ-91
Original variant. Anti-radiation missile.
YJ-91A
Anti-ship missile variant.

== Operators ==
China

- People's Liberation Army Air Force
- People's Liberation Army Naval Air Force
