= Boeing Defense, Space & Security =

Division of the Boeing Company

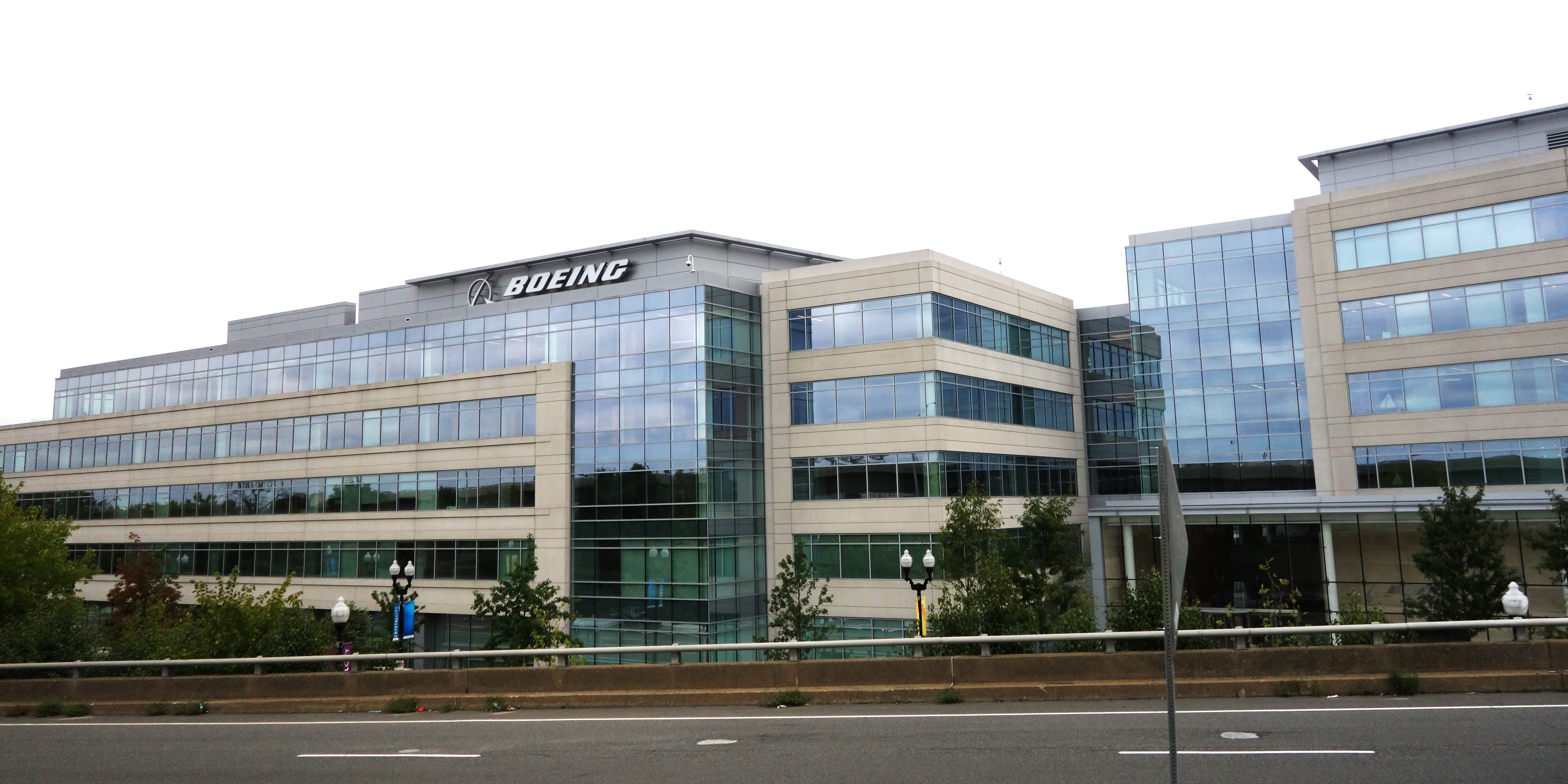
- Boeing Defense, Space & Security office in Arlington, Virginia
- Formerly: Boeing Military Airplane Company; Boeing Integrated Defense Systems
- Type: Division
- Industry: Aerospace and Defense
- Founded: 1939; 87 years ago
- Headquarters: St. Louis, MO, U.S.
- Area served: Worldwide
- Key people: Steve Parker (CEO)
- Revenue: ▼US$23.9 billion (2023)
- Operating income: ▲US$(5.4) billion (2023)
- Total assets: ▲US$15.4 billion (2023)
- Number of employees: ▲18,656 (2026)
- Parent: The Boeing Company
- Divisions: Rotorcraft Systems
- Subsidiaries: United Launch Alliance (50%)
- Website: www.boeing.com/company/about-bds
- Footnotes; Financials as of December 31, 2024. References

Boeing Defense, Space & Security (BDS) is a division of the Boeing Company based in St. Louis County, Missouri. The division builds military airplanes, rotorcraft, and missiles, as well as space systems for both commercial and military customers, including satellites, spacecraft, and rockets.

It was formerly known as Boeing Integrated Defense Systems (IDS), which was formed in 2002 by combining the former "Military Aircraft and Missile Systems" and "Space and Communications" divisions. The group that brought together major names in aerospace; Boeing Military Airplane Company; Hughes Satellite Systems; Hughes Helicopters (the civilian helicopter line was divested as MD Helicopters); Piasecki Helicopter (subsequently known as Boeing Vertol and Boeing Helicopters); the McDonnell division of McDonnell Douglas; and the former North American Aviation division of Rockwell International.

Boeing Defense, Space & Security made Boeing the third-largest defense contractor in the world in 2021 and helped make Boeing the second-largest U.S. federal government contractor in fiscal year 2019.

== History ==
Boeing Defense, Space & Security was headquartered in Greater St. Louis north of St. Louis Lambert International Airport in the northern St. Louis suburb of Berkeley, Missouri, until January 2017, when top executives and support staff were relocated to Arlington, Virginia. There are also significant operations in nearby Missouri communities, such as Hazelwood and St. Charles. It remains one of the largest employers in Greater St. Louis with 18,000 local employees as of 2026.

Other major locations of BDS are in California and Washington state. Boeing chose to locate the defense systems offices in the St. Louis area because of the role of the space and aircraft programs of the former McDonnell Douglas location, and bipartisan support from area politicians.

In 2016, Boeing moved the division headquarters from St. Louis to Arlington, Virginia, in the Washington, D.C. area and located close to the Pentagon.

On October 26, 2020, Boeing was sanctioned by the Chinese government due to arms sales to Taiwan.

In October 2024, The Wall Street Journal reported that Boeing was exploring a sale of some of its space division programs including the Starliner spacecraft and operations that support the International Space Station.

In February 2026 Boeing Defense, Space & Security headquarters returned to St. Louis

== Organization ==
Boeing BDS has four divisions focused on vertical lift; mobility, surveillance and bombers; air dominance; and space, intelligence and weapons systems.

- Vertical Lift – The world's largest provider of military rotorcraft including cargo, tiltrotor, and attack.
- Mobility, Surveillance & Bombers – Includes KC-46, SAOC, E-7, VC-25B, P-8, Bombers, AWACS/AEW&C.
- Air Dominance – Includes classified programs; the F/A-18, F-15, T-7, MQ-25 and MQ-28 programs; and the non-space Phantom Works portfolio.
- Space, Intelligence & Weapon Systems – Includes space exploration and launch programs, satellites, munitions, missiles, weapon system deterrents, maritime undersea, Phantom Works Space and subsidiaries (BI&A, Millennium, Insitu, Liquid Robotics, Spectrolab, Argon ST and DRT).

== Products ==
=== Bomber aircraft ===
- Boeing YB-9
- Boeing XB-15 (1 prototype)
- Boeing B-17 Flying Fortress
  - Boeing XB-38 Flying Fortress
  - Boeing YB-40 Flying Fortress
  - Boeing C-108 Flying Fortress
  - List of Boeing B-17 Flying Fortress variants
- Boeing Y1B-20
- Boeing B-29 Superfortress
  - Boeing KB-29 Superfortress
  - Boeing XB-39 Superfortress
  - B-29 Superfortress variants
- Boeing B-47 Stratojet
- Boeing B-50 Superfortress
- Boeing B-52 Stratofortress
- Boeing B-54
- Boeing XB-55
- Boeing XB-56
- Boeing XB-59
- Boeing TB – torpedo bomber
- Rockwell B-1 Lancer — from acquisition of North American Aviation division of Rockwell International

=== Rotorcraft ===
- Boeing AH-6
- Boeing AH-64 Apache
- Boeing Vertol CH-46 Sea Knight (Vertol Aircraft Corp.)
- Boeing Vertol CH-47 Chinook (Vertol Aircraft Corp.)
  - Boeing Chinook (UK variants)
- Boeing Vertol YUH-61
- Boeing Vertol XCH-62
- MH-139 Grey Wolf (with Leonardo S.p.A.)
- V-22 Osprey (with Bell Helicopter)
- Quad TiltRotor (with Bell Helicopter)
- RAH-66 Comanche (with Sikorsky), reconnaissance and light attack helicopter, canceled
- SkyHook JHL-40

=== Fighter and attack aircraft ===
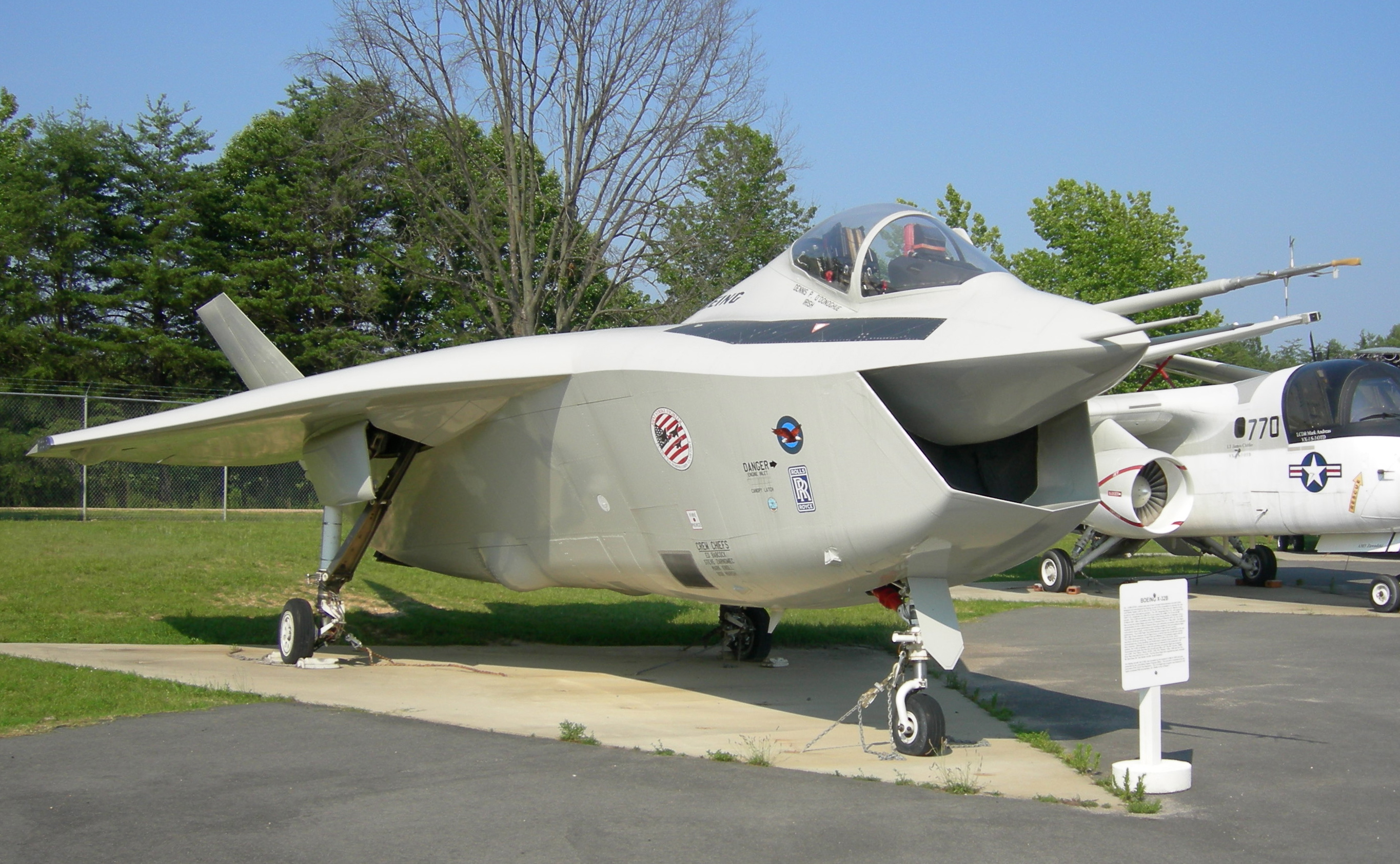
X-32B Joint Strike Fighter

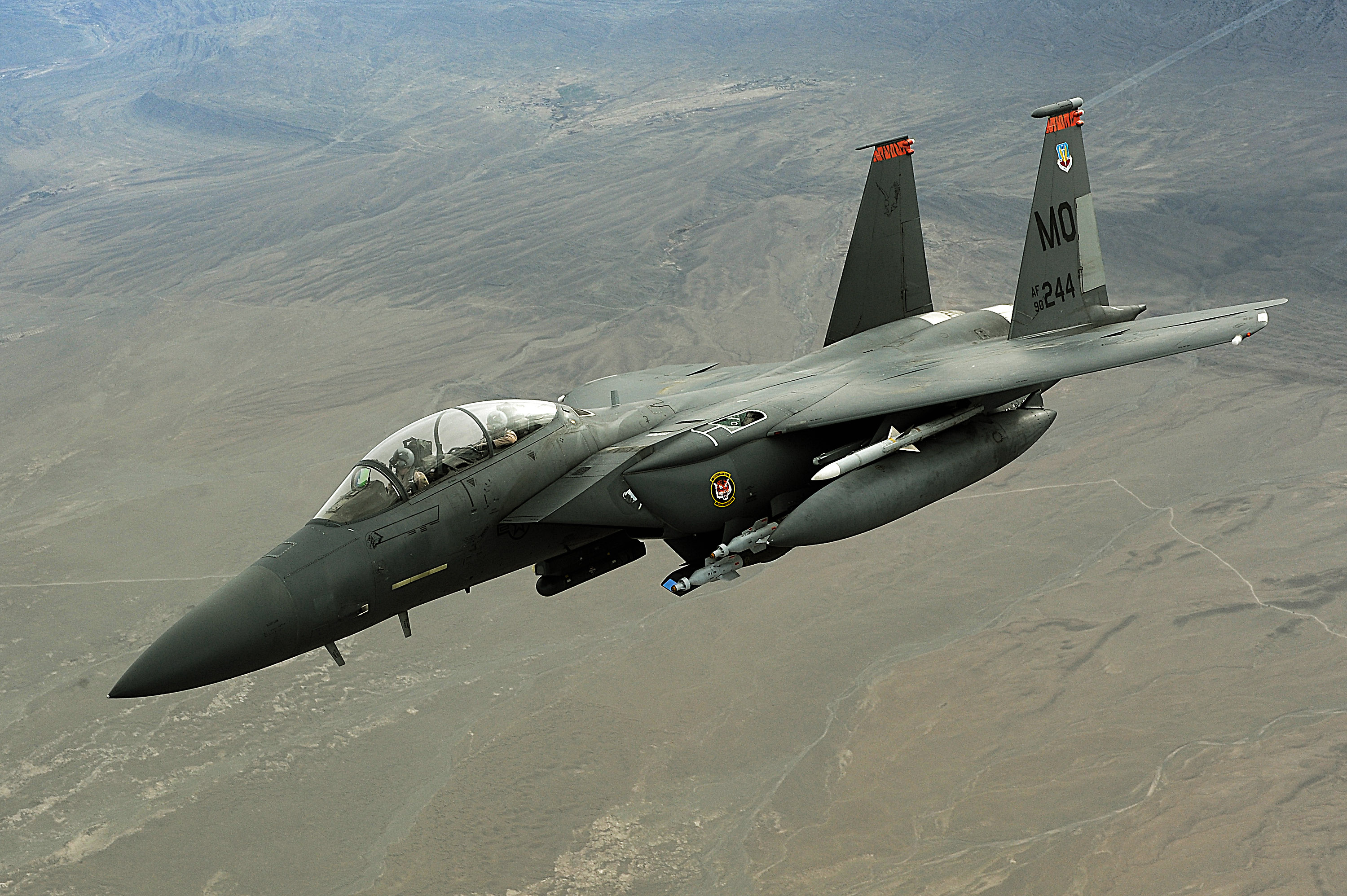
F-15E Strike Eagle

- Boeing Model 15
- Boeing F2B
- Boeing F3B
- Boeing XF6B
- Boeing XF8B
- Boeing F-15E Strike Eagle
  - Boeing F-15SE Silent Eagle
  - Boeing F-15EX Eagle II
- Boeing F/A-18E/F Super Hornet
  - Boeing EA-18G Growler
- Lockheed Martin F-22 Raptor (partner with prime contractor Lockheed Martin)
- Boeing GA-1
- Boeing XP-4
- Boeing XP-7
- Boeing XP-8
- Boeing XP-9
- Boeing P-12
- Boeing XP-15
- Boeing P-26 Peashooter
- Boeing P-29
- Boeing X-32, Boeing's entry for the Joint Strike Fighter program
- Boeing F-47
- Boeing F/A-XX

=== Experimental aircraft ===
- Boeing Bird of Prey
- Boeing X-40
- Boeing X-53 Active Aeroelastic Wing

=== Tankers and transport aircraft ===
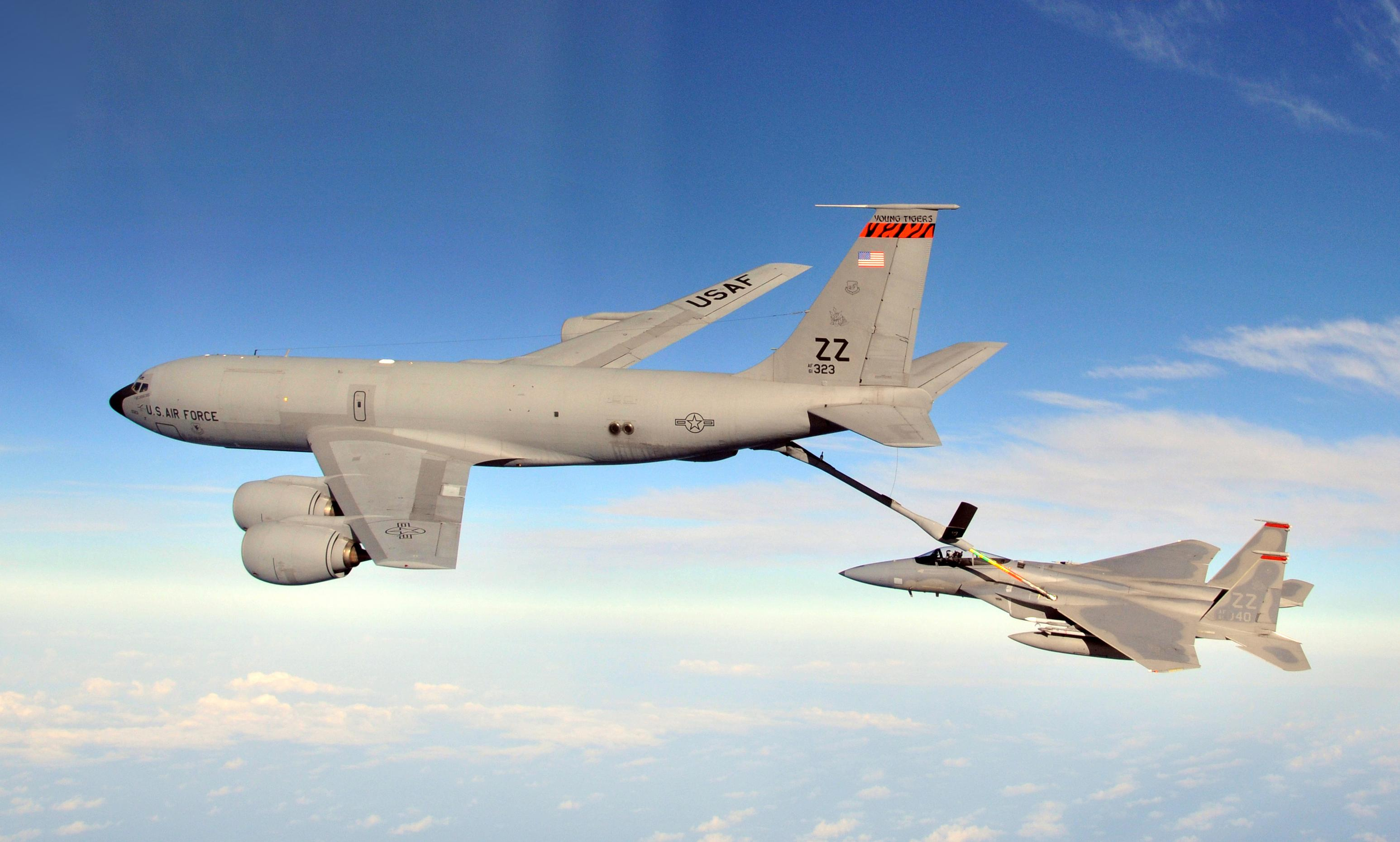
KC-135 Stratotanker refuels F-15C Eagle

- Boeing YC-14
- Boeing C-17 Globemaster III
- Boeing C-22
- Boeing VC-25
- Boeing C-32
- Boeing C-40 Clipper
- Boeing KC-46 Pegasus
- Boeing C-97 Stratofreighter
  - Boeing KC-97 Stratofreighter
- Boeing C-127
- Boeing KC-135 Stratotanker
  - Boeing C-135 Stratolifter
  - Boeing EC-135
  - Boeing NC-135
  - Boeing OC-135B Open Skies – (3 Treaty on Open Skies observation aircraft)
  - Boeing RC-135
  - Boeing WC-135 Constant Phoenix
- Boeing C-137 Stratoliner
  - Boeing CC-137
- Boeing KC-767
- Boeing Pelican

=== Trainer aircraft ===
- Boeing Model 2
- Boeing XAT-15
- Boeing NB
- Boeing T-43 navigator trainer
- Boeing Skyfox
- Boeing–Saab T-7 Red Hawk

=== Electronic warfare, surveillance and other military variants ===
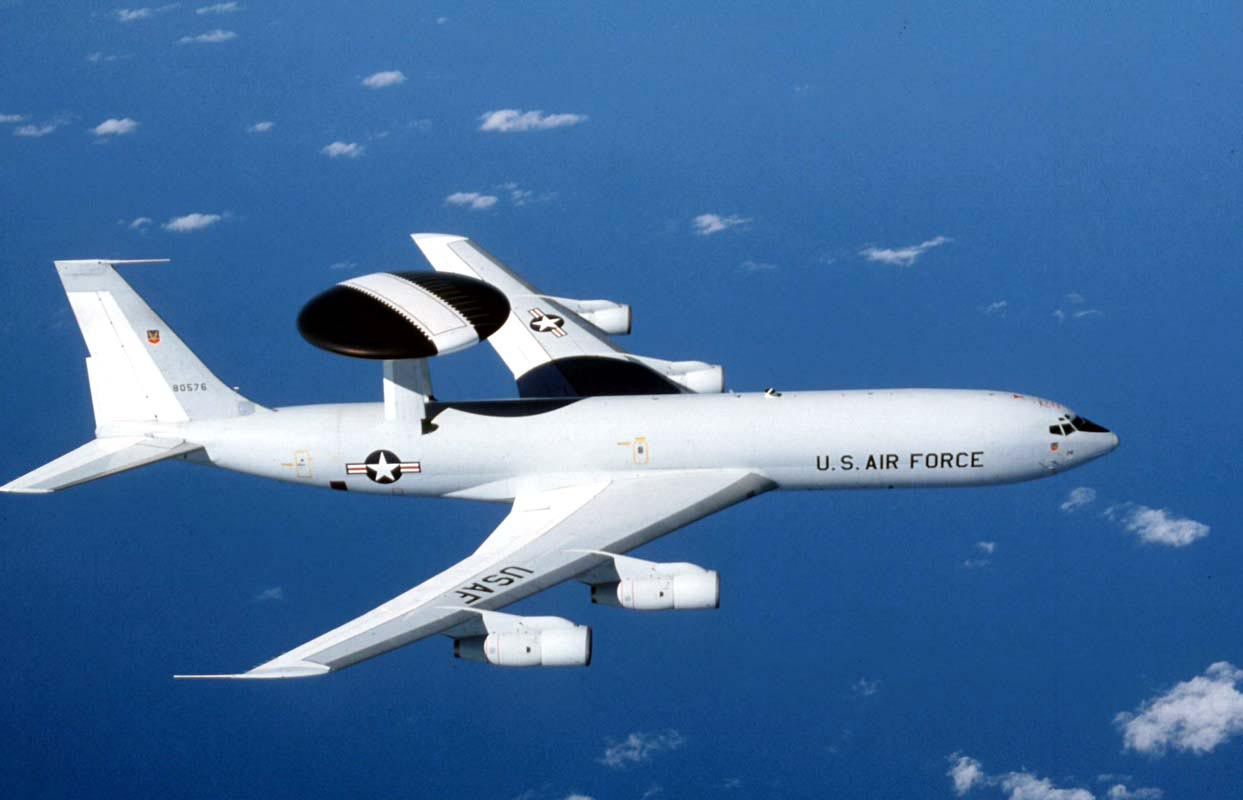
E-3 Sentry

- Boeing 737 AEW&C (E-7 Wedgetail)
- Boeing Model 42
- Boeing YAL-1 Airborne Laser
- Boeing E-3 Sentry (an Airborne Early Warning and Control or AWACS surveillance aircraft)
- Boeing E-4 (Advanced Airborne Command Post)
- Boeing E-6 Mercury
- Boeing E-767 (AWACS)
- Boeing P-8 Poseidon (Anti-submarine warfare)
- Boeing XPB
- Boeing XP3B
- Boeing XPBB Sea Ranger
- Boeing RC-135

=== Utility aircraft ===
- Boeing Model 1
- Boeing L-15 Scout

=== Unmanned aerial vehicles ===
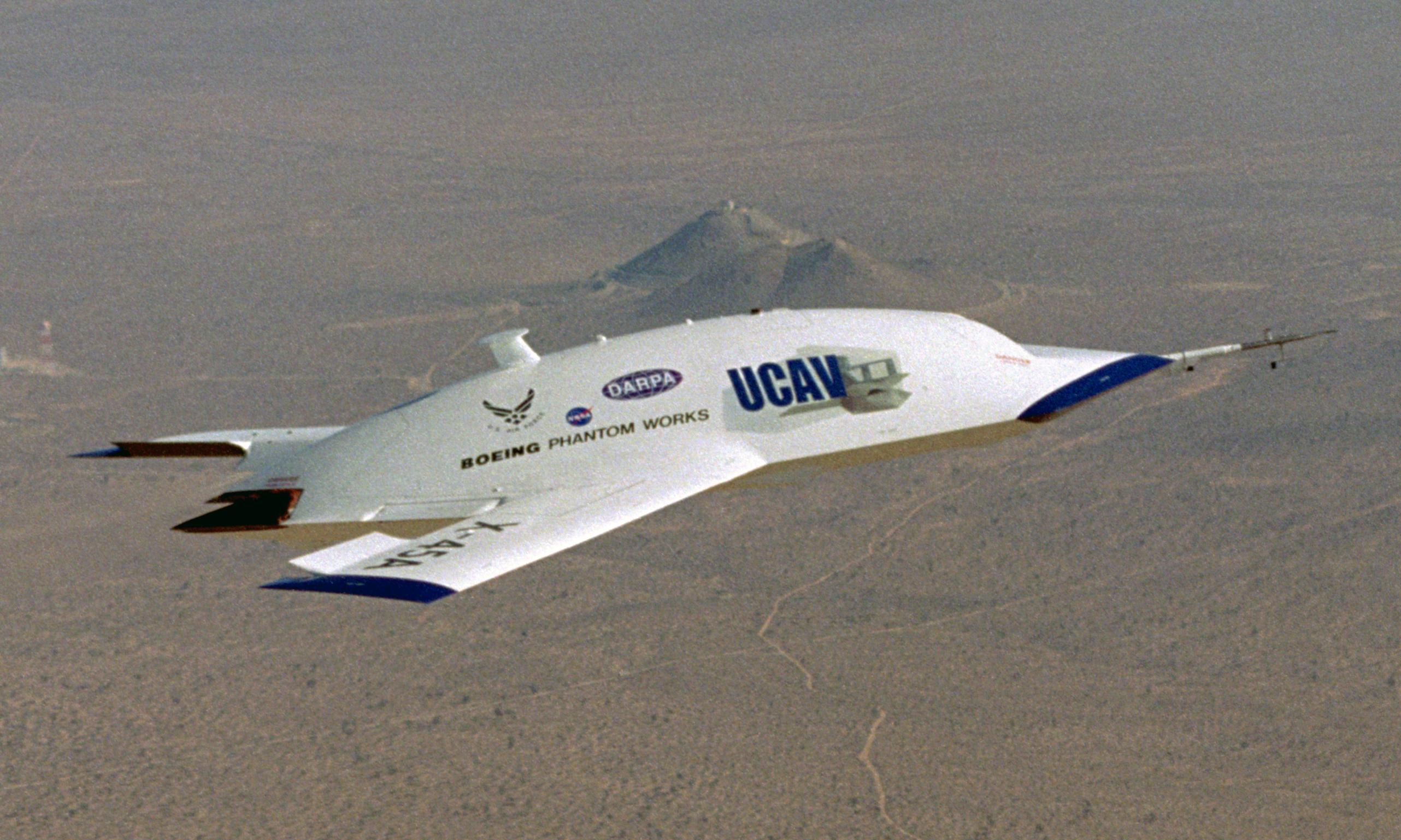
The X-45A UAV, a prototype for the significantly larger X-45C

- Boeing Insitu RQ-21 Blackjack
- Boeing YQM-94
- Boeing CQM-121 Pave Tiger – anti-radar drone
- Boeing X-45/Phantom Ray – technology demonstrators
- Boeing X-46
- Boeing X-48
- Boeing X-50 Dragonfly – experimental Gyrodyne UAV
- Boeing X-51
- Boeing A160 Hummingbird – development UAV helicopter
- Boeing Condor
- Boeing DARPA Vulture
- Boeing HALE
- Boeing Insitu ScanEagle
- Boeing MQ-25 Stingray
- Boeing Phantom Eye – a high altitude, long range UAV
- Boeing Persistent Munition Technology Demonstrator
- Boeing SolarEagle
- GQM-163 Coyote
- MA-31
- Boeing MQ-28 Ghost Bat – previously known as Airpower Teaming System

=== Missiles ===
- Arrow 3
- CIM-10 Bomarc
- LGM-30 Minuteman
- AGM-69 SRAM
- AGM-86 ALCM cruise missile
- MGM-118 Peacekeeper
- Ground-Based Midcourse Defense
  - Ground-Based Interceptor
- UUM-125 Sea Lance
- AGM-131 SRAM II
- Boeing Ground-to-Air Pilotless Aircraft
- Harpoon (missile)
  - Standoff Land Attack Missile
  - AGM-84H/K SLAM-ER

=== Space launch and spacecraft ===
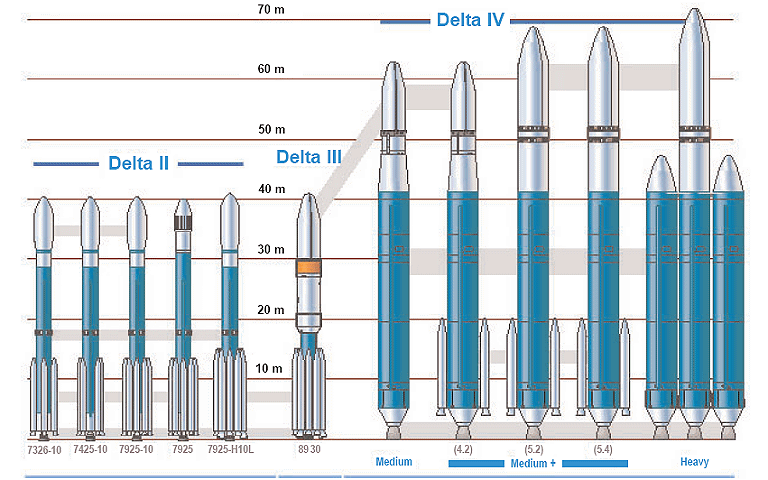
Delta rocket family

Boeing Launch Services Inc. (BLS) is Boeing's commercial launch service provider. On behalf of its commercial customers, BLS administers launch service contracts for Delta II and Delta IV launches conducted by United Launch Alliance. In November 2010, Boeing Defense, Space & Security was selected by NASA for consideration for potential contract awards for heavy lift launch vehicle system concepts, and propulsion technologies.

- S-IC first stage
- Lunar Roving Vehicle
- X-38 Crew Return Vehicle
- Inertial Upper Stage (Titan IV and Space Shuttle)
- International Space Station
- Space Shuttle orbiter (Rockwell)
- Delta (rocket family) (aka Thor-Delta)
  - Delta II rocket
  - Delta III rocket
  - Delta IV rocket
- Sea Launch (with Energia, Aker Kværner, and Yuzhnoe)
- Starliner crewed space capsule
- Space Launch System
  - core stage
  - Exploration Upper Stage

=== Spaceplanes ===
- Boeing X-20 Dyna-Soar (canceled)
- Boeing X-37
- Boeing X-40

=== Satellites ===
- 333 bus (Hughes Satellite Systems)
- 376 bus (inherited from Hughes Satellite Systems)
- 601 bus (inherited from Hughes Satellite Systems)
- 702 bus
- ARGOS
- Autonomous Space Transport Robotic Operations (ASTRO)
- GPS Block I and II (Rockwell)
- Integrated Solar Upper Stage
- Kinetic Energy Anti-Satellite Weapon System
- XSS Micro-satellite

=== Space probes ===
- Lunar Orbiter program
- Surveyor program
- Mariner 10
- Mars Science Laboratory

=== Other ===
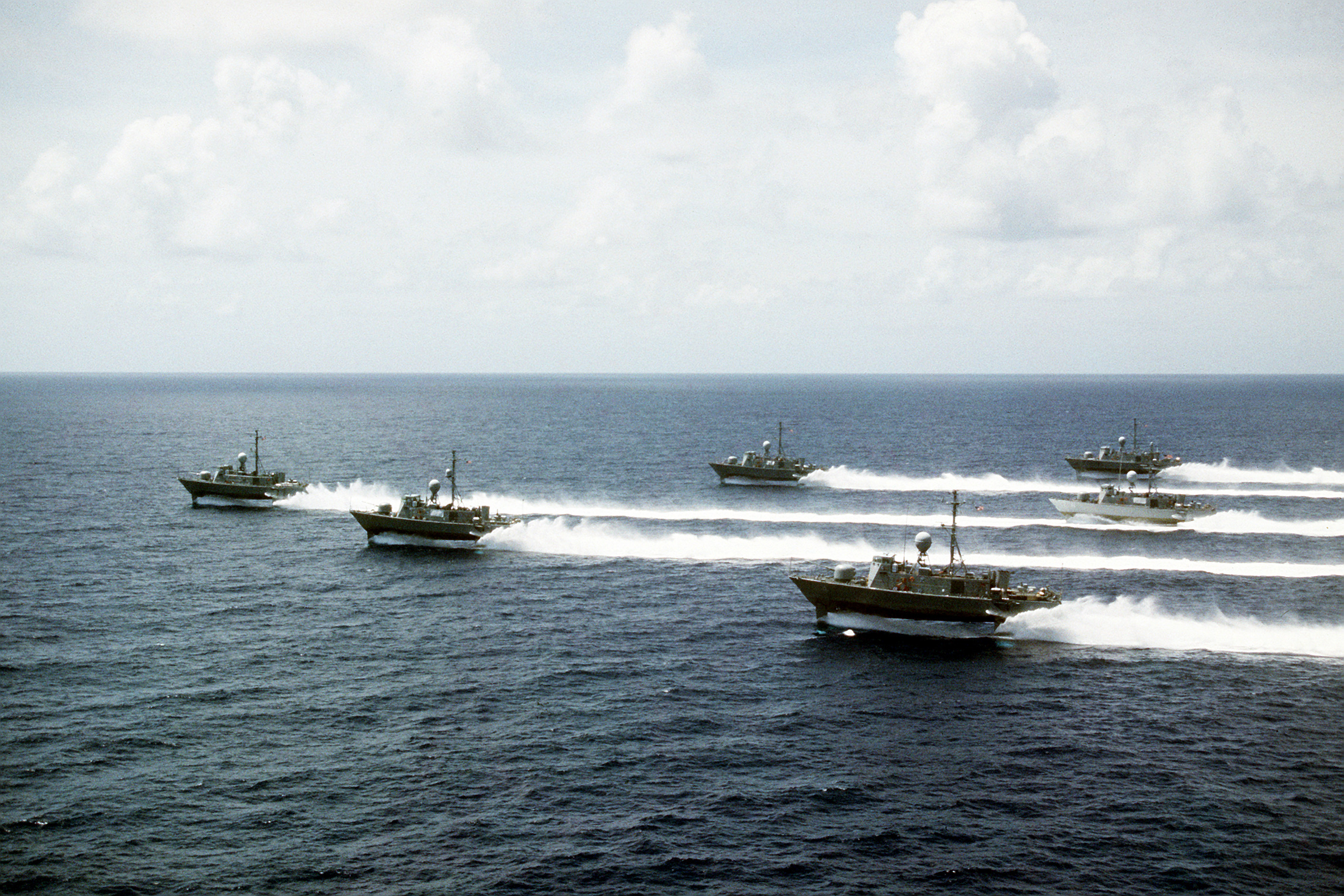
the Pegasus-class hydrofoils

- AN/TWQ-1 Avenger – lightweight air defense vehicle
- Pegasus-class hydrofoil – patrol craft (6 built by Boeing Marine)
- GBU-39 Small Diameter Bomb – 250 lb glide bomb
- Compact Laser weapon system
- Tactical Laser weapon system

== Facilities ==
On July 21, 2006, Boeing announced that it would consolidate its Southern California locations. The Boeing facility in Anaheim will be moving to Huntington Beach, California.

- Huntsville, Alabama (Spacelab, International Space Station, Delta, Ground-based Midcourse Defense)
- Mesa, Arizona (AH-64, AH-6i)
- Anaheim, California
- El Segundo, California (satellite complex: 601, 702)
- Long Beach, California (C-17 until 2015)
- Palmdale, California (Space Shuttle)
- Pleasanton, California
- Seal Beach, California Saturn V rocket and Apollo Capsule (original contractor North American later Rockwell International)
- Huntington Beach, California (Saturn V, X-51A, Apollo, Skylab, Space Shuttle, Delta, and ISS)
- Kennedy Space Center, Florida (as part of United Space Alliance and United Launch Alliance)
- Macon, Georgia (C-17, A-10, CH-47) Closing down December 2016
- New Orleans, Louisiana (S-IC stage – Boeing was the prime contractor where the Michoud Assembly Facility was used for the final assembly)
- St. Louis, Missouri (F-15, F/A-18, F-47)
- St. Charles, Missouri (weapons)
- Tulsa, Oklahoma (F-15/F-15E)
- Philadelphia, Pennsylvania (H-47, V-22) H-46 production ended.
- El Paso, Texas (B-1B, PAC-3, power and electronics components for ISS, F-22, and F-15, assembly and test for Minuteman III missile guidance system)
- Houston, Texas
- San Antonio, Texas (military aircraft maintenance)
- Puget Sound region, Washington
- Washington, D.C. area

== See also ==
- Boeing Rotorcraft Systems
- Airbus Defence and Space
- Lockheed Martin Space Systems
- NewSpace
- Northrop Grumman
