= AQM-127 SLAT =

AQM-127
- Type: Target drone
- Place of origin: United States

Production history
- Designed: 1984
- Manufacturer: Martin Marietta
- No. built: 15

Specifications
- Mass: 2,400 pounds (1,100 kg)
- Length: 17.9 ft (5.47 m)
- Diameter: 21 in (54 cm)
- Engine: Marquardt ramjet with integrated Thiokol solid rocket booster
- Operational range: 55 nautical miles (102 km; 63 mi)
- Maximum speed: Mach 2.5

The AQM-127 Supersonic Low-Altitude Target (SLAT) was a target drone developed during the 1980s by Martin Marietta for use by the United States Navy. Derived from Martin Marietta's work on the cancelled ASALM missile, SLAT proved to have severe difficulties in flight testing, and the project was cancelled during 1991.

== Design and development ==
Development of what became the YAQM-127 was initiated in 1983 following the cancellation of the BQM-111 Firebrand. A replacement for the MQM-8 Vandal target drone was still required, and a specification was developed for a target drone, capable of being recovered via parachute and reused, for launch from a variety of aircraft.

Bids for the contract were submitted by Martin Marietta, Ling-Temco-Vought, and Teledyne Ryan, with the Martin Marietta design being judged the winner of the design competition in September 1984. Derived from the cancelled Advanced Strategic Air-Launched Missile developed by Martin Marietta for the United States Air Force, the missile utilised a Marquardt hybrid rocket-ramjet propulsion system, with a solid rocket booster providing initial thrust, with the rocket's chamber, following burnout, becoming the combustion chamber for a ramjet sustainer. The AQM-127 was designed to fly at speeds of Mach 2.5 at an altitude of 30 feet (9 m), following a pre-programmed course on autopilot. The SLAT was to be fitted with radar signature augmentors and a radar seeker emulator; initial operational capability was projected for 1991.

== Operational history ==
The first test launch of the fifteen YAQM-127A pre-production test missiles produced was conducted on November 20, 1987. A further five test flights were conducted between then and January 1989; however only one of the six tests proved a success. Following a twenty-two month stand-down to reassess the program and modify the missile design, flight testing resumed in November 1990; this test also was a failure, as was a final attempt at a test in May 1991.

With the SLAT proving a consistent failure and the cost of the project increasing dramatically, the United States Congress stepped in, and during the summer of 1991 the AQM-127 program was cancelled. The Navy, still requiring a new high-speed target drone to replace the Vandal, would turn to a drone conversion of a Russian missile, the MA-31, as an interim solution. This drone entered service in small numbers during 1999.

== See also ==
- Crow (missile)
- GQM-163 Coyote
- Kh-31
