= C127 =

C127 may refer to:

- mouse C127 mammalian cell line, a cell line used for Saizen production by recombinant DNA technology
- the name for the Maximum Weight Convention, 1967
- Point Lonsdale Road, a road connected to Bellarine Highway, in Australia

C-127 may refer to:

- Boeing C-127, a designation for a proposed, large, turboshaft -driven transport aircraft to have been built in the early 1950s by the United States

C.127 may refer to:

- CASA C.127, a designation for Dornier Do 27 aircraft built in Spain
