= AGR-14 =

«©»CG-17 may refer to:

- AGR-14 ZAP, a U.S. Navy project to develop an anti-flak unguided rocket
- USS Interpreter (AGR-14), a Guardian-class radar picket ship of the US Navy
