= Shamrock Holdings =

Company that manages Roy Edward Disney's personal holdings

Shamrock Holdings, Inc.
- Type: Private
- Industry: Holding company
- Founded: 1978; 48 years ago
- Founder: Roy E. Disney
- Successor: Shamrock Capital Advisors
- Headquarters: Burbank, California, United States
- Owner: Disney family
- Subsidiaries: Shamrock Holdings of California
- Website: shamrock.com

Shamrock Holdings, Inc., or Shamrock, is a private equity firm founded as the Roy E. Disney family's investment firm; the Disney family remains its sole investor. Shamrock is a private corporation, and is fully owned by the estate of Roy E. Disney.

Disney was the chairman of Shamrock, and Stanley Gold was its president and CEO. Shamrock assets include hotels and radio and television stations. Shamrock often takes an aggressive strategy, launching hostile takeovers.

== History ==
Shamrock Holdings Inc. (SHI) was founded in 1978 as an investment company by Roy E. Disney. Shamrock then started buying television and radio stations. In the mid-1980s, SH moved into other industries. According to Reuters, in 1984 Shamrock held 1,428,061 (or just over 4%) of all Disney stock.

Shamrock Capital Advisors is a successor company to SHI.

After revealing that the company held 4.7% of Central Soya and agreements with two investment groups for another 5.9% in March 1985, the company offered to purchase the remaining shares with equity partners. SH closed on the purchase of Central Soya. In November, Shamrock began construction on Shamrock Plaza office building in Agoura Hills estimated to cost $5.1 million.

In March 1986, Shamrock sold 1.6 million shares of the Walt Disney Co. on the open market dropping its share from 4% to 3% for tax planning and further business needs.

In April 1987 its subsidiary, Shamrock Holdings of California, purchased a controlling interest in DBMS Inc. of Naperville, Ill., a software systems and services company. After the management team of Holly Sugar submitted a plan to take the company private, two shareholders - Shamrock (5.5%) and Brookehill Equities (11.8%) - filed separately with the SEC with the intent to possibly make a counter offer.

In fall 1987, Central Soya, a soybean processor, was sold by Shamrock to Ferruzzi Group of Italy, making a profit of $125 million. In December 1987, the corporation attempted a buyout of Wherehouse Entertainment, who avoided the takeover by agreeing to be bought by Adler & Shaykin, a New York investment firm. Instead, Shamrock purchased Music Plus from Show Industries in April 1988 to begin its move into home entertainment retailing.

In 1988 and 1989, it pursued Polaroid, ultimately failing to take over the company but winning concessions such as an advertising deal for its television stations.

SH agreed in January 1990 to sell radio station KMGC-FM to Cooke Inlet Radio Partners for $22 million. In September 1991, Shamrock sold its remaining 11.8% share in Enterra for about $46.8 million.

In October 1992, the corporation agreed to sell to Blockbuster Entertainment Corporation its Music Plus and Sound Warehouse music and video chains for $185 million. SH indicated that purchases of additional radio stations were planned given depreciated values and changes in FCC regulations allowing more stations to be owned by a single owner.

In August 1995, Shamrock agreed to sell Shamrock Broadcasting, a 19 radio stations group, to Chancellor Broadcasting Co. for $395 million.

Shamrock sold a 20% share of Koor Industries Ltd. to Claridge Israel Ltd. in 1997. In June 1999, Shamrock and First Israel Mezzanine Investors Ltd. purchased Tadiran Communications Ltd., an Israel defense communication contractor, from Tadiran Ltd., a subsidiary of Koor as of 1998.

In 1999, Shamrock Holdings of California Inc. (SH/CA) finished building its Manhattan Beach Studios at an estimated cost of $82 million. The studios included 14 sound stages, eight production office buildings, and Media Center, a 60,000-square-foot office building. Raleigh Enterprises was hired to manage the studio. Ronald Flesch, a real estate developer, and Alice Neuhauser, a motion picture financier, sued SH over the studio claiming that it was their idea they brought to Shamrock in a joint venture deal and that Shamrock cut them out of the project.

In November 2003, SH/CA sold its Manhattan Beach Studios to Oak Tree Capital Management Co. for about $100 million.

From 2003 to 2005, Shamrock was an instrumental force in the SaveDisney campaign and the ouster of Michael Eisner as CEO of The Walt Disney Company. As of 2003 Roy E. Disney held about 1% of Disney stock through Shamrock Holdings. This made him the third largest individual stakeholder of Disney stock.

Shamrock Holdings' Capital Growth Fund purchased an 80% stake in the Harlem Globetrotters in September 2005 with the intent to increase merchandising and other income. By November, Shamrock Capital Advisors raised $125 million towards possible investments in Israeli companies from Israeli and U.S. pension funds, insurance companies and commercial banks.

In July 2006 one of Roy E. Disney's daughters, Abigail, became Vice Chairman of Shamrock. In October, Shamrock Activist Value Fund sued iPass Inc., a SH holding, to turn over boardroom records over failure to fire their CEO and mismanagement of a takeover.

In March 2007 the corporation's Capital Growth Fund invested $50 million into Real D company, a 3D movie equipment manufacturer.

Shamrock Holdings bought a 5.5% stake in Texas Industries in 2008. Shamrock revealed in December 2008 that it held a 5.7% share of Arris Group. In October 2009, SH won a shareholders proxy fight at Texas Industries, of which SH owns 10%, over management performance. The corporation took a stake in West Pharmaceutical Service by December 2009. Other holdings in 2009 were Coinstar, Websense, and Magellan Health Services. Roy E. Disney died on December 16, 2009.

In October 2018, Shamrock Capital acquired the songwriting catalogue of music producers Stargate. Sony/ATV Music Publishing will continue to administer the catalogue.

Shamrock's music catalogue includes the catalogue of dance label Om Records, and the Bass Brothers' production royalties for Eminem.

On February 12, 2019, Shamrock sold its assets on INgrooves to Universal Music Group.

In June 2020, Shamrock acquired the advertising trade publication Adweek from Canadian private equity firm Beringer Capital.

In November 2020, Shamrock acquired ownership of the master recordings of Taylor Swift's first six studio albums from Big Machine Records (2006–2017), which itself had been sold to media manager Scooter Braun's Ithaca Ventures. In May 2025, Swift announced on her social media that she had acquired the rights to all content previously held by Shamrock.

Under Amy Buckner Chowdhry's leadership, AnswerLab secured a growth investment from Shamrock in September 2022.

== Shamrock Broadcasting ==
Shamrock Broadcasting Company, Inc.
- Type: Private
- Industry: Broadcasting
- Founded: July 3, 1979
- Defunct: August 1995
- Fate: Sold
- Successor: Chancellor Broadcasting
- Number of locations: 21
- Owner: Shamrock Holdings, Inc. Trefoil Capital Investors L.P.

Shamrock Broadcasting was a broadcasting station operating company owned by Shamrock Holdings and Trefoil Capital Investors.

Shamrock Broadcasting was incorporated on July 3, 1979.

Shamrock Broadcasting (SB) agreed to purchase Malrite Communications Group radio operations in March 1993 via a stock swap worth more than $300 million pushing SB's ownership to 21 radio stations. Trefoil Capital Investors was the primary financier of the deal. In July, Shamrock Broadcasting purchased KZLA radio station. In August, the Malrite radio deal was closed making the Malrite owner a minority shareholder and board director of Shamrock Holding.

In March 1995, Shamrock Broadcasting purchased from Premiere Radio Networks its Denver FM radio station for $5.5 million.

In August 1995, Shamrock agreed to sell Shamrock Broadcasting, a 19 radio stations group, to Chancellor Broadcasting Co. for $395 million.

== Trefoil Investors ==
Trefoil Capital Investors (TCI) is a partnership formed by Shamrock Holdings with the raising of $450 million from investors by July 1990 that looked to invest in distressed companies. TCI agreed to purchase Child World in July 1990 in a two-stage process, by taking on some of its parent company CNC Holding Corp.'s debt, then purchase the 18% shares outstanding on the public market. Conditions that had to be met for the deal to go through were raising $250 in working capital by Trefoil and Child World remaining stable. A downturn in the Northwest region, where Child World is based, lead Trefoil to terminate the deal in November 1990.

Trefoil Investors II is an investment company of Roy Disney and other senior executives of Shamrock Holdings Inc. In October 1994, Trefoil Investors II purchased a significant stake in Fantastic Foods Inc., a natural-foods company with annual revenues nearing $30 million on Nature's Burger hamburger alternative and instant soups and mixes.

== See also ==
- Taylor Swift masters dispute
- Retlaw Enterprises, Walt Disney's family corporation
