= Stanley Gold =

American lawyer

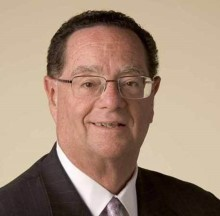
- Born: Stanley Phillip Gold; September 10, 1942 (age 83); Los Angeles, California
- Education: University of California, Los Angeles (A.B.); USC Gould School of Law (J.D)
- Employer: Shamrock Holdings
- Title: Chairman
- Political party: Democratic
- Board member of: Chair, Jewish Federation of Greater Los Angeles; Hebrew Union College-Jewish Institute of Religion chairman emeritus, University of Southern California iPass, Inc. Walt Disney Company NYSE: DIS(formerly); Tadiran (formerly); Ansell, Ltd ASX: ANN (alternate); L.A. Gear, Inc.
- Spouse(s): Ilene Carol Gold, née Glasberg
- Children: Charles and Jennifer

Gold in March 2004 address the media at a press conference, following a meeting with investors to persuade them to withhold support for Michael Eisner.

Stanley Phillip Gold (born September 10, 1942) is the former president and CEO of Shamrock Holdings, Roy E. Disney's private investment company, from 1985 to 2013, and is currently serving as chairman of its board of directors. He was on the Walt Disney Company board, in 1984 and during 1987–2003. He and Roy resigned to publicly campaign for the ousting of then-CEO and chairman Michael Eisner. He had also helped to both oust former CEO Ron W. Miller, and hire Eisner, in 1984. He is a past chairman of the USC board of trustees, and of the University of Southern California Law School, and has been a significant political contributor.

== Early life and education ==
Gold was born to a Jewish family in Los Angeles, California. He grew up in South Los Angeles, near Dorsey High School. The family moved to the San Fernando Valley when he was a teenager. After graduation from Van Nuys High School, he entered University of California, Berkeley. There, he dated his future wife, Ilene. He completed an A.B. in political science at U.C.L.A. and, in 1967, earned a Juris Doctor degree at University of Southern California, then completed post-graduate work at Cambridge University, England.

== Career ==
He practiced law, with Martin Gang, at Gang, Tyre, Ramer & Brown law firm, from 1968, later becoming its managing partner. He specialized in corporate acquisitions, sales and financing.

He has served as president of Shamrock Broadcasting; president, then chairman, of Central Soya; chairman of Enterra Corporation, chairman of Israeli investment firm Koor Industries Ltd. (NYSE: KOR), and chairman of Tadiran, among other positions.

== Philanthropy ==
At a banquet honoring U.S. Ambassador John Marshall Evans, on 4 March 2007; Gold pledged $100,000 to the USC Institute of Armenian Studies. In 2001, he pledged $500,000 to establish the Martin Gang Scholarship Fund at Hebrew Union College; Roy and Patty Disney pledged an additional $100,000.

Gold was a fund raiser and donor for Ehud Barak's successful campaign in the 1999 Israeli prime ministerial election.

Gold has been a contributor to American federal political campaigns for many years, largely contributing to Democrats, both candidates and organizations, such as the (Democratic Congressional Campaign Committee, Democratic Senatorial Campaign Committee, and Democratic National Committee); Gold has also donated to some Republican party candidates, including George W. Bush, Robert Dole, Richard Lugar, Mitt Romney, Arlen Specter, William Weld, and Pete Wilson). OpenSecrets reported donations of $238,000 during 1993 to 17 December 2008, including a few non-federal contributions.

He is a supporter of the Two-state solution in the Middle East. In April 2013, Gold was one of 100 prominent American Jews who sent a letter to Israeli Prime Minister Benjamin Netanyahu, urging him to "work closely" with Secretary of State John Kerry, "to devise pragmatic initiatives, consistent with Israel's security needs, which would represent Israel's readiness to make painful territorial sacrifices for the sake of peace."

== Memberships ==
- Sigma Alpha Mu
- Wilshire Boulevard Temple, past board member
- University of Southern California, chairman of the board of trustees; mentor to university president, Steven B. Sample

== Personal life ==
Among the artifacts displayed in his study at home are personalized autographs from both Babe Ruth and Stan Musial. He collects Porsche automobiles.
