= Boeing Persistent Munition Technology Demonstrator =

Persistent Munition Technology Demonstrator (PMTD)
- Boeing PMTD

General information
- Type: Remote controlled UAV
- Manufacturer: Boeing Integrated Defense Systems
- Status: Testing to improve future UAVs
- Primary user: Boeing

History
- First flight: April, 2006

The Persistent Munition Technology Demonstrator or PMTD is an unmanned aerial vehicle (UAV) developed and produced by the Advanced Weapons and Missile Systems division of Boeing as a test bed in order to further develop and flight test various UAV technologies. It has also been referred to as the Dominator. The PMTD weighs 60 pounds (27 kg), has a 12 feet (3.7 m) wingspan and is powered by a single piston engine driving a pusher propeller. It was first flown in April, 2006, at Vandalia Municipal Airport, Vandalia, Illinois.

Designed for either air or ground launch and high loiter times, the PMTD has the ability to operate completely autonomously. During its maiden flight, the UAV autonomously flew to 14 programmed locations, changed altitude four times, and met all programmed speeds. The initial set of flight tests focused solely on validation of the autonomous flight mode, while future tests will include sensor integration, weapon guidance systems, munitions dispensing systems and in-flight refueling.

EDO Corporation funded the development of the aircraft's composite airframe, while Boeing funded all the flight tests.

Just-in-Time Strike Augmentation (JITSA) is a United States Air Force program proposal for network-centric operations to command the battlefield from the air using the C-17 Globemaster III to launch large numbers of PMTD into the battlespace.

== See also ==
- Unmanned Combat Air Vehicle
- Joint Direct Attack Munition
