= ASALM =

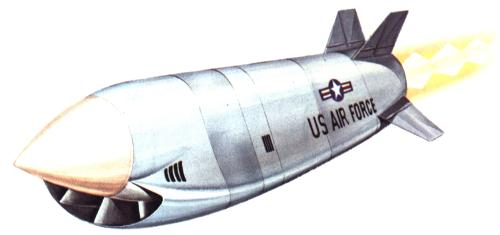
- Martin Marietta ASALM
- Type: High supersonic Air-launched cruise missile
- Place of origin: United States

Service history
- Used by: United States Air Force

Specifications
- Mass: 2,700 pounds (1,200 kg)
- Length: 14 feet (4.3 m)
- Warhead: W69 thermonuclear
- Blast yield: 200 kilotonnes of TNT (840 TJ)
- Engine: Marquardt rocket/ramjet
- Operational range: 300 miles (480 km)
- Maximum speed: Mach 4.5+, test-flown to Mach 5.5
- Guidance system: Inertial + passive antiradiation and active radar homing for air-to-air mode

The Advanced Strategic Air-Launched Missile (ASALM) was a medium-range strategic missile program, developed in the late 1970s for the United States Air Force. Intended for use in both the air-to-surface and anti-AWACS roles, the missile's development reached the stage of propulsion-system tests before being cancelled in 1980.

== Design and development ==
Development of the Advanced Strategic Air-Launched Missile was initiated in 1976. The ASALM was intended to replace the AGM-69 SRAM in United States Air Force service, providing improved speed and range over the earlier missile, as well as improved performance against hardened targets. In addition, the requirement specified that the ASALM should be capable of operating in a secondary air-to-air mode against AWACS radar-warning aircraft. Martin Marietta and McDonnell Douglas submitted proposals for the contract, the former's design using a Marquardt propulsion system; the latter's, one developed by United Technologies Corporation; the Martin Marietta design was favored by the Air Force

The size of ASALM was limited by the requirement that it use the same launchers as the earlier SRAM. The missile would be steered by small fins at the tail, but lacked wings; the shape of the body combined with the high flight speed were to provide sufficient lift.

Guidance was planned to be provided during mid-course flight by an inertial navigation system, while terminal guidance would use a dual-mode seeker. Propulsion would be provided by an integrated rocket-ramjet, which would act as a solid-fuel rocket during boost, with the rocket's casing, following exhaustion of its propellant and the ejection of the rocket nozzle and a fairing covering an air inlet, becoming a combustion chamber for an air-breathing ramjet, which was planned to use Shelldyne-H fuel. The missile was expected to be carried by the B-1 bomber, or alternatively by a developed version of the FB-111.

== Operational history ==
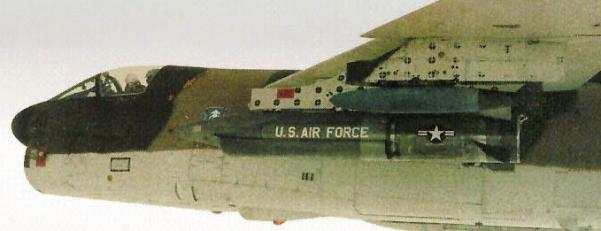
ASALM Propulsion Test Vehicle on an A-7

Starting in October 1979, a series of flight tests of Propulsion Technology Validation missiles, using a Marquardt rocket-ramjet, were conducted. Over the course of seven test firings, a maximum speed of Mach 5.5 at an altitude of 40,000 feet (12,000 m) was achieved.

Despite the successful testing, the ASALM program was suspended following the seventh PTV test flight in May 1980; reductions in the defense budget, combined with the development of the subsonic AGM-86 ALCM, led to the cancellation of the program later that year.

The Martin Marietta ASALM concept was later developed into the AQM-127 SLAT target drone.

== See also ==
- Kh-90
- BrahMos
- Creative Research On Weapons
- Hypersonic Attack Cruise Missile
