= Crow (missile) =

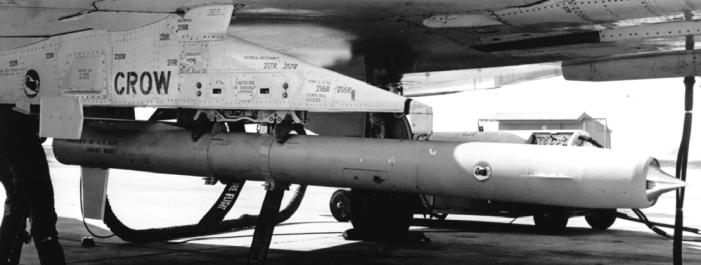
- Guided version of Crow on F-4B Phantom
- Type: Experimental missile
- Place of origin: United States

Service history
- In service: 1961-1965
- Used by: United States Navy

Production history
- Manufacturer: Naval Air Missile Test Center
- No. built: 7

Specifications (Unguided version)
- Mass: 300 pounds (140 kg)
- Length: 9 feet 7 inches (2.91 m)
- Diameter: 8 inches (200 mm)
- Wingspan: 28 inches (710 mm)
- Engine: Rocket-ramjet; rocket, 10,000 lb_{f} (44.5 kN) ramjet, 220 lb_{f} (0.98 kN)
- Propellant: Solid fuel
- Operational range: 97 nautical miles (180 km; 112 mi)
- Maximum speed: Mach 3
- Guidance system: None
- Launch platform: F4D Skyray; F-4 Phantom II

The Creative Research On Weapons or Crow program was an experimental missile project developed by the United States Navy's Naval Air Missile Test Center during the late 1950s. Intended to evaluate the solid-fueled integral rocket/ramjet (SFIRR) method of propulsion as well as solid-fueled ramjet engines, flight tests were conducted during the early 1960s with mixed success.

== Development and RARE ==
Studies of the rocket-ramjet and solid-fueled ramjet concepts began at the U.S. Navy's Naval Air Missile Test Center — later the Naval Missile Center — at Point Mugu, California in 1956, with the intent of increasing the range of small air-to-air missiles through using the combined ramjet and rocket propulsion system with solid fuels only. Following extensive ground testing, the concept was considered promising enough for a flight-test vehicle to be constructed to fully evaluate the new engine.

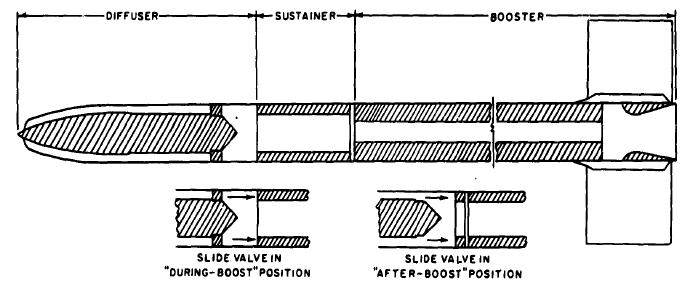
Cutaway drawing of RARE TV-1

The first flight test vehicle, known as Ram Air Rocket Engine or RARE, was developed by the Naval Ordnance Test Station at China Lake, California. RARE was constructed using a conventional five-inch (127mm) rocket tube, 10 feet (3.0 m) in length and weighing 153 pounds (69 kg). Rocket-sled tests conducted during 1956 indicated that the rocket-ramjet configuration would be stable; three flight tests were conducted between 1959 and 1960, with the RARE rocket reaching speeds of Mach 2.3.

== Crow I ==
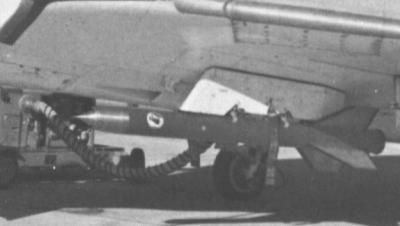
Crow I on F4D Skyray

Even as testing of RARE was undertaken, the Naval Air Missile Test Center was developing their own test vehicle. Known as CROW, or Creative Research on Weapons, the NAMTC vehicle was intended to demonstrate that a solid-fueled rocket-ramjet was capable of delivering a reasonable payload. A simple unguided rocket, the first Crow vehicle, known as Crow I, was intended for aerial launch at low supersonic speed and an altitude of 50,000 feet (15,000 m). After launch, the booster acted as an ordinary solid-fueled rocket; however upon burnout of the booster stage, the rocket's casing acted as the duct for a ramjet engine, with remaining solid fuel being mixed with the incoming air to provide thrust.

The first flight test, from a Douglas F4D Skyray launch aircraft, occurred on January 19, 1961. Due to a flaw in the launch mechanism, the rocket failed to ignite and the test was a failure. Modifications were made, and in November 1961 two successful flights of the Crow I vehicle were conducted.

== Controlled Crow ==
With the ballistic Crow I having proved the propulsion concept sound, follow-up work on a modification of the vehicle to provide guidance was undertaken. The missile was fitted with a simple autopilot, utilizing infrared horizon-scanning to maintain the missile's attitude in flight.

Captive flight tests of Crow began in February 1963 aboard an F-4B Phantom II carrier aircraft; on May 29, the first test launch was attempted, with three further launches taking place through May 1965. None of first three attempted flights were successful, however; malfunctions in the rocket motor, autopilot, and controls plagued the program. The fourth flight test proved more successful, and Crow was considered to have met the project goals.

The Crow project successfully established the solid-fueled rocket-ramjet as a viable method of propulsion. Consideration was also given for use of Crow as an air-to-air missile or target drone, but this was not pursued.

== See also ==
- Solid Fuel Ducted Ramjet
- ASALM
- AQM-127 SLAT
- BrahMos
