= Amy Buckner Chowdhry =

American entrepreneur, philanthropist, and UX research pioneer

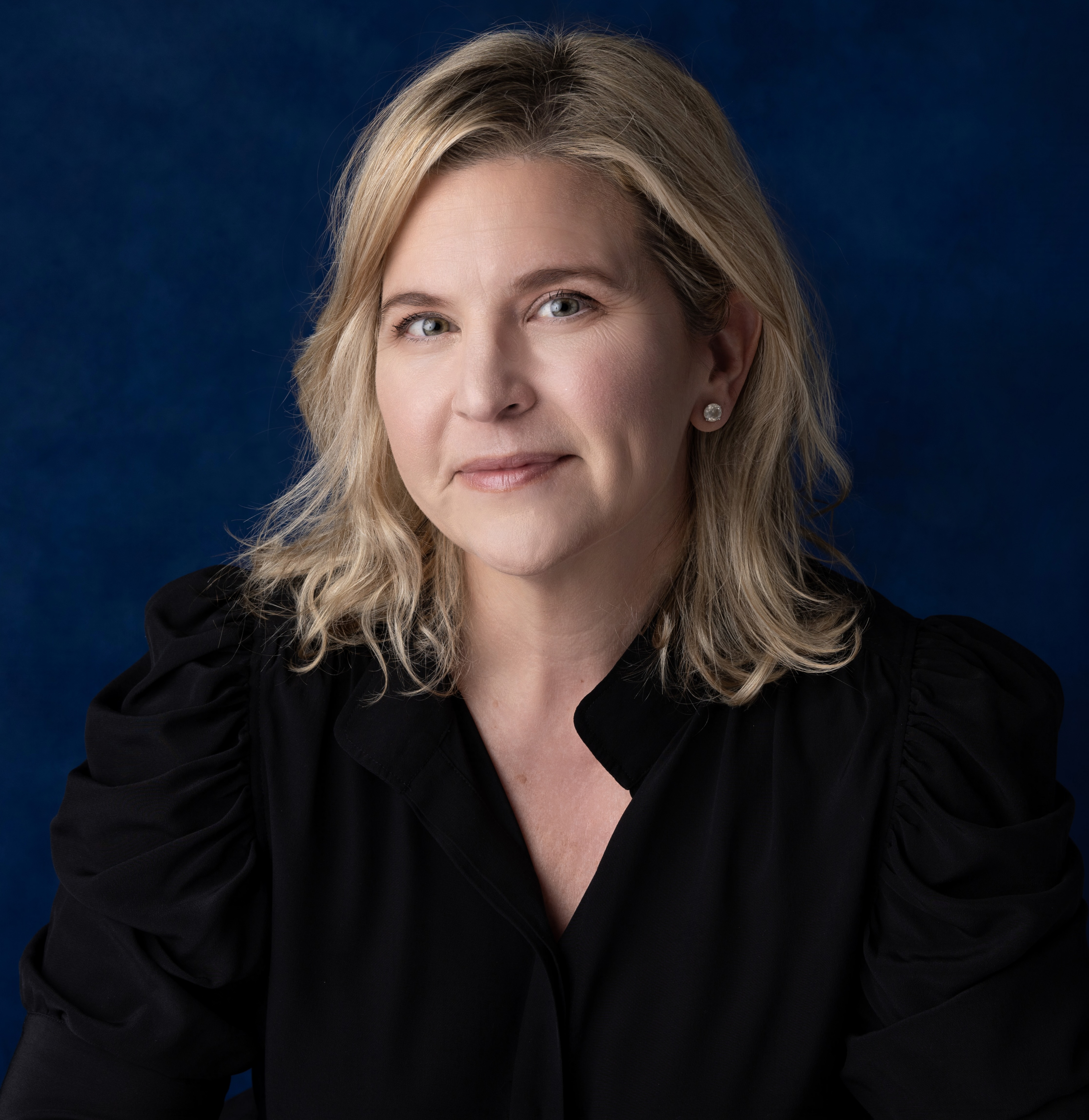
- Buckner Chowdhry in 2024
- Born: Knoxville, Tennessee
- Education: Vanderbilt University
- Occupation: Founder of AnswerLab
- Awards: Fortune, 10 Most Promising Women Entrepreneurs; Ernst & Young, EY Entrepreneurial Winning Women; Inc., Female Founders 200 (2023); San Francisco Business Times, Forever Influential Women; Watermark, Top 10 Women Who Made Their Mark; Vanderbilt Student Media Hall of Fame

Amy Buckner Chowdhry (née Buckner; born in Knoxville, Tennessee) is an American entrepreneur and philanthropist. She is the founder of AnswerLab, a user experience (UX) research firm.

== Early life and education ==
Buckner Chowdhry was born and raised in Knoxville, Tennessee. She earned a Bachelor of Arts in English and East Asian Studies (including Japanese) from Vanderbilt University, graduating magna cum laude and inducted into Phi Beta Kappa. After Vanderbilt, she spent three years in Muroran, Hokkaido, Japan working with the Ministry of Education and later for St. Benedict's High School.

== Career ==
=== AnswerLab ===
In 2004, she founded AnswerLab, serving as its CEO until 2024 before transitioning to board chair. Under her leadership, the firm partnered with Google, Amazon, Facebook (Meta), American Express, Wells Fargo, and FedEx to help enhance products through research-driven insights. During her time as CEO of AnswerLab, she prioritized inclusivity and a high-quality work environment. Under her leadership, AnswerLab developed the "Human-Centered Work Project."

Under her leadership, AnswerLab also secured a growth investment from Shamrock Capital in September 2022.

AnswerLab received multiple accolades under her tenure:

- Named to Fortune's 25 Best Companies to Work For three years in a row.
- Featured on Inc. 500/5000 and San Francisco Business Times' Top 100 fastest growing companies for seven consecutive years

=== Later career and philanthropy ===
After stepping down as CEO in 2024, Amy became board chair of AnswerLab and turned her focus to philanthropy in her native East Tennessee.

Her initiatives center around:

- Financially supporting women-led organizations that are focused on improving lives for women in Tennessee through the Tennessee Women's Catalyst Grant which she founded
- Bringing access to medical specialists in rural healthcare deserts through the Maven Project
- Childhood trauma prevention via partnership with New Hope Children's Advocacy Center in Blount County, Tennessee.
- Food security and organic farming, including the establishment of Full Belly Farm in Walland, Tennessee.
- Environmental education through collaborations with organizations like the Great Smoky Mountain Institute at Tremont

== Public speaking ==
Post AnswerLab's transaction with Shamrock, Amy has spoken on topics such as entrepreneurship, finding the right partner for exit, and leading/scaling an organization with your personal values at BrainTrust Live, Kayo Private Equity Conference, and PEI Women in Private Markets Summit North America.

While leading AnswerLab, Amy frequently spoke at industry events (e.g., Web Summit, Forrester CX, RISE, UXPA International, UX STRAT) and contributed to thought leadership in UX, DEI, and human centered work. She has written for Entrepreneur, Inc. and UXmatters.

== Selected publications & interviews ==
- Podcast: Growth Unscripted (2021), discussing inclusivity, scaling UX, and remote research.
- Interview: More Than Lip Service: DEI in Private Equity (2023)
