= Kh-31 =

Soviet/Russian air-to-surface missile

Kh-31 (NATO reporting name: AS-17 'Krypton')
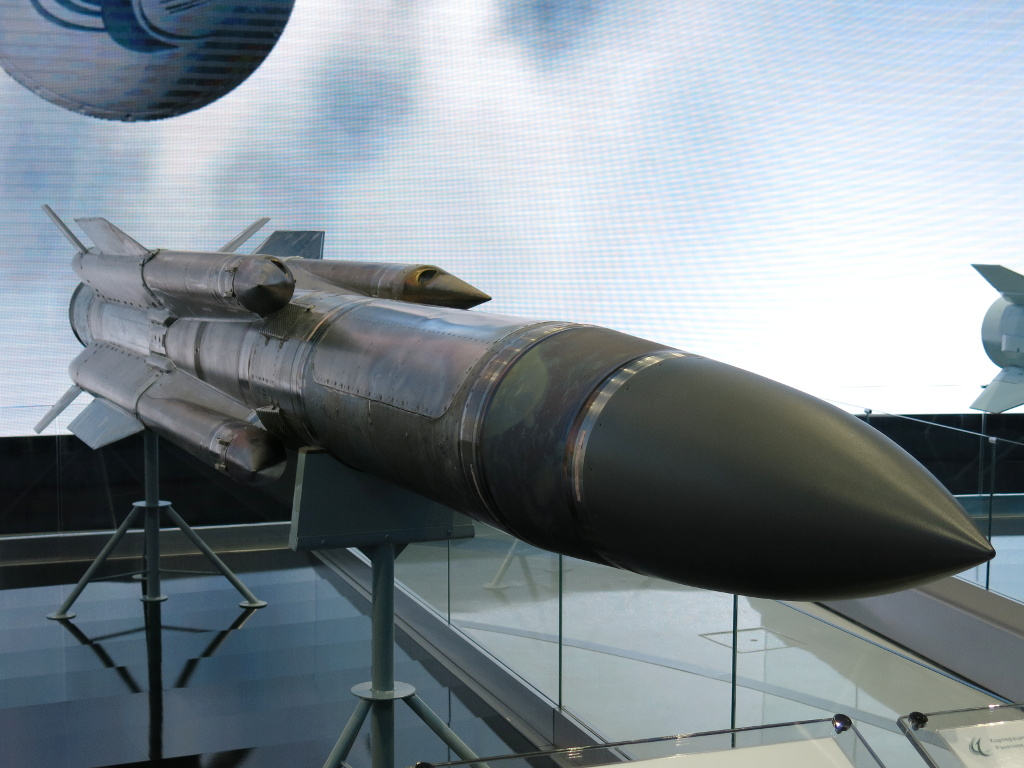
- A mock-up in 2018.
- Type: Anti-radiation missile (Kh-31P); Anti-ship missile (Kh-31A)
- Place of origin: Soviet Union

Service history
- In service: 1988–present
- Used by: Russia, Serbia, China, India, Algeria, Egypt
- Wars: Russo-Georgian War (alleged); Russo-Ukrainian War; Russo-Ukrainian war

Production history
- Manufacturer: Tactical Missiles Corporation (Zvezda-Strela before 2002)
- Unit cost: $550,000 (2010)
- Produced: 1982

Specifications
- Mass: Kh-31A :610 kg (1,340 lb); Kh-31P :600 kg (1,320 lb)
- Length: Mod 1 : 4.7 m (15 ft 5 in); Mod 2 (AD/PD) : 5.3 m (17 ft 5 in)
- Diameter: 360 mm (14 in)
- Wingspan: 914 mm (36.0 in)
- Warhead: Penetrating, armor-piercing.(Kh-31A); HE shaped charge
- Warhead weight: Kh-31A :94 kg (207 lb); Kh-31P :87 kg (192 lb)
- Detonation mechanism: Impact
- Engine: Solid fuel rocket in initial stage, ramjet for rest of trajectory
- Propellant: Kerosene
- Operational range: Kh-31A: minimum 7.5 km (4.0 nmi) and maximum 70 km (38 nmi); Kh-31P: up to 110 km (60 nmi; 70 mi)
- Maximum speed: Kh-31A/P: 2,160–2,520 km/h (1,340–1,570 mph); MA-31: Mach 2.7 (low), Mach 3.5 (high)
- Guidance system: Kh-31A: inertial guidance with active radar homing Kh-31P: inertial with passive radar
- Launch platform: Both : Su-27SM, Su-30MKI, Su-25, Su-34, Su-35, MiG-29M, HAL Tejas, MiG-29K, Su-24M; Kh-31A only : Su-33

The Kh-31 (Russian: Х-31; AS-17 'Krypton') is a Soviet and Russian air-to-surface missile carried by aircraft such as the MiG-29, Su-35 and the Su-57. It is capable of Mach 3.5 and was the first supersonic anti-ship missile that could be launched by tactical aircraft.

There are several variants; the Kh-31 is best known as an anti-radiation missile (ARM) but there are also anti-ship and target drone versions. There has been talk of adapting it to make an "AWACS killer", a long-range air-to-air missile.

== Development ==
The proliferation of surface-to-air missiles (SAMs) has made the Suppression of Enemy Air Defences (SEAD) a priority for any modern air force intending offensive action. Knocking out air search radars and fire control radars is an essential part of this mission. ARMs must have sufficient range that the launch platform is out of range of the SAMs, high speed to reduce the risk of being shot down and a seeker that can detect a range of radar types, but they do not need a particularly big warhead.

The Soviet Union's first ARM was developed by the Raduga OKB engineering group responsible for the Soviet Union's missiles for heavy bombers. The Kh-22P was developed from the 6-tonne Kh-22 (AS-4 "Kitchen") missile. Experience gained with this led in 1973 to the Kh-28 (AS-9 "Kyle") carried by tactical aircraft such as the Su-7B, Su-17 and Su-24. It had Mach 3 capability and a 120 km (60 nmi) range, greater than the contemporary AGM-78 Standard ARM. The Kh-28 was succeeded by the Kh-58 in 1978, which has similar speed and range but replaces the dual-fuel rocket motor with a much safer RDTT solid propellant.

The development of more sophisticated SAMs such as the MIM-104 Patriot and the US Navy's Aegis combat system put pressure on the Soviets to develop better ARMs in turn. Zvezda came at the problem from a different angle to Raduga, having a background in lightweight air-to-air missiles. However, in the mid-1970s they had developed the successful Kh-25 family of short-range air-to-surface missiles, including the Kh-25MP (AS-12 "Kegler") for anti-radar use. Zvezda started work on a long-range ARM and the first launch of the Kh-31 was in 1982. It entered service in 1988 and was first displayed in public in 1991, the Kh-31P at Dubai and the Kh-31A at Minsk.

In December 1997 it was reported that a small number of Kh-31s had been delivered to China, but that "production had yet to begin". It was around this time that the Russians sold Su-30MKK 'Flanker-G' aircraft to the Chinese. It seems that the original deliveries were of the original Russian model designated as X-31, to allow testing while the KR-1 model was being developed for licence production. Local production may have started by July 2005.

Russian development has accelerated since Zvezda was subsumed into the Tactical Missiles Corporation in 2002, with the announcement of the 'D' extended range models and the 'M' model mid-life updates (see Variants section below).

== Design ==
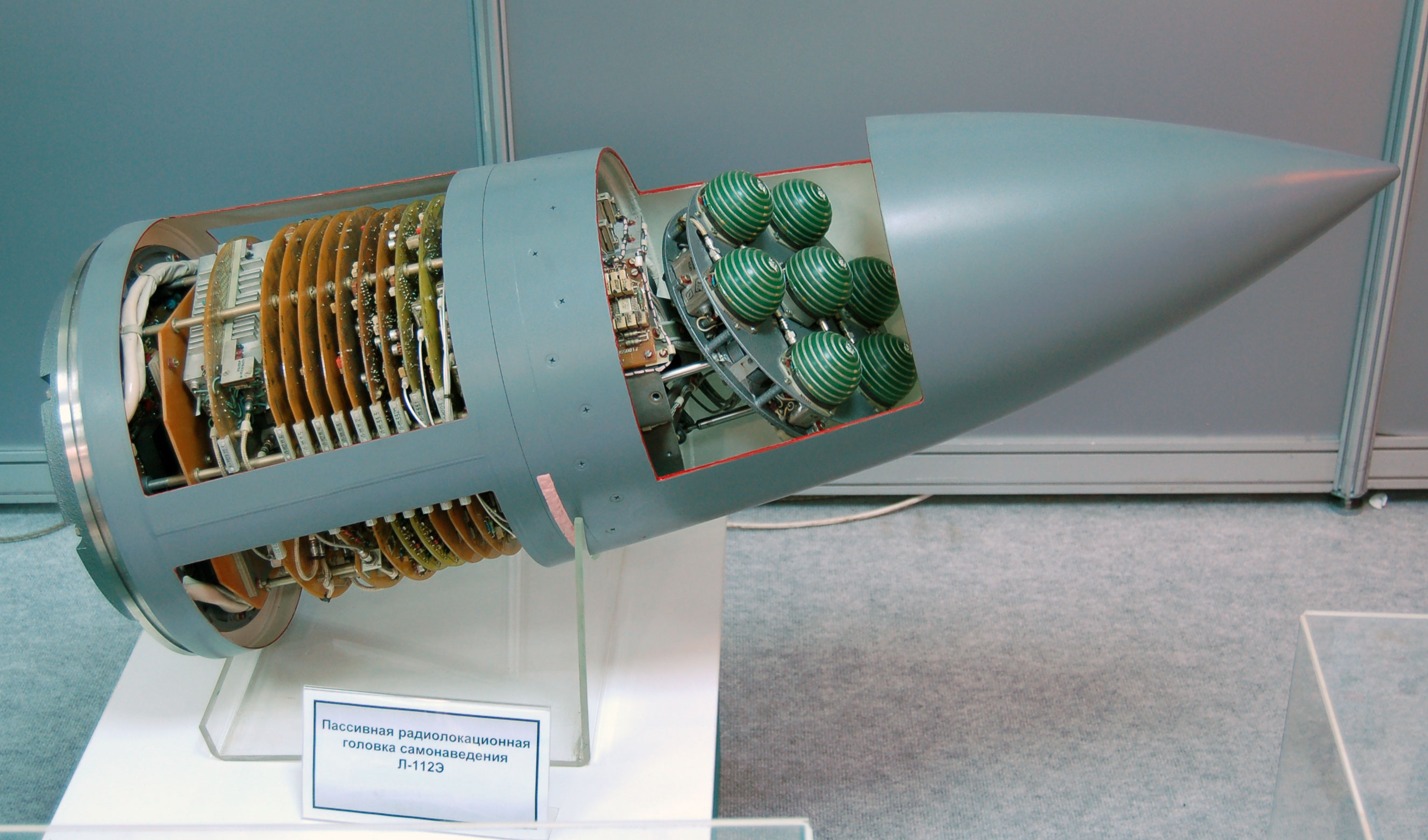
L112E seeker

In many respects the Kh-31 is a miniaturised version of the P-270 Moskit (SS-N-22 'Sunburn') and was reportedly designed by the same man. The missile is conventionally shaped, with cruciform wings and control surfaces made from titanium. The two-stage propulsion is notable. On launch, a solid-fuel booster in the tail accelerates the missile to Mach 1.8 and the motor is discarded. Then four air intakes open up and, as in the Franco-German ANS/ANF, the empty rocket case becomes the combustion chamber of a kerosene-fuelled ramjet, which takes it beyond Mach 4.

The L-111E seeker of the anti-radar version has a unique antenna, an interferometer array of seven spiral antennas on a steerable platform. The seekers delivered to China in 2001-2 were 106.5 cm (41.9 in) long, 36 cm (14 in) in diameter, and weighed 23 kg (51 lb).

== Operational history ==
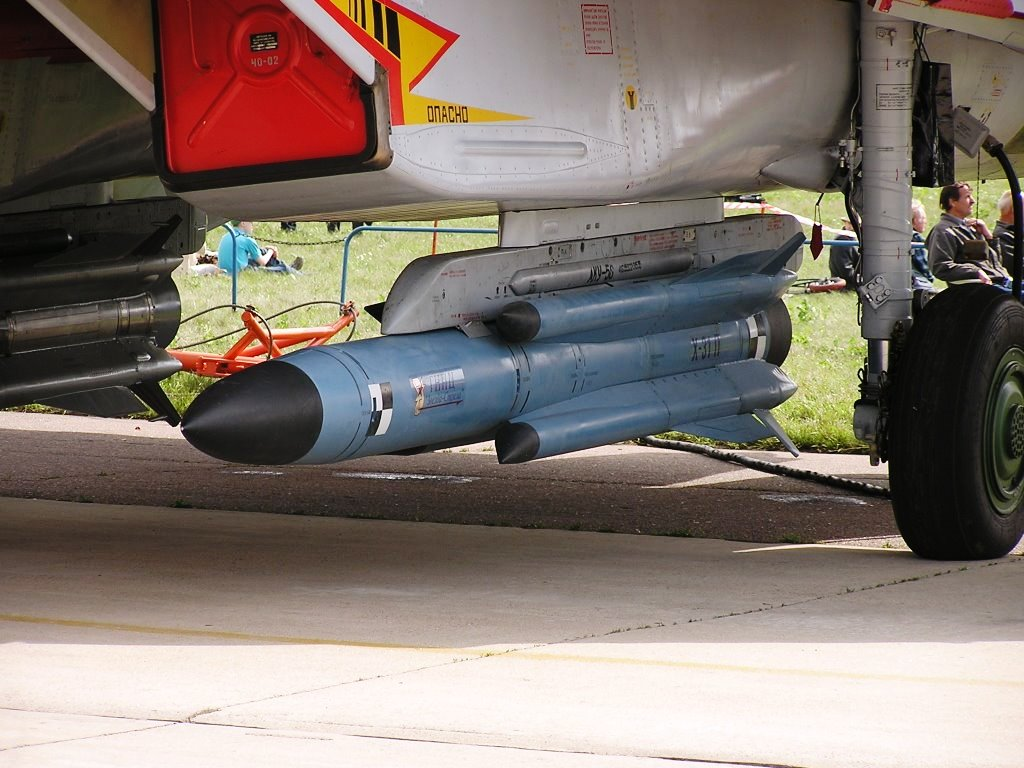
A Kh-31P possibly under a Sukhoi Su-30 in 2003

The Kh-31P ARM entered service in the Soviet Union in 1988 and the Kh-31A anti-shipping version in 1989. Unlike its predecessors, it can be fitted to almost any of Russia's tactical aircraft, from the Su-17 to MiG-31.

In 2001 India bought Kh-31s for its Su-30MKI; they appear to have bought 60 Kh-31A and 90 Kh-31P. A few Kh-31P/KR-1's were delivered to China in 1997 but these were apparently for testing and development work. The Chinese ordered Russian missiles in late 2002 or early 2003, leading to 200 KR-1's in their inventory by 2005; the Chinese press reported in July 2005 that Su-30MKK's of the 3rd Air Division had been equipped with the missiles.

The US Navy bought MA-31 target drones. An $18.468-million order for thirty-four MA-31 was placed in 1999, but this order was blocked by the Russians. The MA-31 was launched from an F-4 Phantom, and work was done on a kit to launch it from an F-16.

According to some reports, the missile was used by the Russian Air Force during the South Ossetian conflict in 2008. In particular, it was reported that on August 10, 2008 a Russian Air Force Su-34 struck a Georgian air defense radar near the city of Gori with Kh-31Ps. Georgian air defenses were disabled in order to avoid further losses.

The Kh-31 was used by Russia during the Russian invasion of Ukraine. According to senior sources of the Ukrainian Air Force, some 9K33 Osa and 9K37 Buk systems were destroyed by Kh-31P and Kh-58 missiles during the war. On 3 March 2022 Kh-31 launched from a Russian aircraft sank the Ukrainian patrol vessel Sloviansk.

== Variants ==
- Kh-31A - is a supersonic anti-ship missile with an active radar seeker to be used against vessels up to 4,500 tons. The missile has a minimum range of 7.5 kilometres (4.0 nmi) and maximum range of 70 kilometres (38 nmi). Missile is sea-skimming as it approaches the target. The missile uses a penetrating warhead.
- Kh-31P (Type 77P) - passive radiation seeker head for use as an anti-radiation missile. Stays at high altitude throughout its flight, allowing higher speeds and increasing range to 110 km (60 nmi; 70 mi). The Kh-31P missile comes in three variants, each optimized against a different set of radiation sources, typically targeting enemy surface-to-air missile systems.
- Kh-31PM - modernized version of the Kh-31P with increased range and new multi-band L-130 seeker sensor
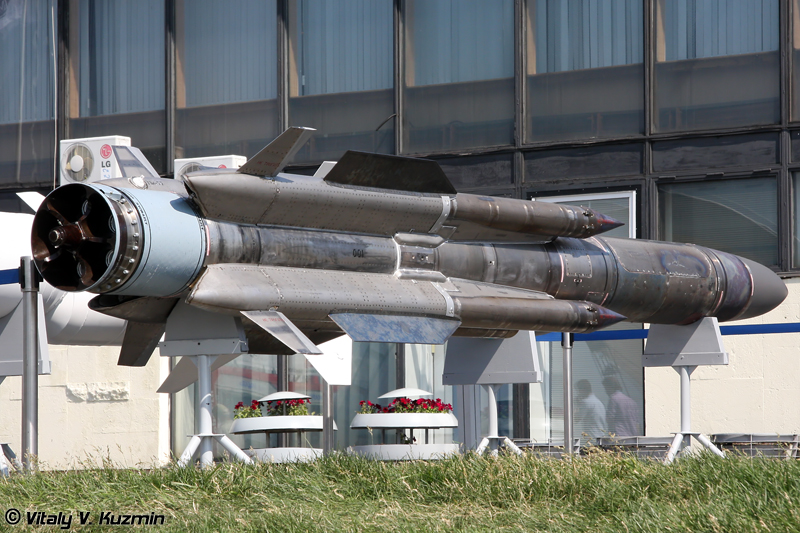
  Rear view of a Kh-31AD
- Kh-31AD/Kh-31PD ("Kh-31 Mod 2") - increase range through increasing the fuselage from 4.70 m (15 ft 5 in) to 5.3 m (17 ft 5 in) long. As of 2012, the Kh-31PD is serially produced. Kh-31AD is in series production since 2013.
- Kh-31PK - installed non-contact fuse, maximum speed 900 m/s, range 120–160 km. Destined for Su-27SM, Su-30MK, Su-35. In serial production since 2009.
- MA-31 - telemetry and other systems installed by McDonnell Douglas/Boeing for use by the US Navy as a target drone. Tested between 1996 and 2007; a version upgraded with GPS, the MA-31PG, was offered to the Navy as a replacement for the MQM-8 Vandal but they bought the GQM-163 Coyote. Even with the additional equipment, the MA-31 was capable of Mach 2.7 and 15G manoeuvres in its anti-ship (sea-skimming) flight profile and Mach 3.5 in ARM mode at 48,000 ft (15,000 m).
- KR-1 - version of the Kh-31P exported to China in 1997. It seems that Zvezda wanted to sell an initial batch of KR-1's to China, before the KR-1 went into production in China. Rather than the original three seeker modules, the KR-1 has a single K-112E "export" seeker targeting D-F band (S band) emissions, and reportedly optimised for specific Taiwanese radars.
- YJ-91 Ying Ji 91 - Chinese missile based on the Kh-31P. They are also reported to have developed an anti-shipping version with an indigenous active seeker, and are looking to develop this for use in submarines. The name YJ-91 was already in use by 1997, and may have been a Chinese name for the original Russian missiles designated X-31 by the Russians. By 2005, the name YJ-93 was being applied to missiles made in China, but Western reports generally do not distinguish between YJ-91 and YJ-93.

An active/passive air-to-air version for use against slow-moving support aircraft, a so-called "AWACS killer", was announced at the 1992 Moscow air show with 200 km (110 nmi; 120 mi) range. That would be less than the 300–400 kilometres (160–220 nmi; 190–250 mi) promised by the Vympel R-37 (AA-13 'Axehead') and Novator R-172 missiles, but a Kh-31 derivative could be carried by a wider range of aircraft. However this may have been mere propaganda; in 2004 the Tactical Missiles Corporation "emphatically denied" that it had ever worked on an air-to-air version of the Kh-31. In 2005 rumours emerged of a Russian "AWACS-killer missile" based on the Kh-31A anti-shipping model, and of the Chinese adapting the YJ-91, derived from the Kh-31P, for the same purpose. In 2017, a representative of the Mikoyan company claimed that an air-to-air variant of the Kh-31 was in development, intended to equip the MiG-35, but this is not confirmed.

== Operators ==
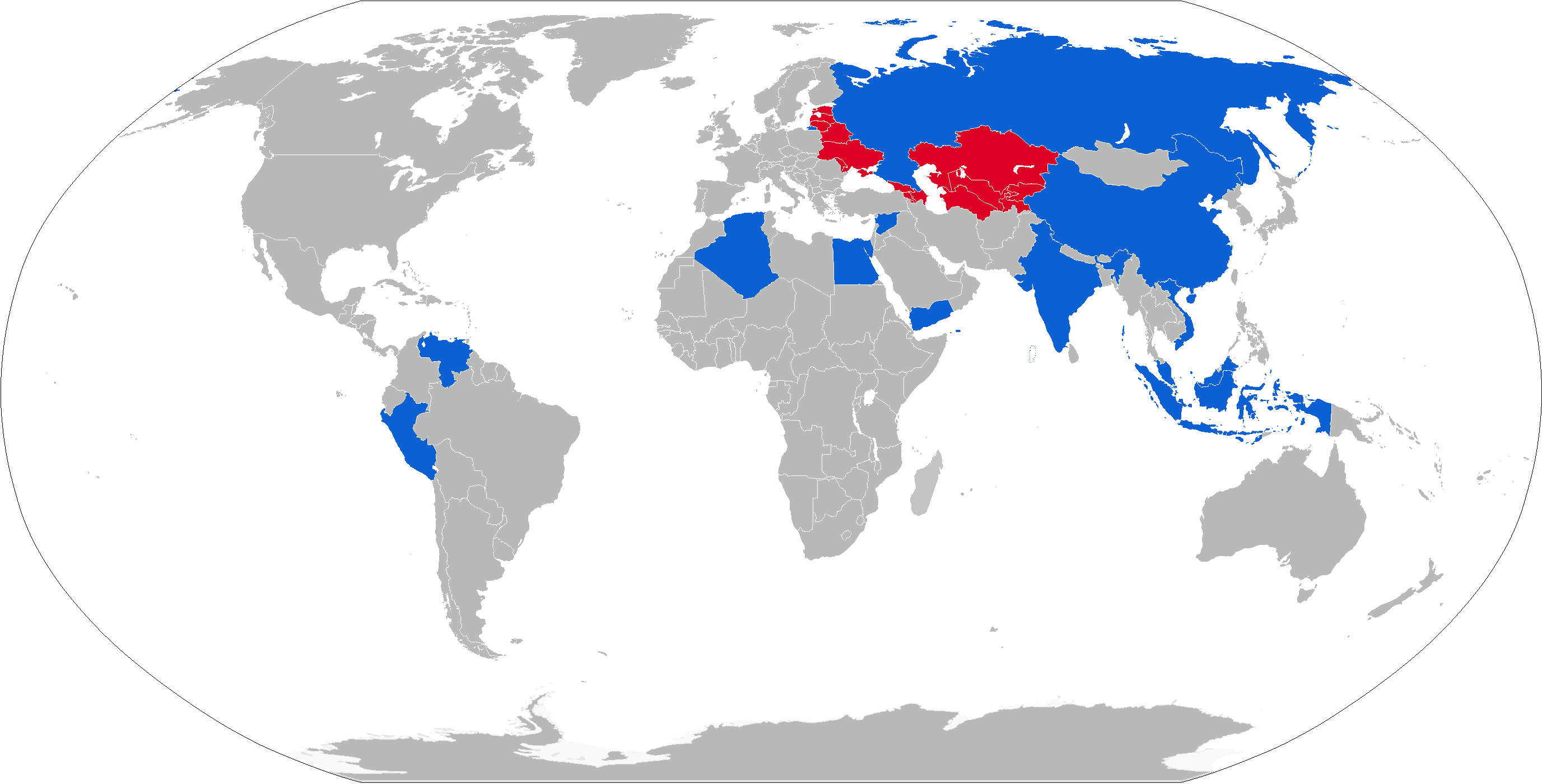
Map with Kh-31 operators in blue

=== Current operators ===
- Algeria – 125 delivered in 2007–2009
- China
- Egypt
- Indonesia
- India – Ordered Kh-31P missiles in 2019
- Malaysia – 150
- Russia – 222 delivered in 2009–2010
- Serbia – Kh-31P
- Syria – 87 delivered in 2008–2010
- Venezuela
- Vietnam
- Yemen - Kh-31P, Kh-31A

=== Potential operators ===
- Bangladesh – In January 2021, the Bangladesh Air Force floated a tender for the procurement of Kh-31A missiles for MiG-29B aircraft.

=== Former operators ===
- United States - unknown number purchased from the Soviet Union
- Soviet Union

== See also ==
- DRDO Anti-Radiation Missile
- YJ-91 - Chinese missile based on Kh-31
- P-270 Moskit (SS-N-22 'Sunburn')
- AGM-88 HARM - main US ARM
- ALARM missile - British ARM with loiter capability
- MAR-1 - Brazilian ARM project
- AGM-136 Tacit Rainbow - US ARM cancelled in 1991

== Sources ==
- Gordon, Yefim (2004), Soviet/Russian Aircraft Weapons Since World War Two, Hinckley, England: Midland Publishing, ISBN 1-85780-188-1
