= Martin Marietta =

American manufacturing company (1961–1995)

Martin Marietta Corporation
- Industry: Manufacturing
- Predecessors: Glenn L. Martin Company; American-Marietta Corporation
- Founded: 1961; 65 years ago
- Defunct: 1995; 31 years ago
- Fate: Merged with Lockheed Corporation
- Successors: Lockheed Martin; Martin Marietta Materials
- Headquarters: Bethesda, Maryland, United States
- Key people: Hans Multhopp

The Martin Marietta Corporation was an American company founded in 1961 through the merger of Glenn L. Martin Company and American-Marietta Corporation. In 1995, it merged with Lockheed Corporation to form Lockheed Martin.

== History ==
Martin Marietta formed in 1961 by the merger of the Glenn L. Martin Company and American-Marietta Corporation.

Martin, based in Baltimore, was primarily an aerospace concern with a recent focus on missiles, namely its Titan program. This program was established in 1955 when the company secured the U.S. Air Force contract to build the country's second intercontinental ballistic missile (ICBM). American-Marietta was headquartered in Chicago and produced paints, dyes, metallurgical products, construction materials, and other goods.

In 1982, Martin Marietta was subject to a hostile takeover bid by the Bendix Corporation, headed by William Agee. Bendix bought the majority of Martin Marietta shares and in effect owned the company. However, Martin Marietta's management used the short time separating ownership and control to sell non-core businesses and launch its own hostile takeover of Bendix (known as the Pac-Man defense). Thomas G. Pownall, CEO of Martin Marietta, was successful and the end of this extraordinarily bitter battle saw Martin Marietta survive; Bendix was bought by Allied Corporation.

In July 1993 CEO Norman Augustine participated in what he called the "Last Supper", where Les Aspin and William Perry disclosed to a number of prime contractors that, because the Cold War had drawn to a successful conclusion, the defense industry would shrink and the Department of Defense had no need for the plethora of them. The flurry of mergers in this industry over the next decade can be traced to this event, including his company's merger with Lockheed.

=== Timeline ===
- 1961: Martin Marietta formed by merger of the Glenn L. Martin Company and American-Marietta Corporation
- 1963: Martin Marietta starts building floating nuclear power plant MH-1A as part of the Army Nuclear Power Program
- 1969: Martin Marietta commissioned to build the Mark IV monorail used on the Walt Disney World Monorail System between 1971 and 1989
- 1971: Martin Marietta loses landmark sex discrimination suit before the Supreme Court, in Phillips v. Martin Marietta Corp.
- 1975: Acquires Hoskyns Group (UK IT services company)
- 1982: Bendix Corporation's attempted takeover ends in its own sale to Allied Corporation; Martin Marietta survives
- 1986: Wins contract to convert Titan II ICBMs into space launch vehicles. The Martin Company built the original ICBMs
- 1987: Electronics & Missiles Group formed, headquartered in Orlando
- 1991: Electronics & Missiles Group reorganized into the Electronics, Information & Missiles Group
- 1993: Acquires GE Aerospace for 3 billion USD, allowing combined marketing of complementary systems, e.g. Martin Marietta's Titan missiles launching GE Aerospace's satellites. The acquisition turned Martin Marietta into the world's largest military electronics firm.
- 1993: Acquires management contract for Sandia National Laboratories
- 1993: Acquires General Dynamics' Space Systems Division, maker of the Atlas family of launch vehicles
- 1994: Martin Marietta completed its initial public offering of 19% of the common stock of Martin Marietta Materials, which is listed on the New York Stock Exchange as MLM
- 1995: Martin Marietta merged with Lockheed Corporation to form Lockheed Martin
- 1996: Lockheed Martin splits off Martin Marietta Materials as a separate and independent entity

== Products ==
=== Aircraft ===
- Martin X-23 PRIME
- Martin Marietta X-24A
- Martin Marietta X-24B

=== Missiles and rockets ===
- AGM-12 Bullpup
- AGM-62 Walleye
- Titan (rocket family)
  - HGM-25A Titan I
  - LGM-25C Titan II
  - Titan IIIA
  - Titan IIIB
  - Titan IIIC
  - Commercial Titan III
  - Titan IIID
  - Titan IIIE
  - Titan IV
  - Titan 23G
  - Titan 34D
- M712 Copperhead
- MGM-31 Pershing
- Pershing II (orders started in 1978)
- MGM-51 Shillelagh
- MGM-118 Peacekeeper
- MGM-134 Midgetman
- FGM-148 Javelin
- AGR-14 ZAP
- ASALM
- Sprint (missile)
- Atlas (rocket family)
  - Atlas I
  - Atlas II

=== Spacecraft ===
- Magellan (spacecraft)
- Mars Polar Lander
- Viking program
  - Viking 1
  - Viking 2
- Wind (spacecraft)
- Lacrosse (satellite)

=== Unmanned aerial vehicles ===
- Martin Marietta Model 845
- AQM-127 SLAT

=== Significant components of vehicles ===
- Space Shuttle external tank

== Leadership ==
=== President ===
- George Maverick Bunker, 1962–1972
- J. Donald Rauth, 1972–1977
- Thomas G. Pownall, 1977–1979
- Frank X. Bradley, 1979–1980
- Thomas G. Pownall, 1980–1983
- Laurence J. Adams, 1983–1986
- Norman R. Augustine, 1986–

=== Chairman of the Board ===
- Grover M. Hermann, 1962–1966
- George M. Bunker, 1973–1977
- J. Donald Rauth, 1977–1983
- Thomas G. Pownall, 1983–

== See also ==
- List of monorail systems
