= American-Marietta Corporation =

Defunct American industrial conglomerate (1940–1961)

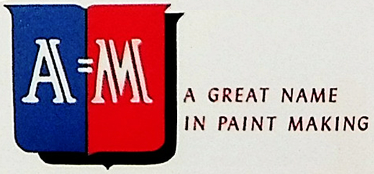
- Industry: Manufacturing
- Predecessor: American Asphalt Paint Company; Marietta Paint and Color Company
- Founded: 1940
- Defunct: 1961
- Fate: Merged with the Glenn L. Martin Company to form Martin Marietta
- Successor: Martin Marietta
- Headquarters: Chicago, Illinois

The American-Marietta Corporation was an American industrial conglomerate based in Chicago, Illinois, with numerous subsidiary companies across the continental United States. It specialized in construction materials and industrial chemicals such as synthetic resins, adhesives, paints, and varnishes and was a former constituent of the Fortune 500.

== History ==
It was originally founded in 1913 as the American Asphalt Paint Company by Grover M. Hermann of Callicoon, New York, and his business partner Charles Phelan, who was killed in an automobile accident in 1931.

In 1940, the company merged with the Marietta Paint and Color Company of Marietta, Ohio, to become American-Marietta, with Hermann as president and director. The company entered the Fortune 500 in 1955 at #257. By 1960, the company's total income was $372 million and had reached #137.

At 70, Grover Hermann sought to retire. After negotiations in 1960 with George M. Bunker, chairman of the Glenn L. Martin Company, an agreement was made to merge American-Marietta with Martin. The two companies formally merged in October 1961 to form Martin Marietta, with Hermann becoming Chairman of the Board of the new company until his retirement in 1975. He died in 1979. In 1995 Martin Marietta went on to merge with Lockheed Corporation to form Lockheed Martin.

In 1959, American-Marietta acquired Superior Stone, an aggregates company founded in Raleigh, North Carolina. After the merger with Martin, the aggregates division continued as Martin Marietta Materials, Inc.. In 1996, following Martin's merger with Lockheed, Martin Marietta Inc. was spun off as a wholly independent company currently trading as Martin Marietta Materials.
