= Martin Marietta Materials =

American materials company

Martin Marietta Materials, Inc.
- Type: Public
- Traded as: NYSE: MLM; S&P 500 component
- Industry: Construction materials
- Founded: 1993; 33 years ago
- Headquarters: Raleigh, North Carolina, U.S.
- Key people: C. Nye (President & CEO); Michael Petro (CFO)
- Revenue: ▲US$6.15 billion (2025)
- Operating income: ▼US$1.44 billion (2025)
- Net income: ▼US$1.14 billion (2025)
- Total assets: ▲US$18.7 billion (2025)
- Total equity: ▲US$10.0 billion (2025)
- Number of employees: 9,600 (2026)
- Website: martinmarietta.com

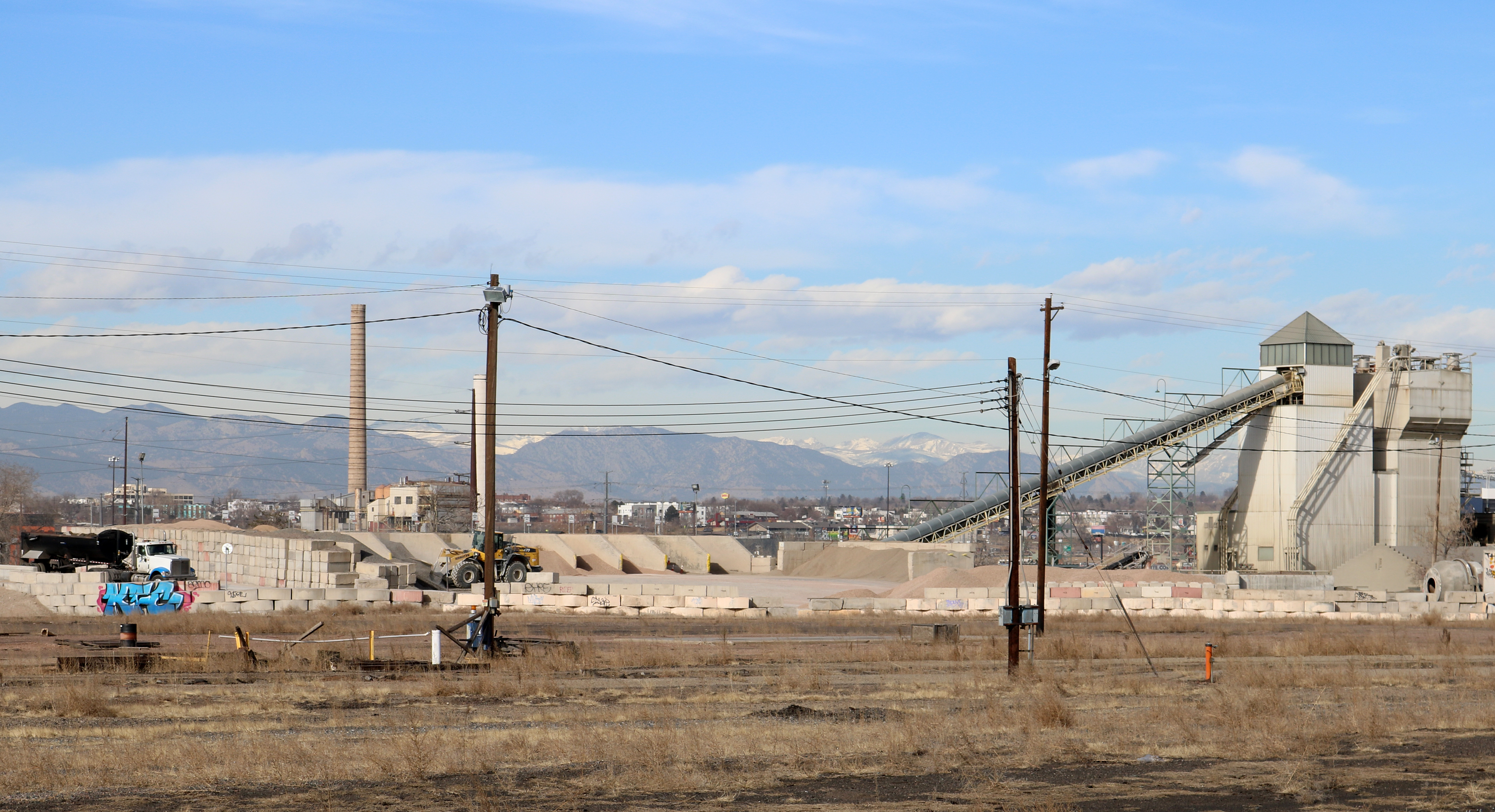
Martin Marietta Materials' Quivas Ready Mix plant in Denver, Colorado

Martin Marietta Materials, Inc. is an American company that supplies aggregates, cement, asphalt, and heavy building materials. It has operations spanning 26 states, Canada, and the Caribbean. In particular, Martin Marietta Materials supplies resources for the construction of roads, sidewalks, and foundations.

== History ==
Superior Stone was an aggregates company founded in 1939 by brothers Willam Trent Ragland and Edmond Ragland. In 1959, Superior Stone, led by William Trent Ragland as president, merged with the American-Marietta Corporation, which merged with the Glenn L. Martin Company a year later to form the Martin Marietta Corporation in 1961. In 1971, Martin Marietta acquired Harvey Aluminum, a company which made aluminum oxide, aluminum ingot and aircraft grade aluminum sheet. William Trent Ragland continued as CEO until 1977, after retiring and becoming Emeritus Senior Vice President. Martin Marietta merged with Lockheed Corporation in 1995, and a year later, Martin Marietta Materials was spun off as an independent company, with Lockheed Martin retaining various aerospace, defense, and other manufacturing lines of business.

In 2014, the company acquired Texas Industries for $2 billion.

Martin Marietta's Magnesia Specialties business provides a full range of magnesium oxide, magnesium hydroxide, and dolomitic lime products.

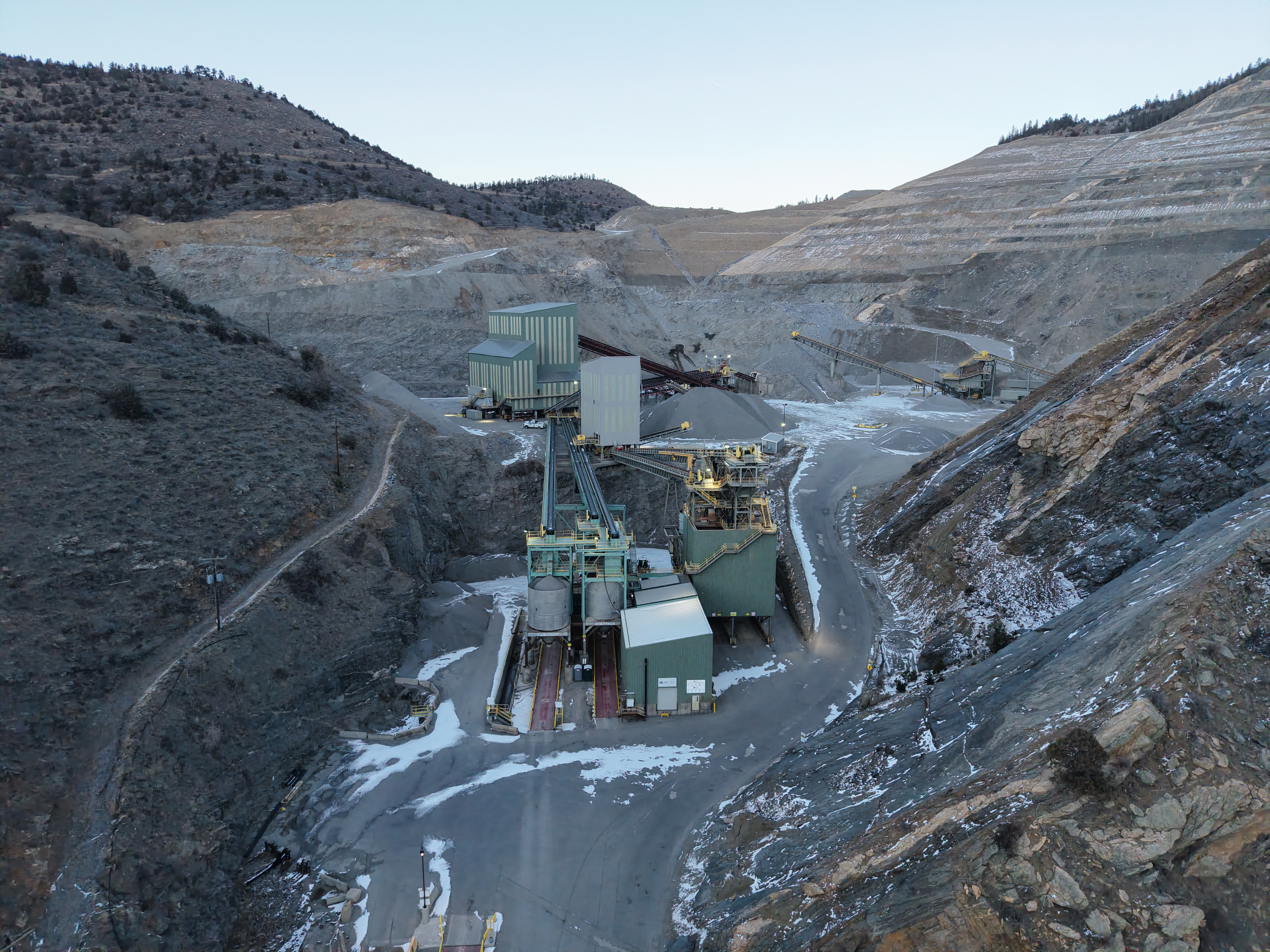
Aerial picture of the Walstrum Quarry as of December, 2025
