= MA-31 =

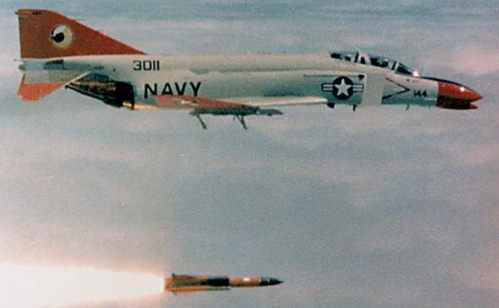
- Type: Target drone
- Place of origin: Russia; United States

Service history
- In service: 1996-2007
- Used by: United States Navy

Production history
- Manufacturer: Boeing, Zvezda-Strela
- No. built: 47

Specifications
- Mass: 1,300 pounds (590 kg)
- Length: 15 ft (4.7 m)
- Diameter: 14.2 inches (360 mm)
- Wingspan: 3.8 ft (1.15 m)
- Engine: Solid fuel rocket in initial stage, ramjet for rest of trajectory
- Operational range: 27 nmi (50 km; 31 mi)
- Maximum speed: Sea level Mach 2.5 (3,060 km/h; 1,900 mph) High altitude Mach 3.1 (3,800 km/h; 2,360 mph)
- Launch platform: QF-4 Phantom II

The MA-31 was a conversion of the Kh-31, an anti-ship missile developed by the Soviet Union during the 1980s, for use as a target drone by the United States Navy. Although the missile proved successful in this role, political complications resulted in the type being only an interim solution, and only a small number of the missiles were acquired.

== Kh-31 development ==
The Kh-31 missile was developed by Zvezda-Strela in the Soviet Union starting in 1977 for service as a long-range anti-ship missile and anti-radiation missile, first being flown in 1982. Derived from the P-270 Moskit missile, the Kh-31 is conventional in shape, and has cruciform fins made from titanium, with a rocket-ramjet propulsion system providing thrust.

== MA-31 history ==
Following the cancellation of the AQM-127 SLAT target drone program, a requirement for a new high-speed target to replace the MQM-8 Vandal still existed. In an unusual turn of events, the U.S. Navy chose to acquire examples of the Kh-31 missile - the actual threat the drone was intended to simulate - as an interim solution pending the development of an all-new design. In 1995, a contract was awarded to McDonnell Douglas for evaluation of the Kh-31 in the Supersonic Sea-Skimming Target role.

An initial small batch of missiles were acquired, being delivered from the manufacturer as "green" shells, without electronics, to Boeing, which had acquired McDonnell Douglas, in the US for modification and conversion to U.S. Navy standards, including the installation of tracking, telemetry and range-safety systems. The MA-31 was equipped for launch from the QF-4 Phantom II aircraft, and it was proposed to develop a compatible launcher for the F-16N Fighting Falcon.

Designated MA-31 in US service, the first launch of the missile took place in August 1996. Evaluated against an improved MQM-8, the MA-31 proved superior and a contract for 34 production missiles was placed in 1999.

At this point, politics intervened in the process, with the Russian Duma refusing export clearance for the missiles. Boeing proposed a further modified version of the missile, with improved GPS-based navigation and guidance system and longer range, however the MA-31 program went no further, and the last missiles in the U.S. Navy's inventory were expended in 2007.

The Navy would finally receive a definitive Supersonic Sea-Skimming Target, replacing the MA-31 and the MQM-8, in the form of the GQM-163 Coyote, which entered service during 2007.

== Design ==
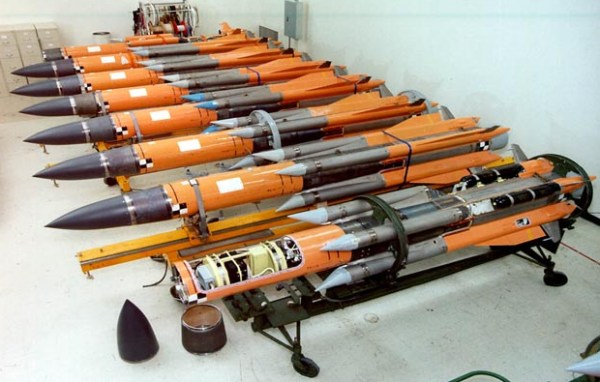
Multiple MA-31 missiles including one being prepared for use

It was powered by an integrated solid-fueled rocket/ramjet propulsion system. After burnout of the rocket, the covers on the four ramjet intakes were jettisoned, and the empty rocket case served as the ramjet's combustion chamber. The missile could reach speeds of Mach 3.1 (3,800 km/h; 2,360 mph) at high-altitude and Mach 2.5 (3,060 km/h; 1,900 mph) at sea level.
