= AGR-14 ZAP =

XAGR-14A
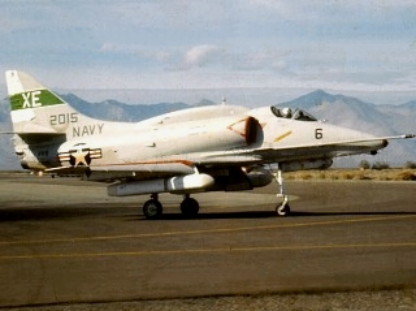
- ZAP rocket pods on an A-4 Skyhawk
- Type: Air-to-surface rocket
- Place of origin: United States

Service history
- Used by: United States Navy

Production history
- Designed: 1967-1970
- Manufacturer: Martin Marietta

Specifications
- Mass: 170 pounds (77 kg)
- Length: 8 feet 9.5 inches (2.680 m)
- Diameter: 6 inches (150 mm)
- Wingspan: 14 inches (360 mm)
- Warhead: Flechette
- Engine: Thiokol Mk 67
- Propellant: Solid fuel
- Maximum speed: Mach 3
- Guidance system: None
- Launch platform: A-4 Skyhawk

The AGR-14 ZAP was an air-to-surface unguided rocket developed by the United States Navy in the late 1960s. Intended for use in the suppression of enemy air defenses role, the rocket reached the flight-testing stage before being cancelled.

== Design and development ==
A requirement for a new type of unguided rocket, to be used to suppress enemy anti-aircraft artillery batteries, was identified by the United States Navy in 1966. Given the name HART, (which stands for Hypervelocity Aircraft Rocket, Tactical), the new rocket was intended to replace the FFAR and Zuni rockets that were then in service.

HART was intended to be a high-acceleration, high-velocity rocket for launch from aircraft. The increased speed of the rocket as opposed to those then in service – intended to reach or exceed Mach 3 – was intended to remove the possibility that a high-speed aircraft might overtake its own weapons after launch, as well as improving the rocket's accuracy through providing a flatter trajectory, and reduction in its flight time. Six inches (152 mm) in diameter, HART would be powered by a solid-fueled rocket, and would use flechette anti-personnel warheads to provide the greatest possible effect against the intended targets.

== Development and cancellation ==
In 1967, a contract for the development of HART was given to the Martin Marietta corporation, based in Orlando, Florida; the rocket received the official designation of AGR-14 ZAP, for "Zero Anti-Aircraft Potential", at this time. Initial test firings of the XAGR-14A prototypes were conducted in late 1969, with the Douglas A-4 Skyhawk being used as a launch aircraft. Despite the rocket being tested successfully, the project was cancelled shortly thereafter, and ZAP failed to reach operational service.
