= Boeing SolarEagle =

SolarEagle

General information
- Type: High Altitude, Long Endurance Unmanned aerial vehicle
- National origin: United States
- Manufacturer: Boeing
- Status: Cancelled

The Boeing SolarEagle (Vulture II) was a proposed High-Altitude Long Endurance (HALE) unmanned aerial vehicle solar-electric spy plane developed by Boeing Phantom Works.

The proposed aircraft had a wingspan of 393.7 feet (120.0 meters), and was intended to remain airborne for up to five years at a time without needing to land. It had 20 motors of the same type as the Qinetiq Zephyr designed by Newcastle University. Boeing was awarded an $89 million contract by DARPA's Vulture program, with Boeing covering the remainder. It was slated to make its first flight in 2014, but in 2012 the SolarEagle project was cancelled and DARPA's Vulture program was refocused on advancing photovoltaic and energy storage technologies.
