= TXI =

Manufacturing company

TXI Operations LP
- Formerly: Texas Industries, Inc.
- Company type: Subsidiary
- Industry: Cement
- Founded: 1946; 80 years ago
- Headquarters: Dallas, Texas, United States
- Key people: Melvin G. Brekhus (President and CEO, Director)
- Products: Cement, aggregate, concrete
- Parent: Martin Marietta Materials
- Website: www.txi.com

TXI Operations LP, formerly Texas Industries, is a wholly owned subsidiary. The company was focused on the production of heavy construction materials in the southwestern United States market (e.g. Texas and California).

TXI mainly focuses on cement, Portland, masonry and oil well cements, aggregates, and other concrete related products. Until 2012, Texas Industries owned 82 manufacturing facilities in six states.

== History ==
TXI was founded in 1946. In 1994, with an annual revenue of $614M, the company ranked 500th on the Fortune 500 list by annual revenue. (Note: In 1994, the Fortune 500 list ranked industrial companies. It did not include service companies.)

In January 2014, Martin Marietta Materials (MLM), a rival provider of construction materials, agreed to buy TXI for $2.06 billion in stock. The combined company will operate under the name Martin Marietta with 7,000 employees and headquarters in Raleigh, N.C., Martin Marietta’s current home.

As of July 2, 2014, TXI became a wholly owned subsidiary of Martin Marietta Materials, Inc. TXI is now headquartered in Dallas, Texas.

== Key facilities ==
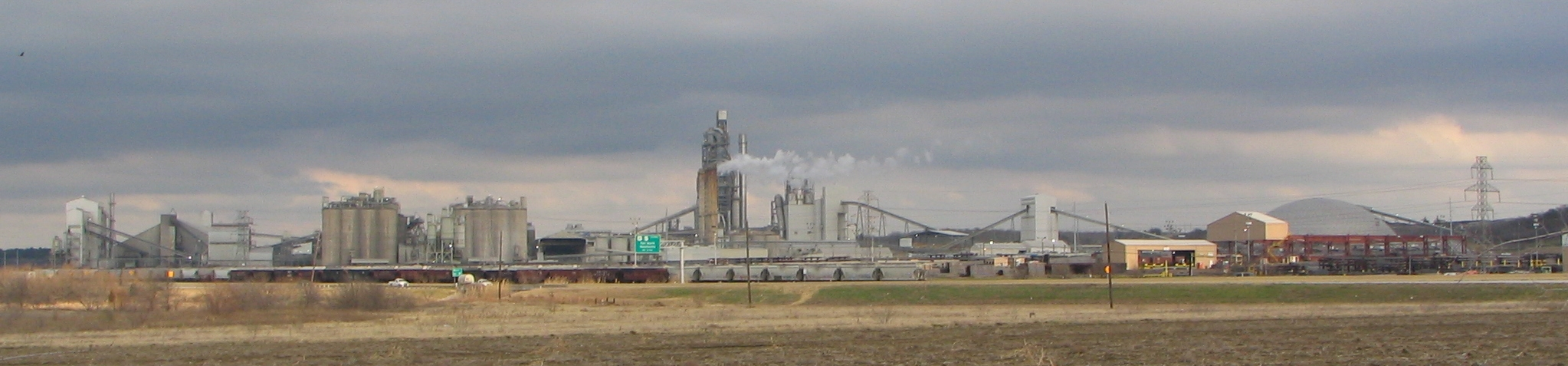
TXI cement plant in Midlothian, Texas on January 27, 2007

Its Midlothian plant on the south side of Midlothian, Texas (32°27′43″N 97°1′21″W) is about 27 miles (43 km) south of downtown Dallas. When the plant was built it was the largest cement plant in the country.

Former key facilities

The Chaparral Steel plant is next to TXI's cement plant in Midlothian. Chaparral Steel was spun off from TXI and later purchased by Gerdau in 2007 for $4.2 billion. At that time, Chaparral Steel was the second-largest producer of structural steel beams in North America and a major producer of steel bar product.
