= Martin Gang =

American lawyer (1901–1998)

- Born: March 12, 1901; Passaic, New Jersey, U.S.
- Died: January 29, 1998 (aged 96); Santa Monica, California, U.S.
- Education: Harvard University; Heidelberg University; UC Berkeley School of Law
- Occupation: Lawyer
- Known for: Representing film artists targeted by the HUAC

Martin Gang (March 12, 1901 – January 29, 1998) was a noted American lawyer considered a "pioneer in entertainment law". He was a founding partner in 1931 of the Hollywood law firm Gang, Kopp and Tyre (now known as Gang, Tyre, Ramer, Brown & Passman), and remained with the firm until his death.

During the McCarthy era, Gang became famous for helping numerous entertainment industry professionals clear themselves with the House Un-American Activities Committee (HUAC), and thereby avoid the Hollywood blacklist. His legal strategy of fully cooperating with the Committee, and advising his clients to "name names", made Gang a polarizing figure. He was thanked by those whose livelihoods he saved, and scorned by critics of the Committee and by blacklist victims.

== Early life and education ==
Gang's parents, Adolph Gang and Fannie Kopper, were Eastern European Jews who immigrated to the United States in the 1890s. Martin was born in Passaic, New Jersey in 1901. After graduating from Harvard, he spent part of the 1920s studying economics in Weimar Germany, and received a PhD from Heidelberg University. He returned to the U.S. to earn his law degree from Boalt Law School in Berkeley, California.

== Career ==
Gang began practicing law with the Los Angeles firm of Loeb & Loeb, which represented the movie studios and was one of the few major L.A. law firms in the late 1920s that hired Jewish lawyers. However, Gang soon grew dissatisfied at Loeb & Loeb and wanted to set up his own Hollywood firm, which he did in 1931 when partnering with lawyers Robert Kopp and Norman Tyre to form Gang, Kopp and Tyre. Leveraging his film industry connections from Loeb & Loeb, Gang and his partners developed a thriving business, eventually representing such Hollywood luminaries as Gene Autry, Bob Hope, George Burns, Olivia de Havilland, Myrna Loy, Paulette Goddard, Lucille Ball, Rita Hayworth, Elizabeth Taylor, Marilyn Monroe, and Frank Sinatra.

Throughout his life, Gang was very active in the American Jewish Committee (AJC). He was a founder, chairman and president of AJC's Los Angeles chapter. He was later an honorary National Vice President, member of the Board of Governors and National Leadership Council, and recipient of AJC's Judge Learned Hand Award and Distinguished Service Award.

Gang started to become nationally known during the late 1940s when the United States Congress and The Hollywood Reporter magazine were alleging links between the Communist Party (CPUSA) and Hollywood. In 1946, he filed a lawsuit on behalf of actress Myrna Loy against The Reporter for calling her "part of the Communist fifth column". Eventually, The Reporter had to issue a front-page retraction. In October 1950, he represented a faction of the Screen Directors Guild—including William Wyler, Billy Wilder, Joseph Losey, John Huston, and Fred Zinneman—who joined with the Guild's president Joseph L. Mankiewicz in resisting efforts by another faction (led by Cecil B. DeMille, Frank Capra and Leo McCarey) to impose a loyalty oath on all Guild members.

=== House Un-American Activities Committee ===
In early 1951, Gang began to defend show business professionals targeted by the HUAC as Communists, Communist sympathizers, or "fellow travelers". Non-cooperation with the Committee meant blacklisting and potential imprisonment for contempt of Congress. Victor Navasky writes:

According to Gang, a lawyer's obligation is simple—to serve his client's best interests. And in the case of his Hollywood clients, their best interests were served by not being blacklisted. So Gang devoted himself to working out a variety of formats to clear them. "I didn't tell them what to do; I only told them what the choices were."

In Gang's first attempt to clear a client with the HUAC, he defended actor Sterling Hayden who had briefly been a CPUSA member in 1946. Hayden testified before the Committee in Washington, D.C. on April 10, 1951. Following Gang's advice, Hayden denounced his decision to join the CPUSA as "the stupidest and most ignorant thing I have ever done in my life." He proceeded to name several former associates as Communists. In response to a query from Congressman Clyde Doyle, the actor praised the HUAC's mission and said his appearance that day "could serve a very useful purpose." Hayden was thanked by the Committee and permitted to return to work.

Gang repeated this same HUAC defense strategy with Lee J. Cobb, Roland Kibbee, Abe Burrows, Lloyd Bridges, Silvia Richards, Richard Collins, and David Raksin, among others. Raksin recalled being counselled by Gang: "'If you don't talk, those bastards will put you in jail.' Gang told me, 'Don't hide anything; they know all about you.'" In the case of outspoken liberals such as Burt Lancaster and John Houseman, Gang met privately with the HUAC to clear the actors without their needing to testify. His goal was always to find out which combination of statements and actions would satisfy the Committee. He often flew to Washington, D.C. to negotiate with the HUAC's congressmen and investigative team, which involved socializing with them as well. He later said this about HUAC investigator William A. Wheeler:

"I got to be very fond of Bill Wheeler. I think I kind of educated him, because I used to take him to dinner with people who were on his list.... A lot of people who he was personally convinced were okay, he never pursued them.... There used to be a Japanese place—I remember taking him to dinner with two clients of mine whom he wanted to talk to. And he became convinced they were in the clear, and he never bothered to subpoena them. So there again I think I did my clients a favor and I also did Wheeler a favor. I don't know what it proved about me, but Wheeler was doing a job, and what I tried to do was to present the facts to him in such a way that my clients would not be unnecessarily hurt. And if that's a crime you can convict me."

As a result of his determined efforts and his willingness to recommend "naming names" as a justifiable option, Gang was credited with being the most frequent "clearance" lawyer in the entertainment industry: "Gang wound up representing more informers than any other Hollywood lawyer – by his own estimate, some twenty movie people and thirty more in other professions. His justification was simple: he was helping worthy but misguided people stay out of prison and keep their jobs." Gang's method of clearing entertainers became so routine that testifying to the HUAC with Martin Gang at your side was known as "walking the Gang-plank."

According to journalist Glenn Frankel,

[Gang] sometimes lost patience with clients who refused to see the light. When screenwriter Carl Foreman resisted naming names, Gang warned that the government was preparing to reopen the concentration camp at Tulelake, California, that had been built to detain Japanese Americans during World War II. Only this time, Gang warned, the detainees would be Leftists like Foreman. "'He had set out to frighten me, and he did," Foreman recalled. (Still, Foreman refused to cooperate and hired a different lawyer.)

Frankel added that the moral dilemma which Jews like Gang and Foreman wrestled with when faced with the HUAC was emblematic of the diverse ways individual Jews had responded throughout history to societal repression: "One response was Martin Gang's: give the despot what he demands. Another was Carl Foreman's, resisting for the sake of principle even at the cost of one's own livelihood."

=== Later years ===
Gang was not without detractors. By accepting the legitimacy of the HUAC and counselling his clients to inform on colleagues, he was shunned by film industry professionals—such as the "Hollywood Ten" and their supporters—who had challenged the Committee's right to investigate the beliefs and associations of American citizens. When Charles Katz, a member of the Hollywood Ten defense team, learned he would be on the same dais as Gang at a 1970s California ACLU fundraising dinner, Katz reportedly exclaimed, "Appear with Gang? That's like asking me to appear with Torquemada's adjutant."

In a 2013 interview, Gang's nephew Robert Kopp said: "I'm sure that with time [my uncle] Martin knew that what he was doing was quite controversial, but that didn't bother him. There's an anecdote told in several places that at one point he went to some party in Hollywood, and there were 20 or 30 people in the room, actors and writers, and he went into the room and looked about him, and he said to his host, 'I got every one of those sons of bitches off.'"

Martin Gang died on January 29, 1998 in Santa Monica, California. He was 96.

== Portrayals in media ==
In Guilty by Suspicion (1991), former blacklisted actor Sam Wanamaker portrays Felix Graff, a lawyer character based on Martin Gang. In a scene at an HUAC hearing, Graff advises his hesitating client David Merrill, who is having qualms about informing: "They want the names, David, that's why we're here. C'mon, you can't beat these bastards. You keep this up and they'll tear your head off."

During the rise of Nazi Germany, Gang rescued several of his Jewish family members in Vienna, Austria from arrest and certain death. His exploits were later chronicled in the 2010 documentary film Auf Wiedersehen: 'Til We Meet Again.

== See also ==
- Hollywood blacklist
- Sterling Hayden
- Olivia de Havilland
