= Boeing Model 493 =

1950s aircraft design

Model 493

General information
- Type: Cargo transport
- National origin: United States
- Manufacturer: Boeing
- Status: Cancelled
- Number built: None

History
- First flight: Never built

The Boeing Model 493 was a proposed, large, turboprop-driven transport aircraft envisaged in the early 1950s by the United States aircraft manufacturer Boeing for use by the USAF.

== Design and development ==
The Model 493-3-2 was similar to the baseline C-97 Stratofreighter but differed in having a gull-wing and increased wingspan, but also turboprop engines. The wingspan measured 165 feet from tip to tip, and the fuselage diameter was increased to 214 inches to accommodate a second deck as on the Douglas C-124 Globemaster II.

Although a promising design, the Model 493 never left the drawboard because of the USAF's announcement of the XC-Heavy competition based on the concept of pod-equipped airlifter.

The Model 493-3-2 is known in some sources as the C-127, but Air Force records show that the C-127 designator was allocated to the Douglas C-124B.

== See also ==
- List of military aircraft of the United States
