= GQM-163 Coyote =

U.S. Navy sea-skimming missile test target

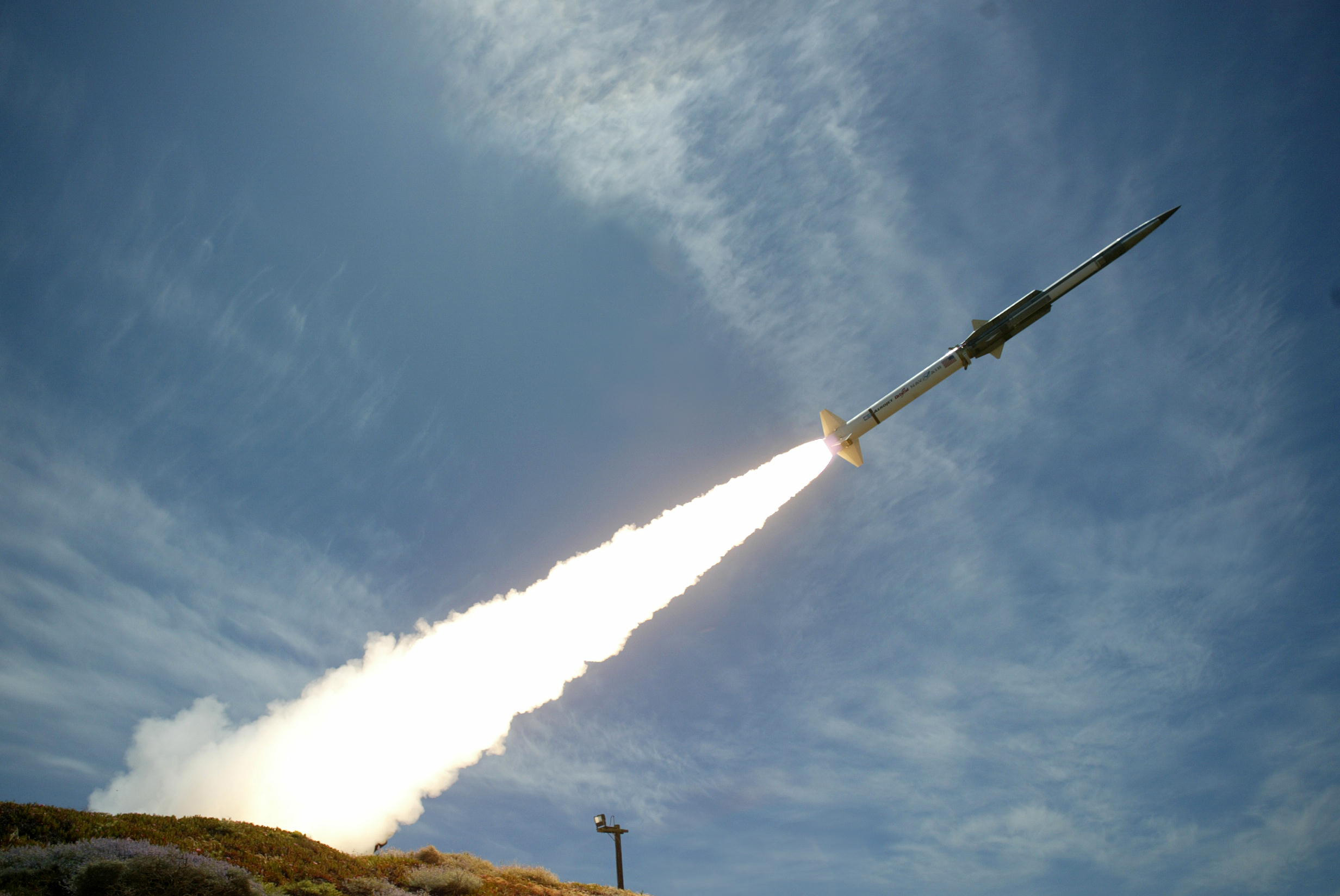
- A GQM-163A Coyote test launch in May 2004.

Production history
- Manufacturer: Northrop Grumman (formerly Orbital Sciences)

Specifications
- Length: 18.4 ft (5.62 m) without booster, 31.4 ft (9.56 m) with booster
- Diameter: 14 in (35 cm), booster: 18 in (46 cm)
- Propellant: Aerojet MARC-R-282 solid-fueled ducted rocket/ramjet engine
- Operational range: 45 nmi (52 mi; 83 km)
- Flight ceiling: 55,000 ft (17,000 m)
- Flight altitude: Sea-skimming: 30 ft (9.1 m) cruise phase, 15 ft (4.6 m) terminal phase
- Boost time: Hercules MK 70 solid-fueled rocket
- Maximum speed: Mach 3.0-4.0 at 5,000–55,000 ft (1,500–16,800 m), Mach 2.6 at 15–30 ft (5–9 m)

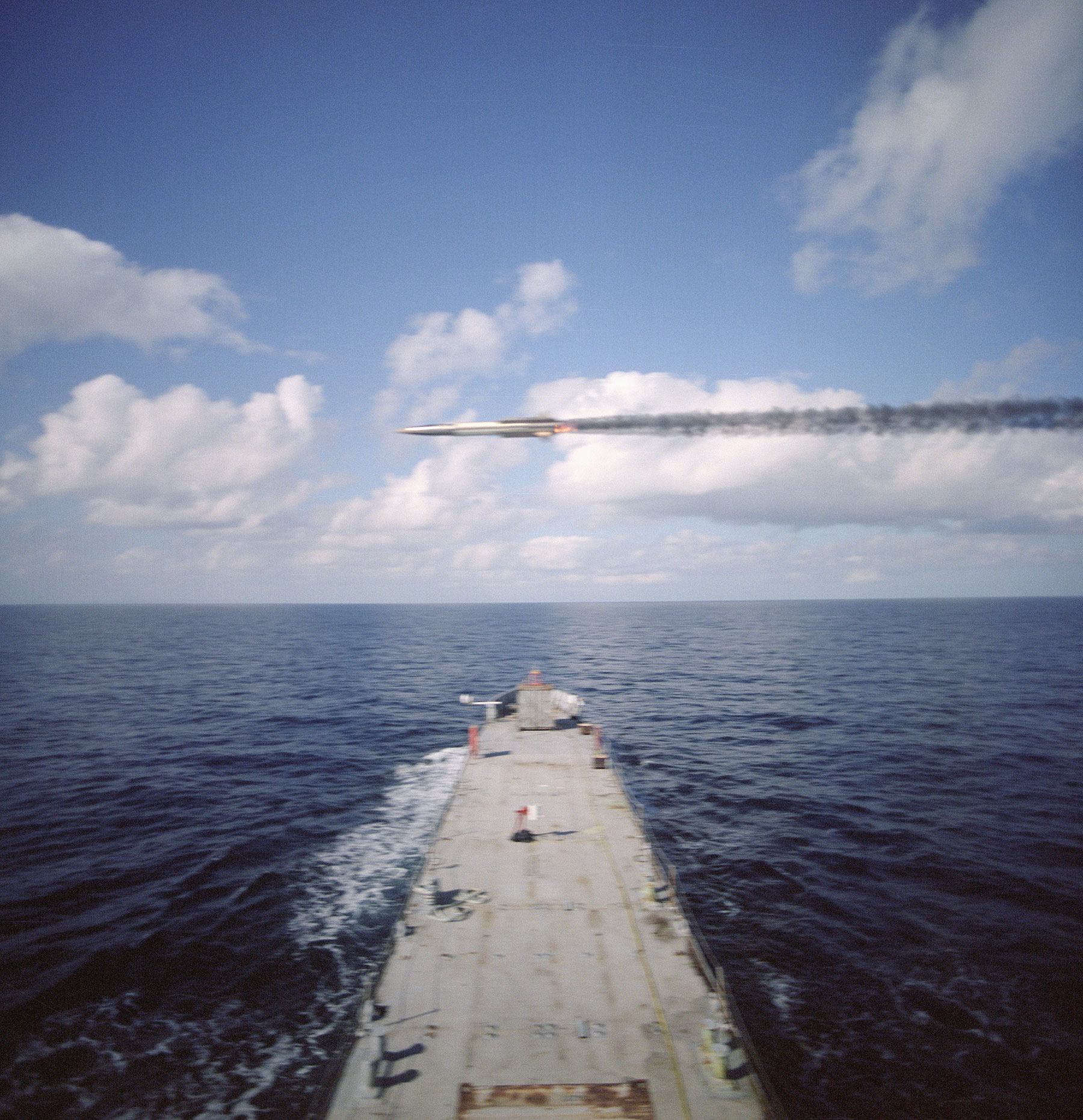
A GQM-163A Coyote flies over the bow of a U.S. Navy observation ship during a routine test.

The GQM-163 Coyote is a supersonic sea-skimming missile target built by Northrop Grumman (formerly Orbital ATK) and used by the United States Navy as a successor to the MQM-8 Vandal. Orbital's proposal was chosen over the MA-31, a joint venture between Boeing and Zvezda-Strela. Orbital was awarded the development contract for the Coyote SSST in June 2000.

The Coyote is launched by a Hercules MK-70 booster, of similar design to those used by the obsolete RIM-67 Standard ER missiles. After the booster stage is expended the missile switches to an Aerojet MARC-R-282 solid-fuel rocket/ramjet engine for sustained flight.

In July 2018, Orbital Sciences Corp was awarded a US$52m modification to its existing contract, for 18 Lot 12 targets plus some Foreign Military Sales.

== Operators ==
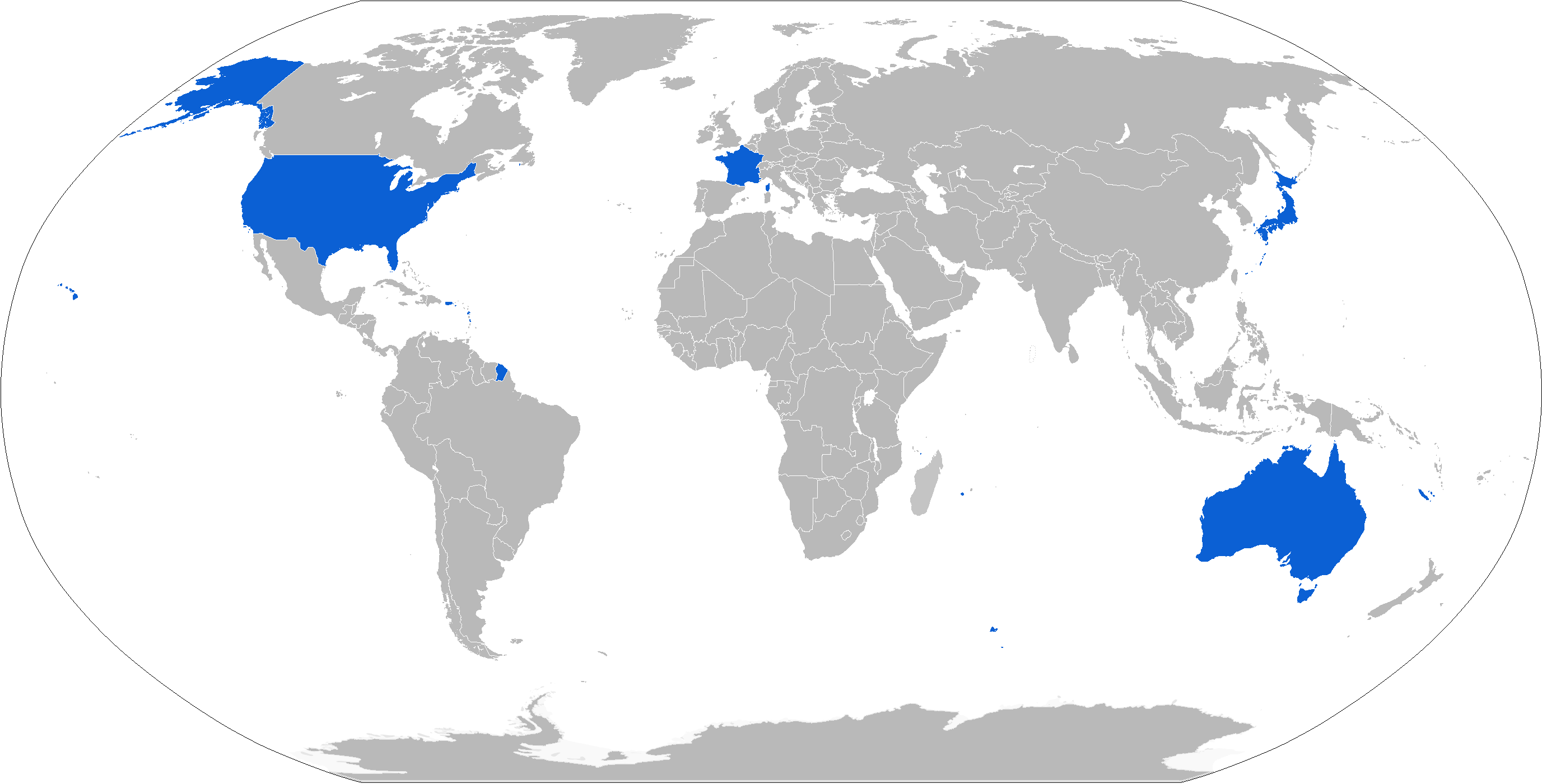
Map with CQM-163 operators in blue

United States of America

- US Navy

France

- French Navy

Australia

- Royal Australian Navy

Japan

- Japan Maritime Self Defense Force
