= Spectrolab =

American solar cell manufacturer

- Type: Subsidiary
- Industry: Aerospace
- Founded: 1956; 70 years ago
- Founder: Alfred E. Mann
- Headquarters: Sylmar, California, United States
- Products: Solar cells; Airborne searchlights; Solar simulators
- Number of employees: 150 (2025)
- Parent: The Boeing Company
- Website: www.spectrolab.com

Spectrolab Inc. is a manufacturer of solar cells headquartered in Sylmar, California. It produces solar cells for both terrestrial and space use, as well as airborne searchlights and solar simulators. Spectrolab is a subsidiary of The Boeing Company and is part of Boeing Defense, Space & Security.

Spectrolab has contributed to solar development with multiple solar cell world records, and its cells have been used in spacecraft for decades, notably in Apollo 11, the Mars Exploration Rover mission, and the International Space Station.

== History ==
=== Background and early history (1956–1975) ===
While earning his Master of Science in physics at the University of California, Los Angeles, Alfred E. Mann was hired at Technicolor Corporation to work on electro-optics. It was there that Mann realized the work he was doing on light filtering could be used for missile guidance systems and was in demand by the United States Army. When he approached his superiors at Technicolor about this, Mann was denied. In 1956, Mann was offered a contract by the Army and subsequently founded Spectrolab, his first company, in Sylmar, California. At this point, Spectrolab was a government contractor that sold high-quality mirrors and optical filters.

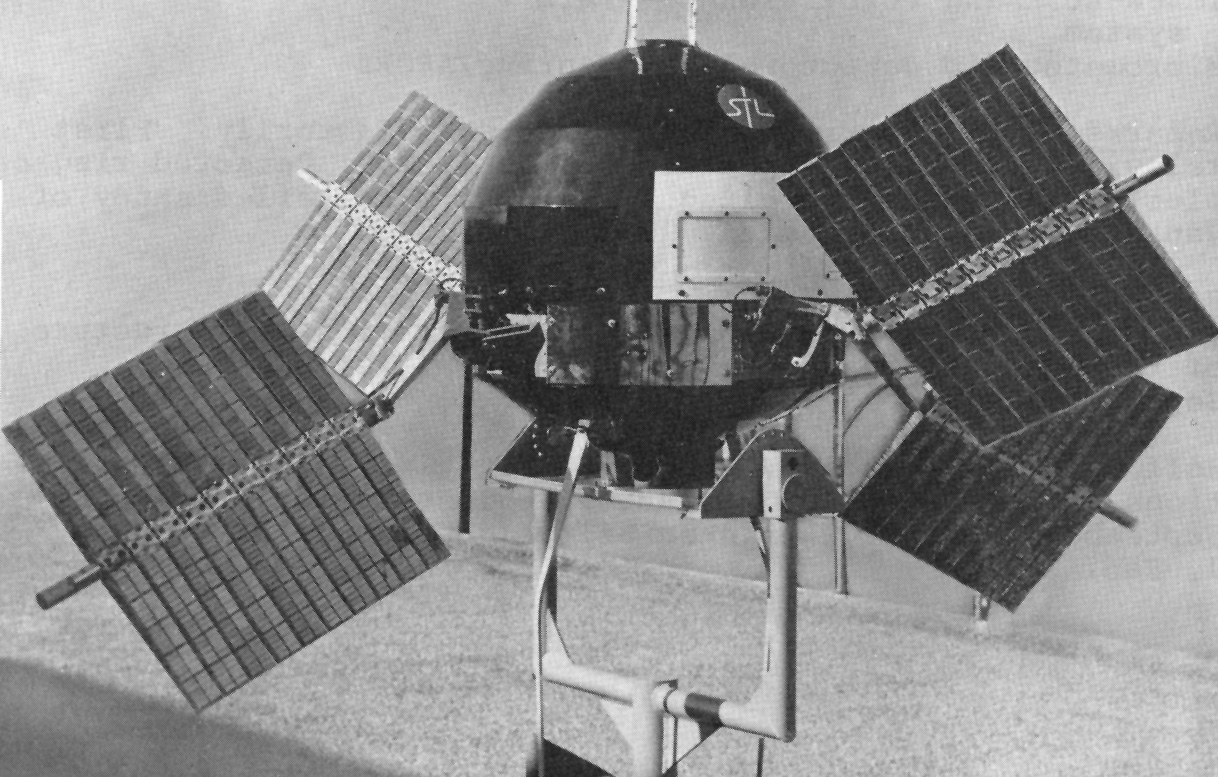
The Explorer 6 satellite

Two years later, a request from the Air Force prompted Spectrolab to design solar cells for space use. This would lead to the company working on the spacecraft Pioneer 1, which contained Spectrolab's first body-mounted solar panels. The following year, Spectrolab contributed to Explorer 6, which carried the company's first solar arrays and took the first picture of Earth from space.

Spectrolab was sold to Textron Inc. in 1960 alongside Heliotek, another of Mann's companies. At Textron, it was known as the Heliotek Divison. Despite the purchase, Spectrolab remained autonomous and there were no changes to the leadership.

The 1960s also saw Spectrolab expanding its business beyond solar cells. In 1962, it began manufacturing its own solar simulators, and in 1969 sold its first Nightsun airborne searchlights to Bell Helicopter.

Bill Yerkes, who previously worked on the Lunar Orbiter at Boeing, became president of Spectrolab in 1967. Under his leadership, Spectrolab made the solar array that powered the Passive Seismic Experiment Package that was left on the moon during the 1969 Apollo 11 mission. This was the first solar panel on the moon.

That same year, researchers at the Johns Hopkins University Applied Physics Laboratory (APL) wanted to use the technology developed by Spectrolab to make longer-lasting pacemakers. This led to Mann creating Pacesetter Systems alongside the APL's Robert Fischell, and in 1972 Mann left Spectrolab.

Amid the 1973 oil crisis, Spectrolab hired Ishaq Shahryar, who developed the method of screen-printing solar cells onto wafers, to develop solar cells for use on Earth. The result of this was a reduction in cell cost from $500 per watt to only $30. In 1975, Spectrolab produced its first terrestrial solar panels with a cost of $25 per watt.

=== Hughes subsidiary (1975–2000) ===
Spectrolab was acquired by and became a subsidiary of Hughes Aircraft Company in 1975. Afterwards, Hughes decided to shift Spectrolab's priority back to space. Yerkes was dismissed and Shahryar left, with both of them going on to start their own terrestrial solar companies. This also marks when Spectrolab began to increase its efforts to improve solar cell efficiency amid a demand for more capable satellites.

Spectrolab began investing in gallium arsenide (GaAs) solar cells as a substitute to silicon in 1981, with a goal of increasing cost-effectiveness, performance, and reliability. This research became even more important in 1985 when sales decreased due to lower interest in satellite home-entertainment. The company also continued its earlier practice of diversifying, with solar simulators and searchlights representing 20% of its sales.

In 1997, Spectrolab successfully used dual-junction solar cells after more than ten years in development. The cells were printed on a germanium (Ge) wafer and had an efficiency of 21.6%. Their first use was on the PAS-5 communications satellite, which represented the first time a commercial spacecraft used dual-junction solar cells as a primary power source. The dual-junction solar cell is actually two solar cells layered on top of each other, with each cell handling a separate portion of the light spectrum. In this case, the top layer of gallium indium phosphide (GaInP) only converts short wavelengths and the rest pass through to the gallium arsenide layer.

At the same time dual-junction cells were still being developed, triple-junction cells were also being researched, with development first starting in 1990. In October 1999, Spectrolab, in conjunction with the National Renewable Energy Laboratory (NREL), announced a 32.3% conversion efficiency, a world record at the time, made possible by a triple-junction concentrator solar cell. The triple-junction cells functioned similarly to the dual-junction, but with the addition of a germanium cell which has the lowest bandgap.

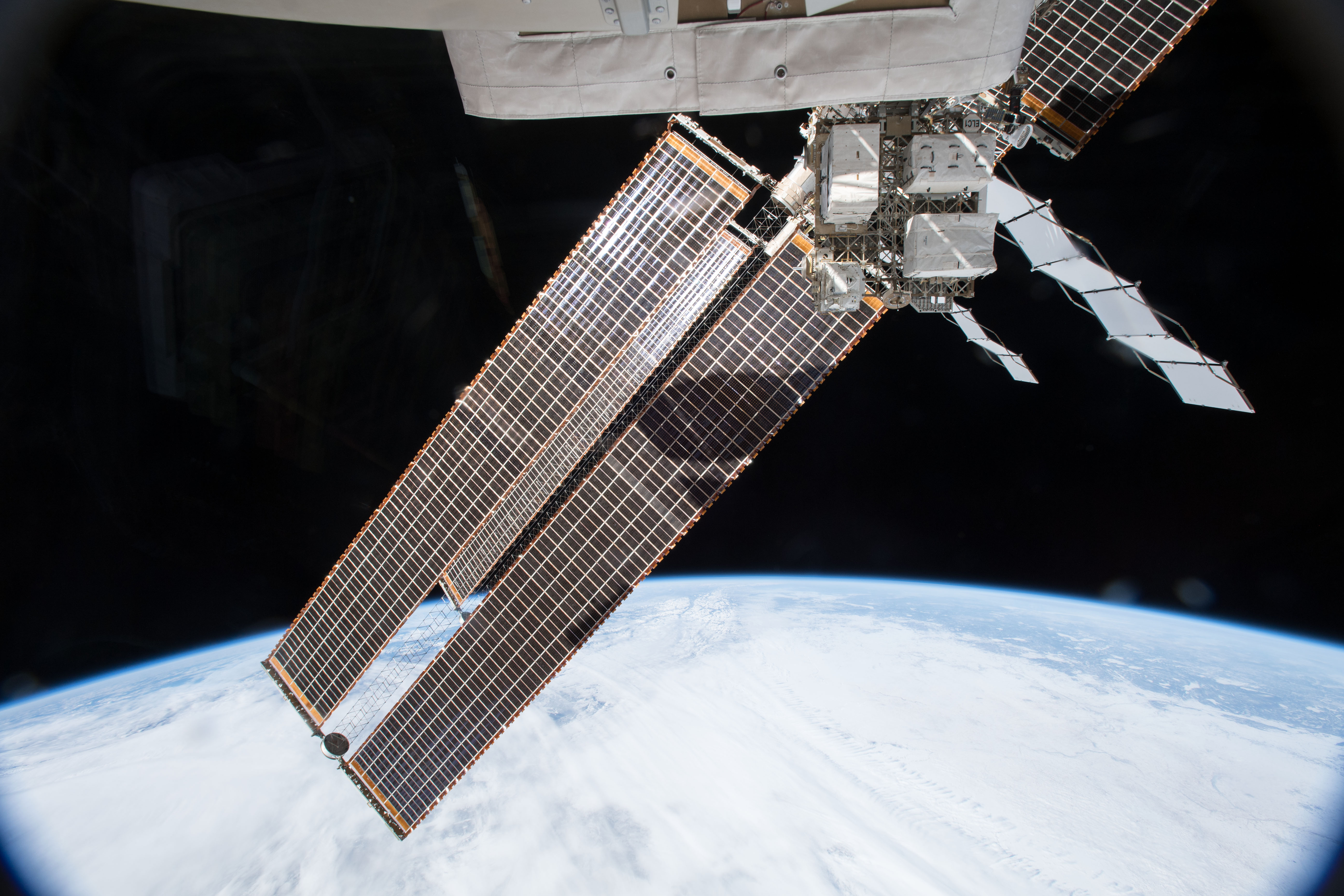
One of the main solar arrays and a radiator of the ISS

Although Spectrolab was fighting for the contract for a planned NASA Space Station as early as 1985, it wasn't until 1998 that construction would begin on the International Space Station (ISS). The station included 262,400 silicon cells manufactured by Spectrolab, with approximately 15% efficiency and a maximum power generation of roughly 250 kW at beginning of life. The solar cells were compiled into eight 107 by 38 feet (33 by 12 m) solar array wings by Lockheed Martin. The ISS' solar array was completed in 2009, when the Space Shuttle Discovery delivered the last two wings.

=== Boeing (2000–present) ===
In 2000, a $3.75 billion deal saw Boeing acquire the space and communications unit of Hughes Electronics Corporation along with the Hughes Electron Dynamics Division and Spectrolab. The three units were consolidated into Boeing Satellite Systems, which in 2001 became part of Boeing Integrated Defense Systems before the name was changed to Boeing Defense, Space & Security in 2011.

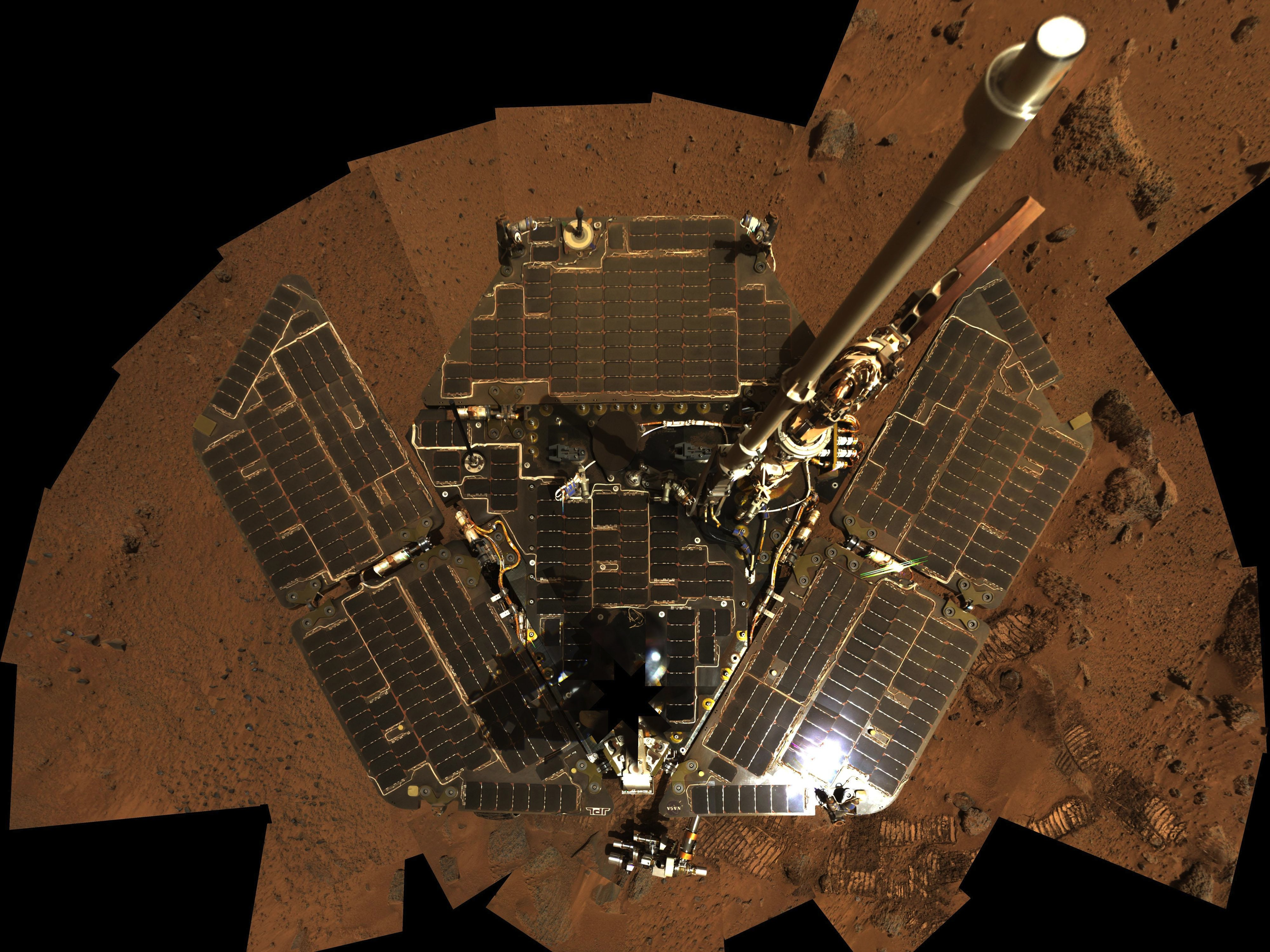
Self-portrait photo of Spirit showing its unfolded solar panels.

Launched in mid-2003, the Mars Exploration Rovers, Spirit and Opportunity, each featured 1.6 sq yd (1.3 m^{2}) of Spectrolab's Improved Triple Junction solar cells. The cells had an efficiency of 36.9% under concentration and were modified for terrestrial use due to the conditions on Mars. Spectrolab also provided the cells for the Mars Phoenix Lander.

The following years would see Spectrolab pushing to expand its terrestrial market. In 2006, Spectrolab secured multiple such contracts, including with Solar Systems of Australia and SolFocus of San Jose. Altogether, the cells from the contracts would be enough to power approximately 780,000 homes. This also coincided with an increase in Spectrolab's solar cell efficiency. That year, testing at the NREL demonstrated a record-breaking efficiency of 40.7% under concentration with an AlGaInP/GaAs/Ge metamorphic triple-junction cell. In 2009, the company set another world record with an efficiency of 41.6%.

Technicians performing illumination tests on one of Juno's solar arrays.

Spectrolab cells continued to be used in space, as well. The Juno spacecraft, launched in 2011, broke the record for the farthest a solar-powered spacecraft had traveled from the sun in 2016. The spacecraft has 18,698 solar cells divided across three 30-foot (9.1 m) long solar arrays. At the same distance from the sun as the Earth, the cells could produce about 14 kW, but at Jupiter, the distances involved means they will only generate 500 watts.

Despite previous innovations, by 2012 the terrestrial market only represented 5 to 10% of Spectrolab's solar sales. The main reasons for this were the high number of competitors and the fact that the concentrator photovoltaic systems (CPVs) Spectrolab specializes in were more expensive than traditional solar cells. At the time, the cost for a CPV was $3 per watt, while traditional silicon systems were $2 per watt. Hoping to increase its market share, the company underwent a renovation of its facilities. Spectrolab would also continue to increase the capabilities of its cells. In 2013, testing at the NREL demonstrated an efficiency of 38.8% in ground-based cells without concentration, a new world record.

Using optical band-pass filtering and a separate silicon cell, 40.4% efficiency (with concentrators) was certified at the NREL with a solar collector featuring Spectrolab triple-junction solar cells in 2014. Although 40% efficiency had already been achieved for solar cells, the prototype represented the first time it had been demonstrated in a photovoltaic system. Beyond increased efficiency, this method also mitigates a downside of the traditional triple-junction cell with reduced heat generation from wasted current.

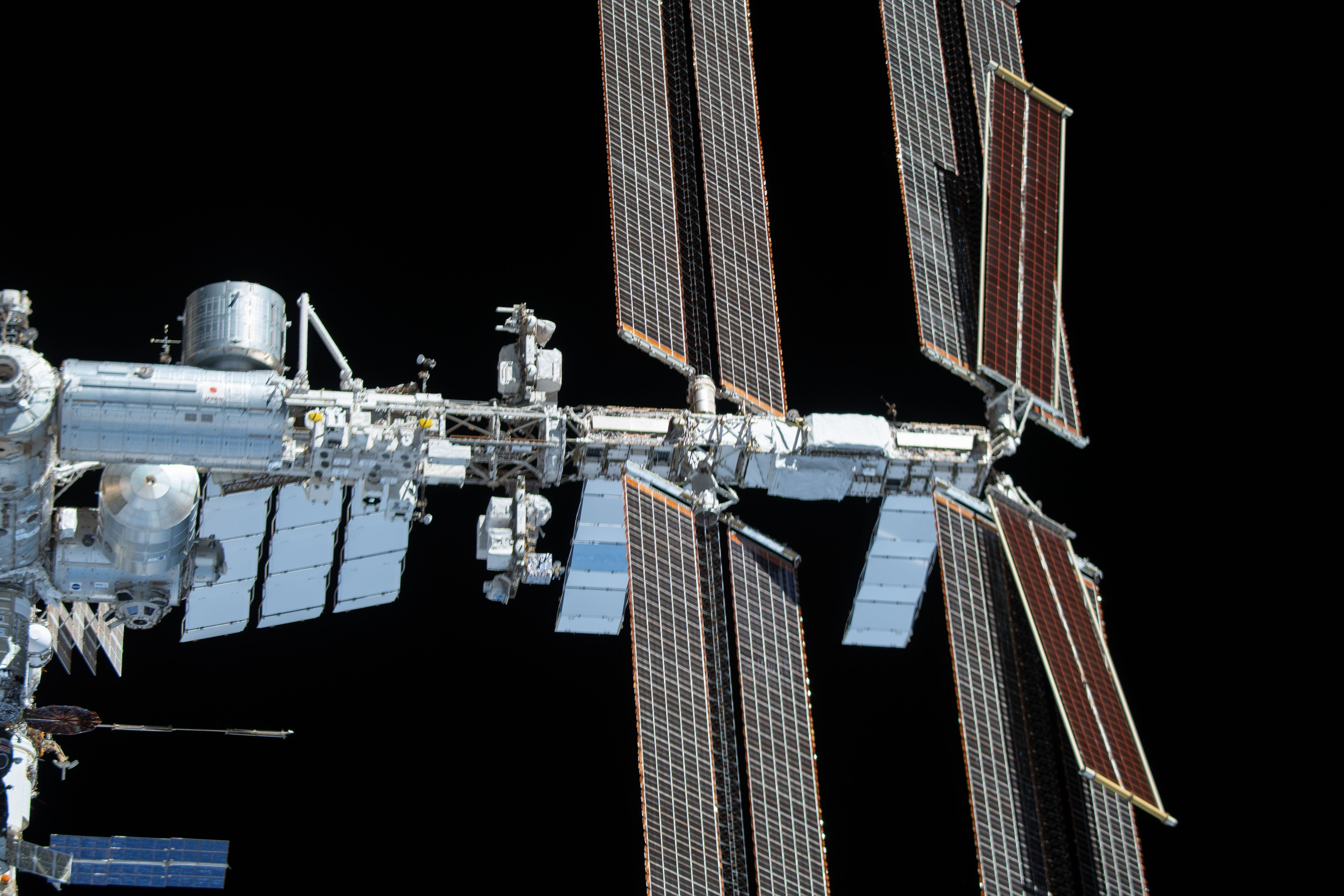
Two of the iROSA solar arrays on top of the ISS' original wings.

In space, solar cells are exposed to charged particle radiation. In particular, the ISS, being in low Earth orbit, is exposed to the Van Allen radiation belts. The result is that its silicon solar cells degrade over time. The solar arrays on the ISS were created with a 15-year service life, and by 2021 the oldest pair had been in use for over 20 years. Although the arrays were still functioning, their maximum generation had degraded to 160 kW.

Because of this, six ISS Roll Out Solar Arrays (iROSA) were designed to increase power while taking advantage of existing systems. The new arrays were created by Spectrolab, along with Deployable Space Systems and Boeing. They were delivered two at a time from 2021 to 2023. The iROSA use Spectrolab's NeXt Triple Junction Prime solar cells; they were also used for NASA's Roman Space Telescope.

== Other products ==
=== Searchlights ===
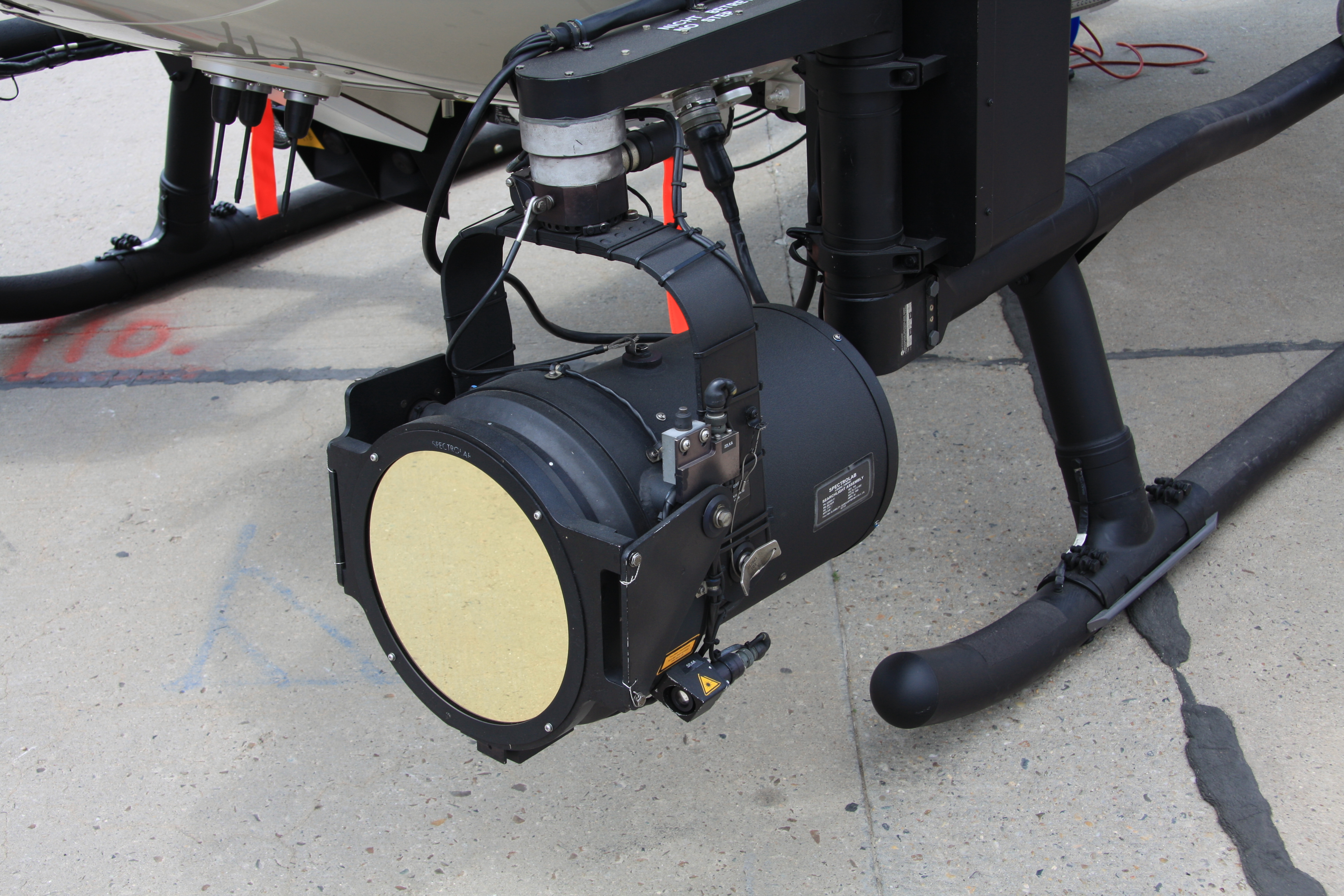
SX-16 Nightsun searchlight on a German Federal Police helicopter

Spectrolab is the manufacturer of the Nightsun line of airborne searchlights. One model, the SX-16 Nightsun, produces 30 million candlepower of illumination. They are employed by both law enforcement and military, with common uses being search and rescue, crowd control, and as a navigational aid.

=== Solar simulators ===
Spectrolab manufactures solar simulators, including those with steady-state and flashed illumination. They are used to test solar cells as well as other devices, such as flight hardware. Examples include the Class AAA Spectrolab X25 solar simulator, which has steady-state illumination, and the Spectrolab 460, which is a flash solar simulator.

== See also ==
- Hoffman Electronics Corporation – Another California-based company that worked on early space photovoltaics
- Timeline of solar cells
