= Xenon lamp =

Xenon lamp may refer to:

- Xenon arc lamp
- Xenon flash lamp
- An incandescent light bulb filled with xenon gas to improve life span or efficiency
- A metal halide lamp that is used in automotive headlights
