= Ishaq Shahryar =

Afghan ambassador and inventor

Ishaq M. Shahryar (January 10, 1936 – April 12, 2009) was the inventor of the low-cost photovoltaic cell and the first Afghan ambassador to the United States since the Soviet Invasion of Afghanistan in 1979. New Scientist named Shahryar "the Sun King," recognizing his virtual invention of solar power as a serious energy source and honoring his dedication to reinventing Afghan villages through solar power and increased business opportunities.

== Early life and education ==
Born in Kabul, Afghanistan, Shahryar received a government scholarship in 1956 to study at UC Berkeley and UC Santa Barbara, where he earned his Bachelor's in Physical Chemistry and his Master's in International Relations.

== Technical career ==
On graduation, Shahryar worked as an engineer and became an integral part of NASA's Jupiter Project. In the early 1970s, Shahryar took a job at Spectrolab, a division of Textron. There, with support from Bill Yerkes, he invented the first terrestrial solar cell in 1972 and developed the process of screen-printing cells on solar panels, which is still used in the market today. The company was purchased by Hughes Aircraft in 1975, and the terrestrial division was closed. Shahryar founded his own company, Solec International, followed by Solar Utility Company and Sun King Solar in Los Angeles.

Shahryar's patents continued to lower the cost of solar energy in order to utilize the energy source more broadly. In 1987, Solec provided the solar cells for an electric racecar being built by the hair care entrepreneur and billionaire John Paul DeJoria, who later became his business partner. The Ferris wheel at the Santa Monica Pier operates on a photovoltaic system designed by Solar Utility Inc. The same system provides power for the parking structure at the Santa Monica Civic Auditorium. Solar-powered emergency call boxes dotting local freeways were designed by Shahryar. So were solar-powered lighting systems used in some bus shelters and billboards. His latest endeavor, Global Energy, aimed to reduce the cost of electricity to 6 or 7 cents a kilowatt in order to develop largely solar-powered model villages in underdeveloped nations.

== Political career ==
While working in solar energy, in 1994, Shahryar was named to the U.S. Presidential Mission on Sustainable Energy and Trade to India and has acted as an adviser to numerous trade and environmental groups in the United States and abroad.

Alongside his achievements in the solar industry, Shahryar remained involved in mitigating the plight of Afghan immigrants and in the politics of Afghanistan. Shahryar brought over 60 members of his family to the United States after the Soviet invasion of Afghanistan in 1979 and was a patron to the entire Afghan community throughout his life. Shahryar also served as an advisor to the exiled Afghan King Zahir Shah, and was a delegate at the Bonn Conference of 2001 that established Afghanistan's post-invasion roadmap.

In 2002, Shahryar was appointed as the Afghan ambassador to the United States. He renounced U.S. citizenship and closed his companies in order to take up the position. It is widely accepted that he served as ambassador for free and used much of his personal fortune to not only work on the embassy, but also on many social and developmental projects inside Afghanistan. Shahryar hosted President Bush's first visit to an embassy in September 2002. Shahryar created important light and warmth in the renewed U.S.-Afghan relationship and acted as a figure of liberalism, modernization, and women's rights in Afghanistan. He was named Ambassador of the Year by the World Affairs Council in 2002. In 2003, Shahryar resigned due to corruption and major roadblocks in the Afghan government, saying that " Karzai "has no vision–absolutely no vision, no quality for leadership."

== Death ==
Shahryar died on April 12, 2009, in Pacific Palisades, California. He left behind a wife, Hafizah, a son named Alexander Shahryar and a daughter named Jahan Shahryar. His memorial was held at the Hall of Liberty in Hollywood Hills.

== See also ==
- Afghanistan–United States relations
