= Xenon arc lamp =

Gas discharge lamp that produces intense white light

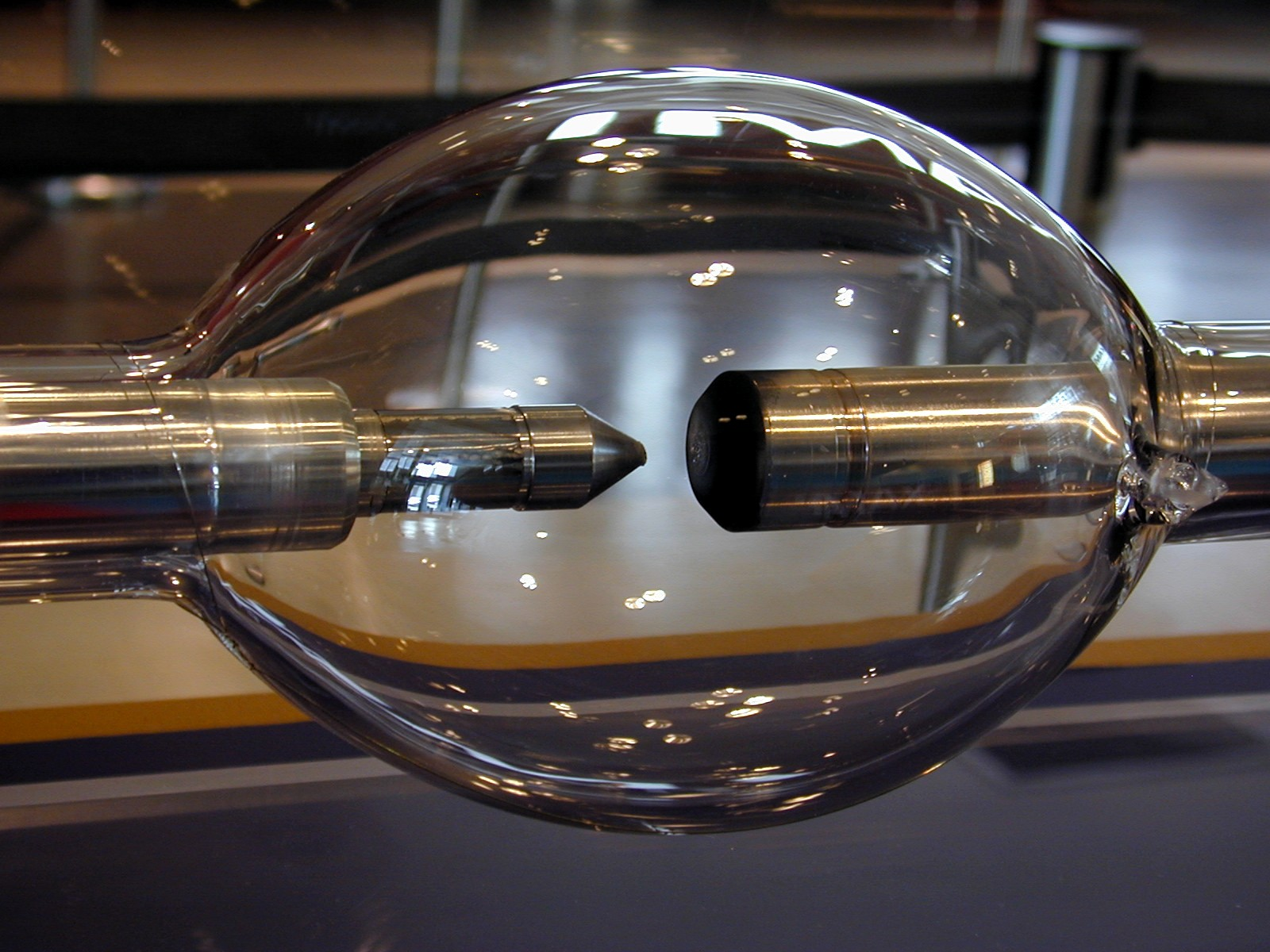
15 kW xenon short-arc lamp used in IMAX projectors

High-speed, slow-motion video of a xenon flashtube recorded at a speed of 44,025 frames per second.

A xenon arc lamp is a highly specialized type of gas discharge lamp, an electric light that produces light by passing electricity through ionized xenon gas at high pressure. It produces a bright white light to simulate sunlight, with applications in movie projectors in theaters, in searchlights, and for specialized uses in industry and research. For example, Xenon arc lamps and mercury lamps are the two most common lamps used in wide-field fluorescence microscopes.

== Types ==
Xenon arc lamps can be roughly divided into three categories:

- continuous-output xenon short-arc lamps,
- continuous-output xenon long-arc lamps, and
- xenon flash lamps (which are usually considered separately).

Each consists of a fused quartz or other heat resistant glass arc tube, with a tungsten metal electrode at each end. The glass tube is first evacuated and then re-filled with xenon gas. For xenon flashtubes, a third "trigger" electrode usually surrounds the exterior of the arc tube. The lifetime of a xenon arc lamp varies according to its design and power consumption, with a major manufacturer quoting average lifetimes ranging from 500 hours (7 kW) to 1,500 (1 kW).

== History ==
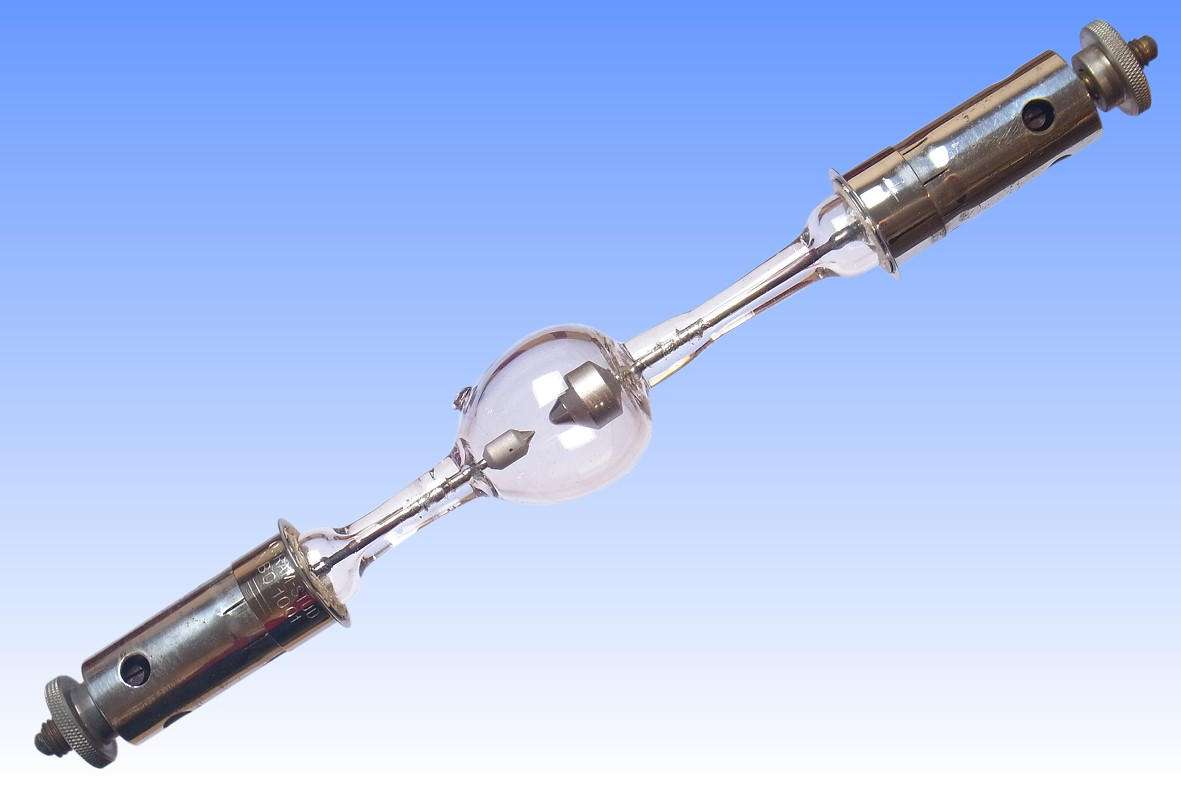
An early short arc xenon lamp from around 1954, the Osram-STUD XBO 1001

Interest in the xenon discharge was first aroused by P. Schulz in 1944, following his discovery of its near-continuous spectrum and high colour rendering white light. Owing to wartime limitations on the availability of this noble gas, significant progress was not made until John Aldington of the British Siemens lamp company published his research in 1949.

This triggered intensive efforts at the German Osram company to further develop the technology as a replacement for carbon arcs in cinema projection. The xenon lamp promised tremendous advantages of a more stable arc with less flicker, and its non-consumable electrodes allowed longer films to be shown without interruptions. Osram's primary contribution to this achievement was its thorough research of xenon discharge physics, which directed its developments towards very short arcs for DC operation with a particular electrode and bulb geometry. The cathode is kept small to reach high temperatures for thermionic emission, the anode being larger to dissipate the heat generated as incoming electrons are decelerated. Most light is generated immediately in front of the cathode tip, where arc temperatures reach 10,000 °C. The plasma is accelerated towards the anode and stabilised by the electrode shapes plus intrinsic magnetic compression generated by the current flow, and convection effects controlled by the bulb shape.

Following these developments, the first successful public projection using xenon light was performed on 30 October 1950, when excerpts from a colour film (Schwarzwaldmädel) were shown during the 216th session of the German Cinematographic Society in Berlin. The technology was commercially introduced by German Osram in 1952. First produced in the 2 kW size (XBO2001), and the 1 kW (XBO1001) these lamps saw wide use in movie projection, where they replaced the older, more labor-intensive (to operate) carbon arc lamps.

== Modern usage ==
The white continuous light generated by the xenon arc is spectrally similar to daylight, but the lamp has a rather low efficacy in terms of lumens of visible light output per watt of input power. Today, almost all movie projectors in theaters employ these lamps, with power ratings ranging from 900 watts up to 12 kW. Omnimax (Imax Dome) projection systems use single xenon lamps with ratings as high as 15 kW. As of 2016, laser illumination for digital theater projectors is starting to establish a market presence and has been predicted to supersede the xenon arc lamp for this application.

The very small size of the arc makes it possible to focus the light from the lamp with moderate precision. For this reason, xenon arc lamps of smaller sizes, down to 10 watts, are used in optics and in precision illumination for microscopes and other instruments, although in modern times they are being displaced by single mode laser diodes and white light supercontinuum lasers which can produce a truly diffraction-limited spot. Larger lamps are employed in searchlights where narrow beams of light are generated, or in film production lighting where daylight simulation is required.

All xenon short-arc lamps generate substantial ultraviolet radiation. Xenon has strong spectral lines in the UV bands, and these readily pass through the fused quartz lamp envelope unlike the borosilicate glass used in standard lamps; fused quartz readily passes UV radiation unless it is specially doped. The UV radiation released by a short-arc lamp can cause a secondary problem of ozone generation. The UV radiation strikes oxygen molecules in the air surrounding the lamp, causing them to ionize. Some of the ionized molecules then recombine as O_{3}, ozone. Equipment that uses short-arc lamps as the light source must contain UV radiation shielding and prevent ozone build-up.

Many lamps have a shortwave UV blocking coating on the envelope and are sold as "ozone free" lamps. These "ozone free" lamps are used commonly in indoor applications, where proper ventilation is not easily accessible. Some lamps have envelopes made out of ultra-pure synthetic fused silica, which roughly doubles the cost, but which allows them to emit useful light into the vacuum UV region. These lamps are normally operated in a pure nitrogen atmosphere.

== Lamp construction ==
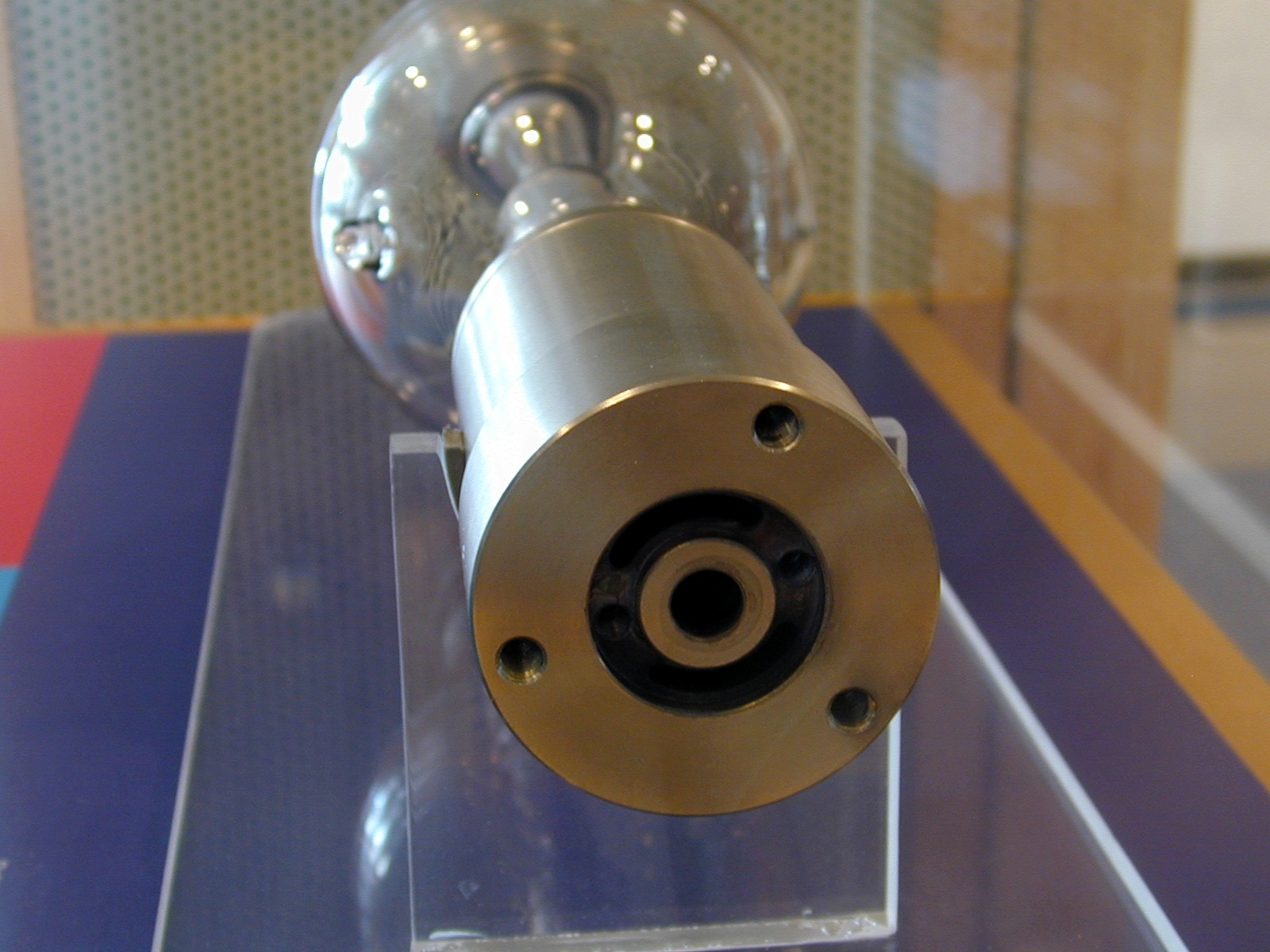
An end-view of a 15 kW IMAX lamp showing the liquid-cooling ports

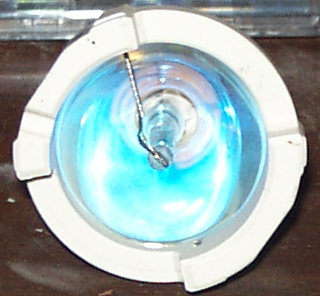
An Osram 100 W xenon/mercury short-arc lamp in reflector

All modern xenon short-arc lamps use a fused quartz envelope with thoriated tungsten electrodes. Fused quartz is the only economically feasible material currently available that can withstand the high pressure (25 atmospheres for an IMAX bulb) and high temperature present in an operating lamp, while still being optically clear. The thorium dopant in the electrodes greatly enhances their electron emission characteristics. Because tungsten and quartz have different coefficients of thermal expansion, the tungsten electrodes are welded to strips of pure molybdenum metal or Invar alloy, which are then melted into the quartz to form the envelope seal.

Because of the very high power levels involved, large lamps are water-cooled. In those used in IMAX projectors, the electrode bodies are made from solid Invar and tipped with thoriated tungsten. An O-ring seals the tube, so that the naked electrodes do not contact the water. In low power applications the electrodes are too cold for efficient electron emission and are not cooled. In high power applications an additional water cooling circuit for each electrode is necessary. To reduce cost, the water circuits are often not separated and the water needs to be deionized to make it electrically non-conductive, which lets the quartz or some laser media dissolve into the water.

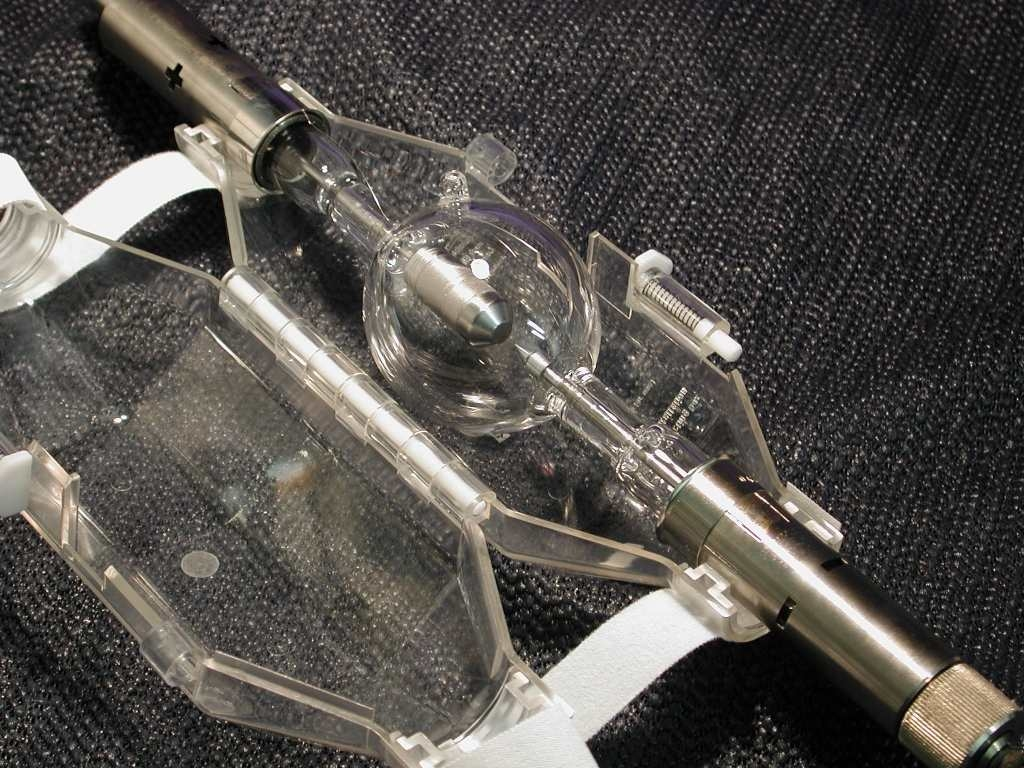
Perspective view of 3 kW lamp showing plastic safety shield used during shipping.

To achieve maximum efficiency, the xenon gas inside short-arc lamps is maintained at an extremely high pressure — up to 30 atmospheres (440 psi / 3040 kPa) — which poses safety concerns. If a lamp is dropped or ruptures while in service, pieces of the lamp envelope can be thrown at high speed. To mitigate this, large xenon short-arc lamps are normally shipped in protective shields, which will contain the envelope fragments should breakage occur. Normally, the shield is removed once the lamp is installed in the lamp housing. When the lamp reaches the end of its useful life, the protective shield is put back on the lamp, and the spent lamp is then removed from the equipment and discarded. As lamps age, the risk of failure increases, so bulbs being replaced are at the greatest risk of explosion.

== Light generation mechanism ==
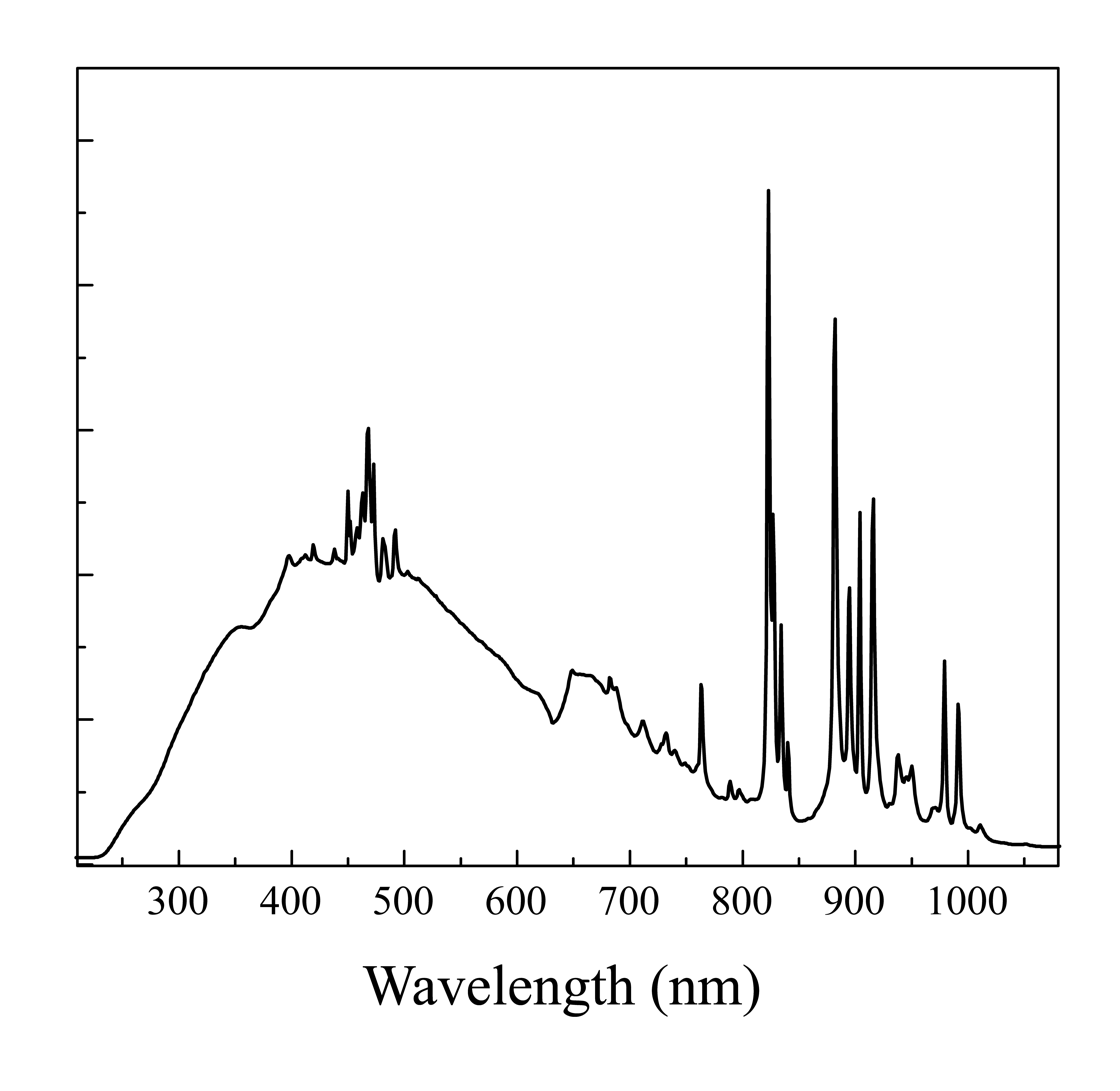
Output profile of a xenon arc lamp.

Xenon short-arc lamps come in two distinct varieties: pure xenon, which contains only xenon gas; and xenon-mercury, which contains xenon gas and a small amount of mercury metal.

=== Pure xenon ===
In a pure xenon lamp, the majority of the light is generated within a tiny, pinpoint-sized cloud of plasma situated where the electron stream leaves the face of the cathode. The light generation volume is cone-shaped, and the luminous intensity falls off exponentially moving from cathode to anode. Electrons passing through the plasma cloud strike the anode, causing it to heat. As a result, the anode in a xenon short-arc lamp either has to be much larger than the cathode or be water-cooled, to dissipate the heat. The output of a pure xenon short-arc lamp offers fairly continuous spectral power distribution with a color temperature of about 6200K and color rendering index close to 100. However, even in a high pressure lamp there are some very strong emission lines in the near infrared, roughly in the region from 850 to 900 nm. This spectral region can contain about 10% of the total emitted light. Light intensity ranges from 20,000 to 500,000 cd/cm^{2}. An example is the "XBO lamp", which is an OSRAM trade name for a pure xenon short-arc lamp.

For some applications, such as endoscopy and dental technology, light guide systems are included.

=== Xenon-mercury ===
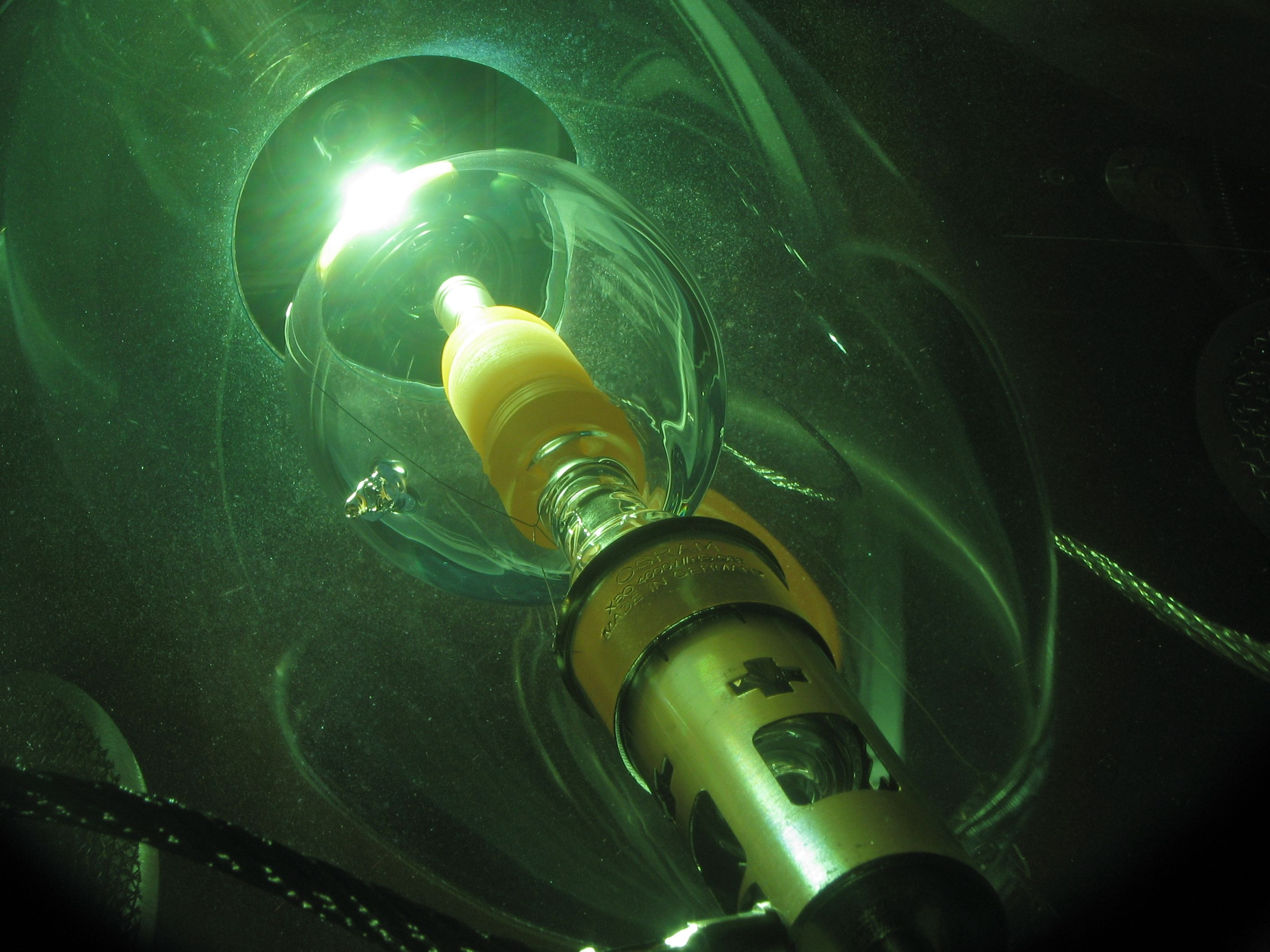
A xenon arc lamp (Osram XBO 4000W).

As in a pure xenon lamp, the majority of the light produced radiates from a pinpoint-sized cloud of plasma near the face of the cathode. However, the plasma cloud in a xenon-mercury lamp is often smaller than that of a pure xenon lamp of equivalent size, due to the electron stream losing its energy more rapidly to the heavier mercury atoms. Xenon-mercury short-arc lamps have a bluish-white spectrum and extremely high UV output. These lamps are used primarily for UV curing applications, sterilizing objects, and generating ozone.

== Ceramic xenon lamps ==
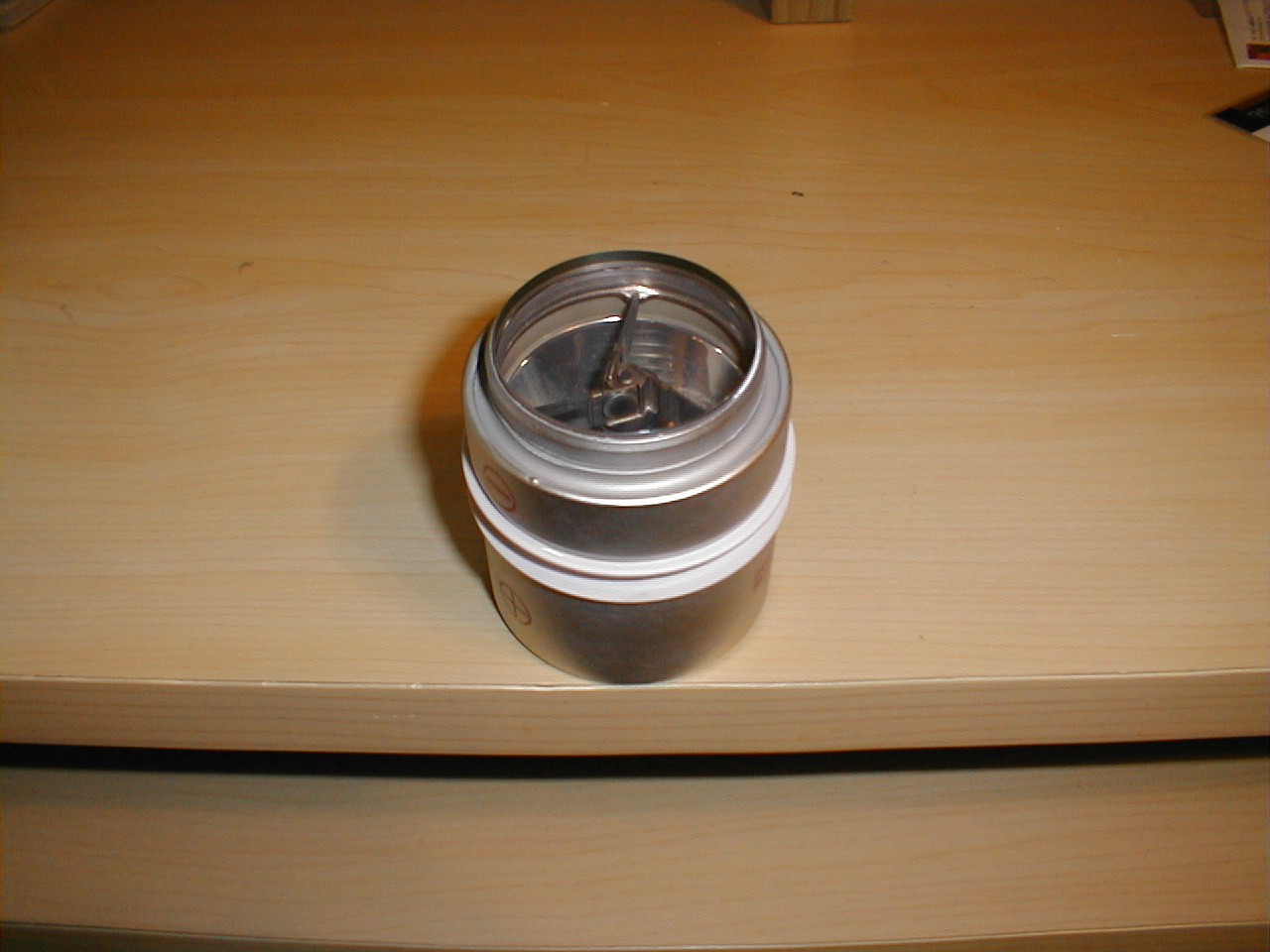
A Cermax 2 kW xenon lamp from a video projector. A pair of heatsinks are clamped on the two metal bands around the perimeter, which also double to supply power to the lamp's electrodes.

Xenon short-arc lamps also are manufactured with a ceramic body and an integral reflector. They are available in many output power ratings with either UV-transmitting or blocking windows. The reflector options are parabolic (for collimated light) or elliptical (for focused light). They are used in a wide variety of applications, such as video projectors, fiber optic illuminators, endoscope and headlamp lighting, dental lighting, and search lights.

== Power supply requirements ==
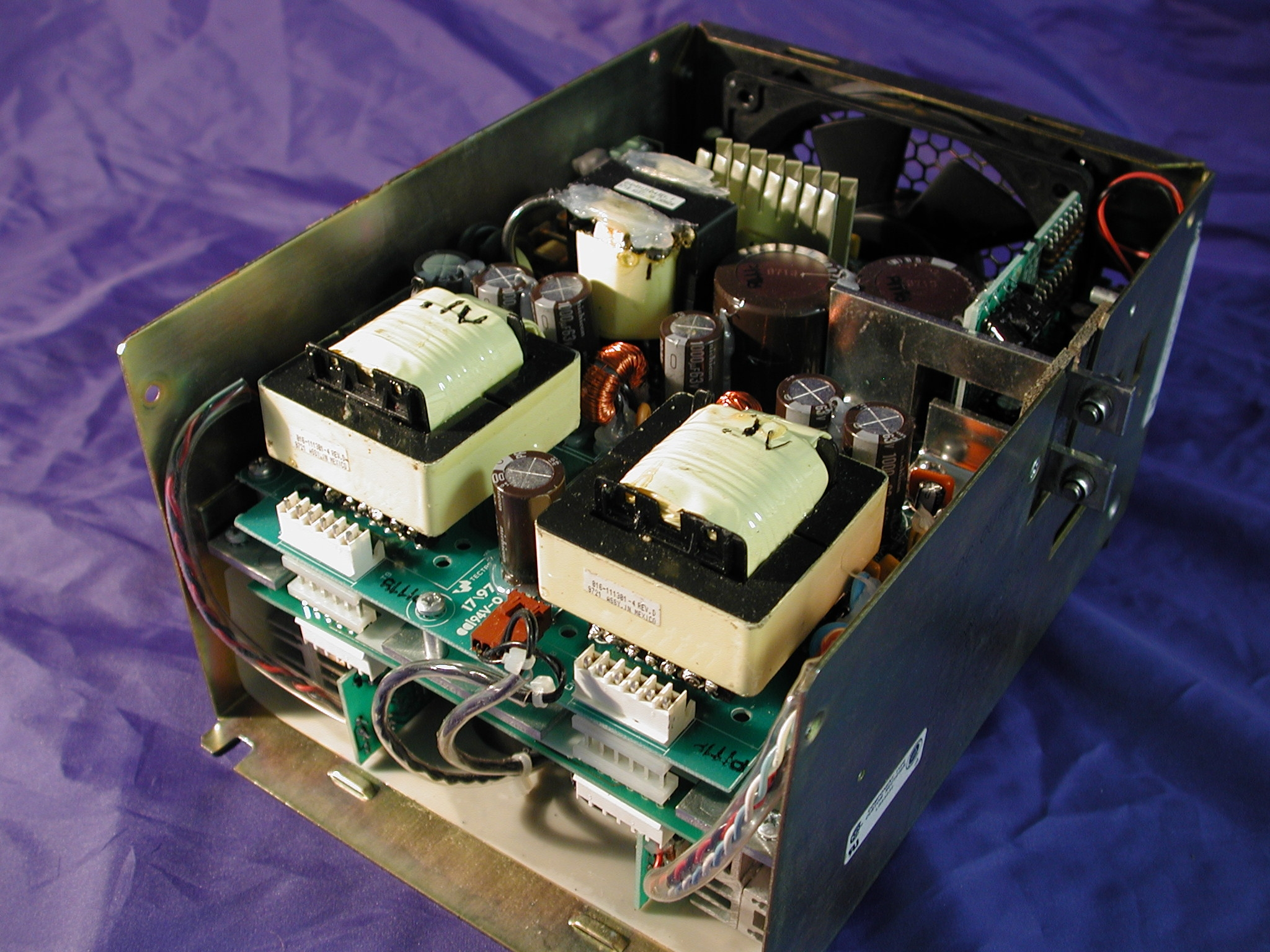
A 1 kW xenon short-arc lamp power supply with the cover removed.

Xenon short-arc lamps have a negative temperature coefficient like other gas discharge lamps. They are operated at low-voltage, high-current, DC and started by field emission with a high voltage pulse of 20 to 50kV. As an example, a 450 W lamp operates normally at 18 V and 25 A once started. They are also inherently unstable, prone to phenomena such as plasma oscillation and thermal runaway. Because of these characteristics, xenon short-arc lamps require a proper power supply that operates without flickering in the flame, which could ultimately damage the electrodes.

== Xenon long-arc-lamps ==
These are structurally similar to short-arc lamps except that the distance between the electrodes in glass tube is greatly elongated. When mounted within an elliptical reflector, these lamps are frequently used to simulate sunlight in brief flashes, often for photography. Typical uses include solar cell testing (with the use of optical filters), solar simulation for age testing of materials, rapid thermal processing, material inspection and sintering.

Though not commonly known outside of Russia and the former Soviet satellite countries, long arc xenon lamps were used for general illumination of large areas such as rail stations, sports arenas, mining operations, and nuclear power plant high bay spaces. These lamps, Лампа ксеноновая ДКСТ, literally "lamp xenon DKST" were characterized by high power ranging from 2 kW to 100 kW. The lamps operated in a peculiar discharge regime where the plasma was thermalized, that is, the electrons were not significantly hotter than the gas itself. Under these conditions a positive current-voltage curve was demonstrated. This allowed the larger common sizes such as 5 and 10 kW to operate directly from mains AC at 110 and 220 volts respectively without a ballast – only a series igniter was necessary to start the arc.

The lamps produced around 30 lumens/watt, which is about double the efficiency of the tungsten incandescent lamp, but less than more modern sources such as metal halide. They had the advantage of no mercury content, convective air cooling, no high pressure rupture risk, and nearly perfect color rendition. Due to low efficiency and competition from more common lamp types, few installations remain today, but where they do, they can be recognized by a characteristic rectangular/elliptical reflector, and crisp blue-white light from a relatively long tubular source.

== See also ==
- List of light sources
