= Solar simulator =

Device that approximates natural sunlight

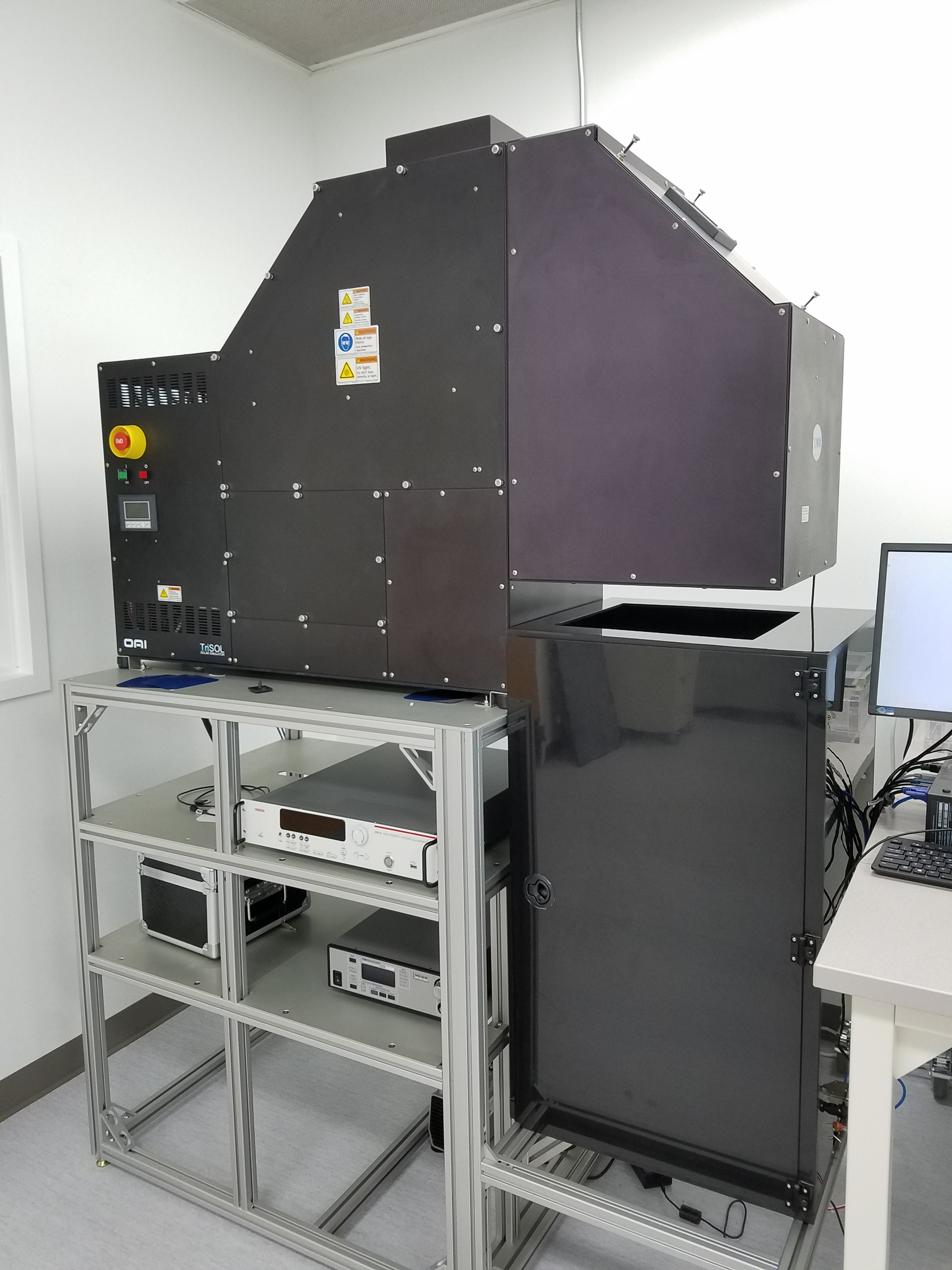
Laboratory class AAA solar simulator

A solar simulator (also artificial sun or sunlight simulator) is a device that provides illumination approximating natural sunlight. The purpose of the solar simulator is to provide a controllable indoor test facility under laboratory conditions. It can be used for the testing of any processes or materials that are photosensitive, including solar cells, sun screen, cosmetics, plastics, aerospace materials, skin cancer, bioluminescence, photosynthesis, water treatment, crude-oil degradation, and free radical formation. Solar simulators are used in a wide range of research areas including photobiology, photo-oxidation, photodegradation, photovoltaics, and photocatalysis.

== Classification ==
The standards specifying performance requirements of solar simulators used in photovoltaic testing are IEC 60904-9, ASTM E927-19, and JIS C 8912. These standards specify the following dimensions of control for light from a solar simulator:

1. spectral content (quantified as spectral match)
2. spatial uniformity
3. temporal stability
4. Spectral Coverage (SPC) (IEC 60904-9:2020 only)
5. Spectral Deviation (SPD) (IEC 60904-9:2020 only)

A solar simulator is specified according to its performance in the first three of the above dimensions, each in one of three classes: A, B, or C. (A fourth classification, A+, was introduced by the 2020 edition of IEC 60904-9 and only applies for solar simulators evaluated in the spectral range of 300 nm to 1200 nm.) For ASTM E927-19, if a solar simulator falls outside the A, B, C criteria, it is considered Class U (unclassified). Although these standards were originally defined specifically for photovoltaic testing, the metrics they introduced have become a common way of specifying solar simulators more broadly in other applications and industries.

The ASTM E927-19 specifications required for each class and dimension are defined in Table 1 below. A solar simulator meeting class A specifications in all three dimensions is referred to as a Class AAA solar simulator (referring to the first three dimensions listed above).

Table 1: Solar Simulator Classifications
Classification	Spectral Match (all intervals)	Spatial Non-uniformity of irradiance	Temporal Instability of irradiance	Applicable Standards
Class A+	0.875–1.125	1%	1%	IEC 60904-9:2020, from 300 nm–1200 nm
Class A	0.75–1.25	2%	2%	IEC 60904-9, ASTM E927, JIS C 8912
Class B	0.6–1.4	5%	5%	IEC 60904-9, ASTM E927, JIS C 8912
Class C	0.4–2.0	10%	10%	IEC 60904-9, ASTM E927, JIS C 8912
Class U (unclassified)	> 2.0	> 10%	> 10%	ASTM E927

The ASTM E927-19 standard specifies that whenever this triple-letter format is used to describe a solar simulator, it needs to be made clear which classification applies to each solar simulator metric (e.g. a Class ABA solar simulator needs to make clear which parameter(s) are Class A vs. B).

The IEC 60904-9 standard specifies that the three letters must be in order of spectral match, non-uniformity, and temporal instability.

=== Spectral match ===
A solar simulator's spectral match is computed by comparing its output spectrum to the integrated irradiance in several wavelength intervals. The reference percentage of total irradiance is shown below in Table 2 for the standard terrestrial spectra of AM1.5G and AM1.5D, and the extraterrestrial spectrum, AM0. Below is a plot of these two spectra.

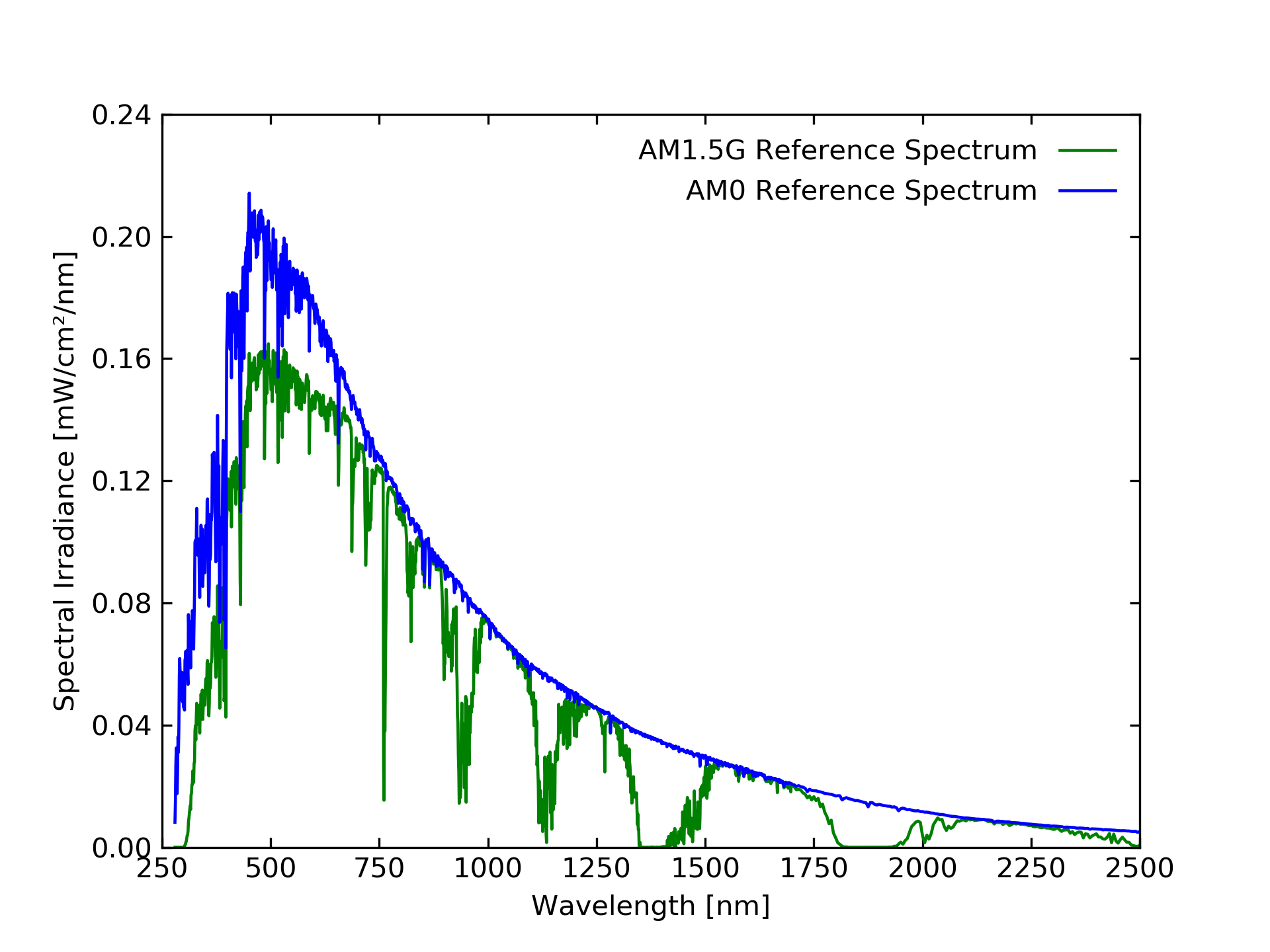
Reference Spectra for sunlight at ground-level (AM1.5G) and in outer space (AM0).

A solar simulator's spectral match ratio, $R_{SM}$ (i.e. ratio of spectral match), is its percentage output irradiance divided by that of the reference spectrum in that wavelength interval. For example, if a solar simulator emits 17.8 percent of its total irradiance in the 400 nm–500 nm range, it would have a $R_{SM}$ in that wavelength interval of 0.98. If a solar simulator achieves a spectral match ratio $R_{SM}$ between 0.75 and 1.25 for all wavelength intervals, it is considered to have class A spectral match.

Table 2: ASTM Percentage of Total Irradiance for three standard spectra
Wavelength Interval [nm]	AM1.5D	AM1.5G	AM0
300–400	no spec	no spec	4.67%
400–500	16.75%	18.21%	16.80%
500–600	19.49%	19.73%	16.68%
600–700	18.36%	18.20%	14.28%
700–800	15.08%	14.79%	11.31%
800–900	12.82%	12.39%	8.98%
900–1100	16.69%	15.89%	13.50%
1100–1400	no spec	no spec	12.56%

These wavelength intervals were primarily intended for the solar simulator application of testing silicon photovoltaics, hence the spectral range over which the intervals were defined was limited mainly to the originally-developed absorption region of crystalline silicon (400 nm–1100 nm).

The solar simulator standards have some requirements for where the illumination spectrum must be measured. For example, the IEC 60904-9 standard requires that the spectrum be measured at four different locations in a pattern given below.

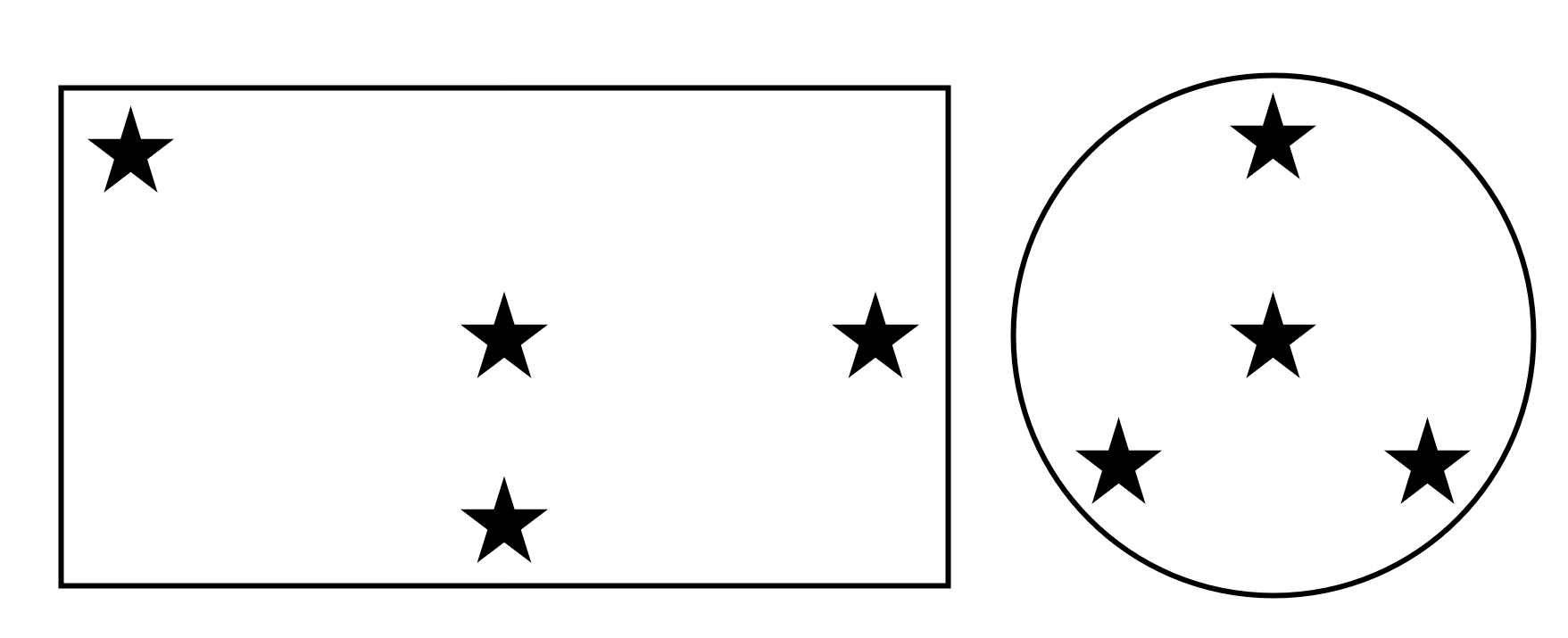
The measurement pattern required for spectral match measurements under IEC 60904:2020

Recent material science developments have expanded the spectral responsivity range of c-Si, multi-c-Si and CIGS solar cells to 300 nm–1200 nm. Therefore, in 2020, the IEC 60904-9 standard introduced a new table of wavelength intervals (given in Table 3 below) aimed to match solar simulator output to the present needs of a wide variety of photovoltaic devices.

Table 3: IEC 60904-9:2020 Percentage of Total Irradiance for AM1.5G
Wavelength Interval [nm]	Percentage of Total Irradiance [%]
300–470	16.61
470–561	16.74
561–657	16.67
657–772	16.63
772–919	16.66
919–1200	16.69

While the above definition of spectral range is adequate for addressing the testing needs of many photovoltaic technologies, including thin film solar cells constructed from CdTe or CIGS, it is not sufficient for testing multi-junction solar cells using high-efficiency III-V semiconductors that have wider absorption bandwidths from 300–1800 nm.

For accurate spectral data outside the above-mentioned ranges, the data tables in ASTM G173 (for AM1.5G and AM1.5D) and ASTM E490 (for AM0) can be used as reference, but the specifications of solar simulators do not yet apply to anything outside 300 nm to 1200 nm for AM1.5G, and 300 nm to 1400 nm for AM0. Many solar simulator manufacturers produce light outside these regions, but the classification of light in these external regions is not yet standardized.

=== Spatial non-uniformity ===
A solar simulator's spatial non-uniformity is computed via the following equation, with the result being a percentage:

$$S_{NE} = 100 \frac{\text{max}(I_s)-\text{min}(I_s)}{\text{max}(I_s)+\text{min}(I_s)}$$

Here, $I_s$ is the array of normalized short-circuit current values detected by a solar cell or array of solar cells. The three solar simulator standards have slightly different requirements for how the array of measurements is gathered for computing spatial non-uniformity. ASTM E927-19 specifies that the illumination field must be measured at a minimum of 64 positions. The area of each test position, $A_{TP}$, is the illumination test area divided by the number of positions. The area of the detector used must be between 0.5 and 1.0 of $A_{TP}$.

=== Temporal instability ===
A solar simulator's temporal instability of irradiance is computed via the following equation, with the result being a percentage:

$$T_{IE} = 100 \frac{\text{max}(I_T)-\text{min}(I_T)}{\text{max}(I_T)+\text{min}(I_T)}$$

Here, $I_T$ is the array of measurements gathered over the period of data acquisition. The solar simulator standards do not specify the required time interval or sampling frequency in absolute terms.

=== Spectral coverage ===
The 2020 update to the IEC 60904-9 standard introduced the spectral coverage (SPC) metric, an additional way of qualifying solar simulators. The value of a solar simulator's spectral coverage does not currently impact its classification, but is requested to be reported under IEC 60904-9:2020. SPC is calculated as follows, and refers to the percentage of a solar simulator's emission that is at least 10 percent of the reference irradiance at a given wavelength:

$$SPC = \left(\sum_{E_{SIM}(\lambda)>0.1\cdot E_{AM1.5}(\lambda)}E_{AM1.5}(\lambda)\cdot \Delta\lambda\Bigg/ \sum_{\text{300 nm}}^{\text{1200 nm}} E_{AM1.5}(\lambda)\cdot \Delta\lambda\right) \cdot 100\%$$

=== Spectral deviation ===
The 2020 update to the IEC 60904-9 standard introduced the spectral deviation (SPD) metric, an additional way of qualifying solar simulators. The value of a solar simulator's spectral deviation does not currently impact its classification, but is requested to be reported under IEC 60904-9:2020.

SPD is calculated as follows, and refers to the total percentage deviation between a solar simulator's emitted spectrum and a reference spectrum:

$$SPD = \left( \sum_{\text{300 nm}}^{\text{1200 nm}} |E_{SIM}(\lambda)-E_{AM1.5}(\lambda)|\cdot \Delta \lambda \Bigg/ \sum_{\text{300 nm}}^{\text{1200 nm}} E_{AM1.5}(\lambda)\cdot \Delta \lambda \right) \cdot 100\%$$

== Types of solar simulators ==
Solar simulators can be divided into two categories according to their emission duration: continuous (or steady-state) and flashed (or pulsed). Solar simulators are also sometimes categorized according to the number of lamps used to generate the spectrum: single-lamp or multi-lamp.

=== Continuous simulators ===
The first type is a familiar form of light source in which illumination is continuous in time, also known as steady-state. The specifications discussed in the previous sections most directly relate to this type of solar simulator. This category is most often used for low intensity testing, from less than 1 sun up to several suns. The total integrated irradiance for the AM1.5G spectrum is 1000.4 $W\cdot m^{-2}$ (280 nm to 4000 nm bandwidth) which is often referred to as '1 sun'. Continuous light (or Continuous-Wave, CW) solar simulators may have several different lamp types combined—such as an arc source and one or more halogen lamps—to extend the spectrum far into the infrared.

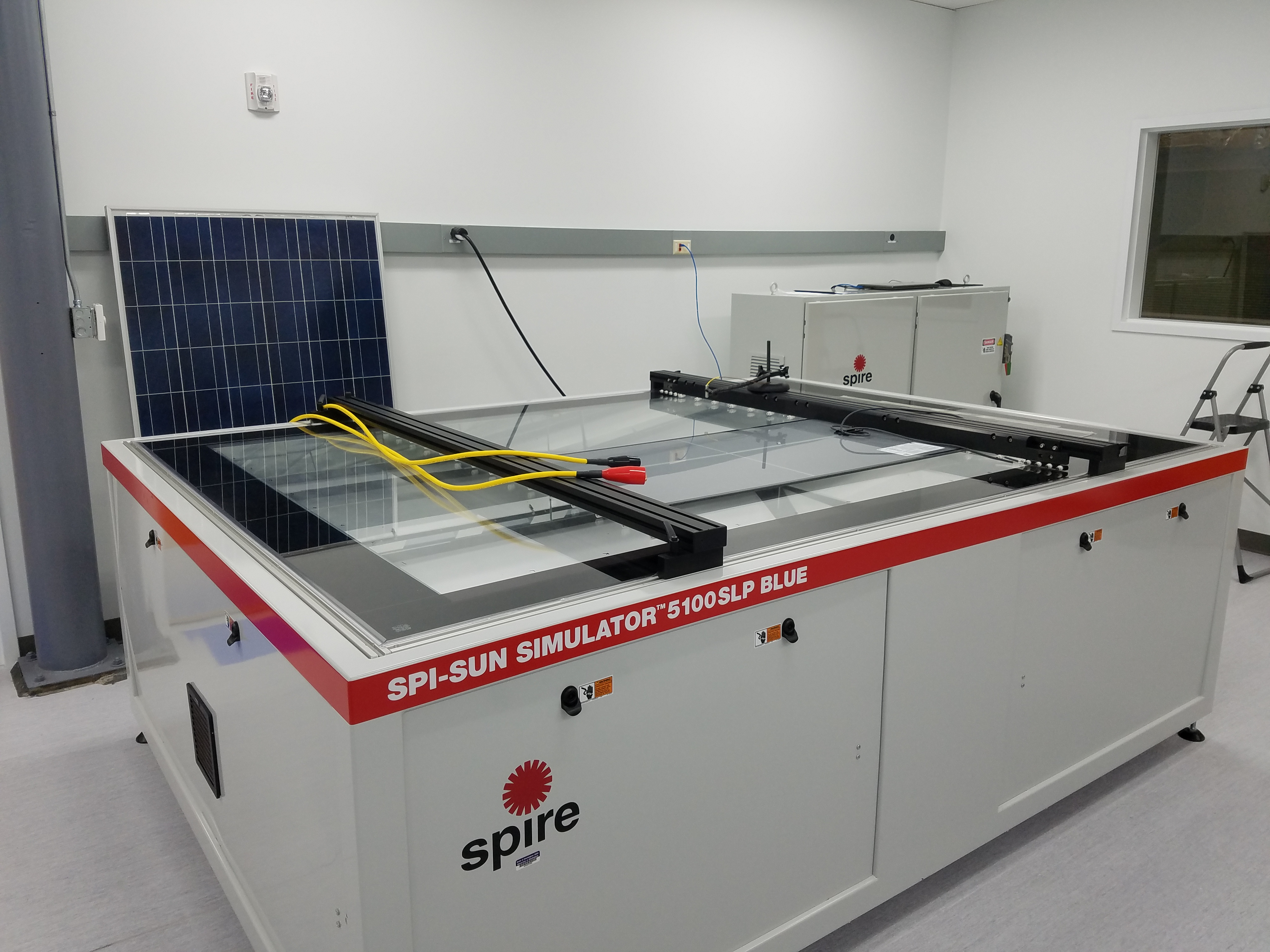
Flash-type solar simulator for testing full modules

=== Flashed solar simulators ===
The second type of solar simulator, also known as a pulsed simulator, is qualitatively similar to flash photography and uses flash tubes. With typical durations of several milliseconds, very high intensities of up to several thousand suns are possible. This type of equipment is often used to prevent unnecessary heat build-up in the device under test. However, due to the rapid heating and cooling of the lamp, the intensity and light spectrum are inherently transient, making repeated reliable testing more technically challenging. Solid-state lamp technology such as LEDs mitigate some of these heating and cooling concerns in flash solar simulators. The solar simulator standards provide guidance for steady-state compared to flashed solar simulators. For example, ASTM E927 section 7.1.6.3 provides guidance on temporal instability measurements for flashed solar simulators.

== Solar simulator construction ==
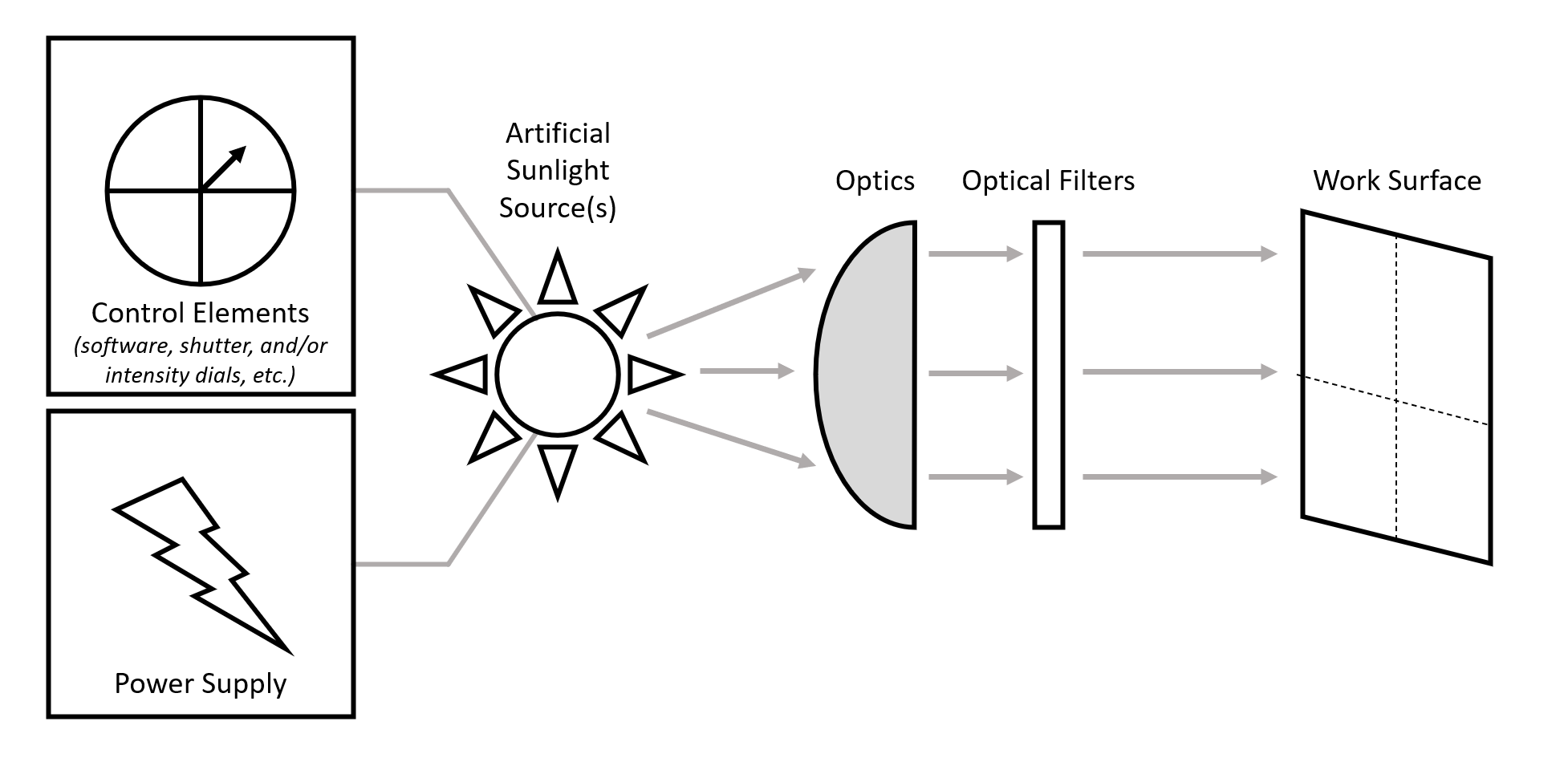
The basic components of a solar simulator

A solar simulator consists of three main parts:

1. Light sources (lamps) and power sources
2. Optics and optical filters, to alter the beam and obtain desired properties
3. Control elements for operation

== Types of lamps ==
Several types of lamps have been used as the light sources within solar simulators. The lamp type is arguably the most important determining factor of a solar simulator's performance limits with respect to intensity, spectral range, illumination pattern, collimation and temporal stability.

=== Argon arc lamps ===
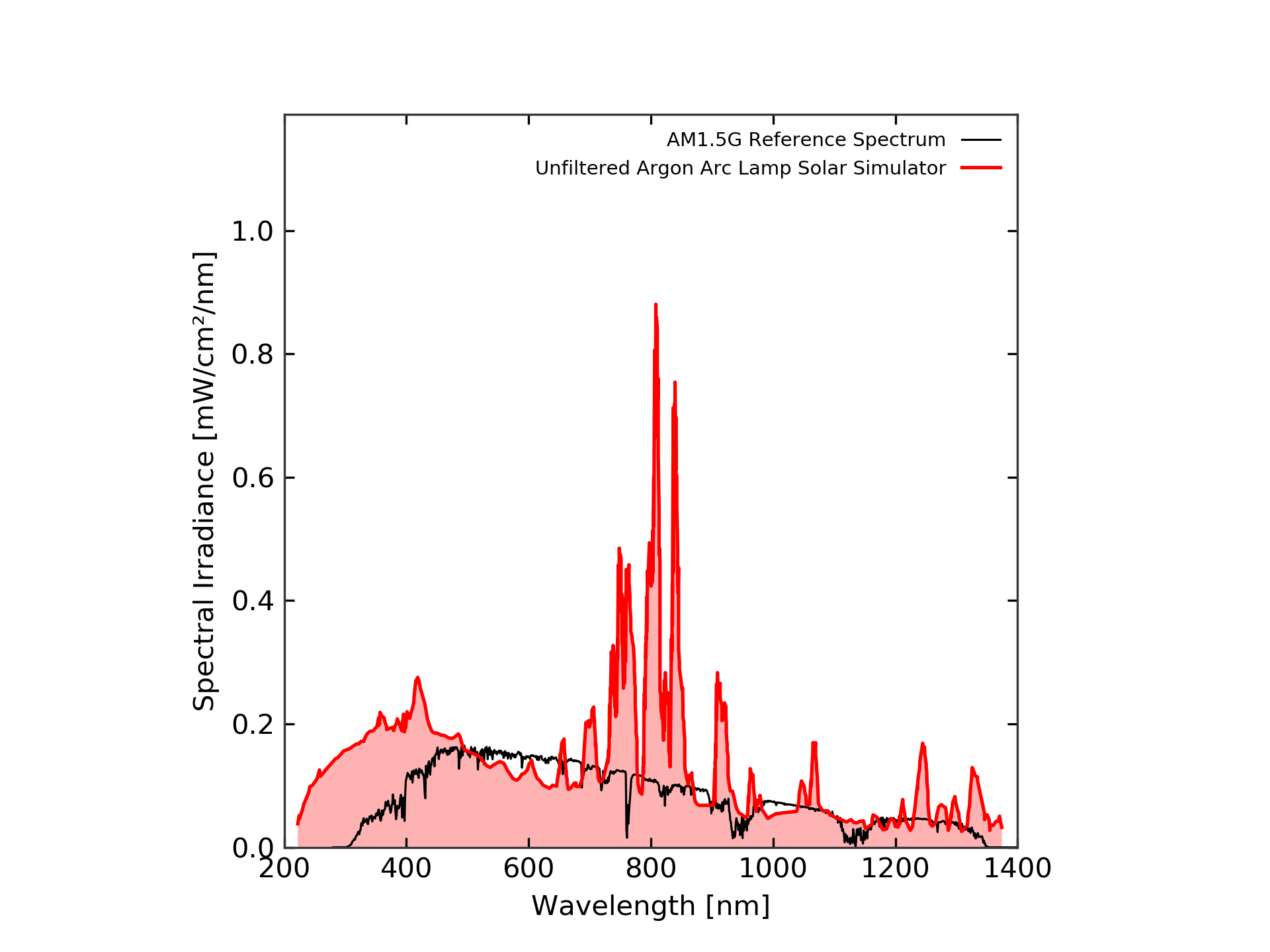
The unfiltered spectral output of an argon arc lamp. Typically an optical filter would be used to achieve a closer spectral match to AM1.5G.

Argon arc lamps were used in early solar simulation studies (1972) and have a high color heat emission of 6500 K, well-matched to the sun's blackbody temperature, with a relatively broad spectral emission from 275 nm to 1525 nm. High-pressure argon gas cycles between an anode and a cathode, with a water vortex flowing along the inside quartz tube wall to cool the arc edge. Argon arc lamps carry the disadvantages of short lifetimes and poor reliability.

=== Carbon arc lamps ===
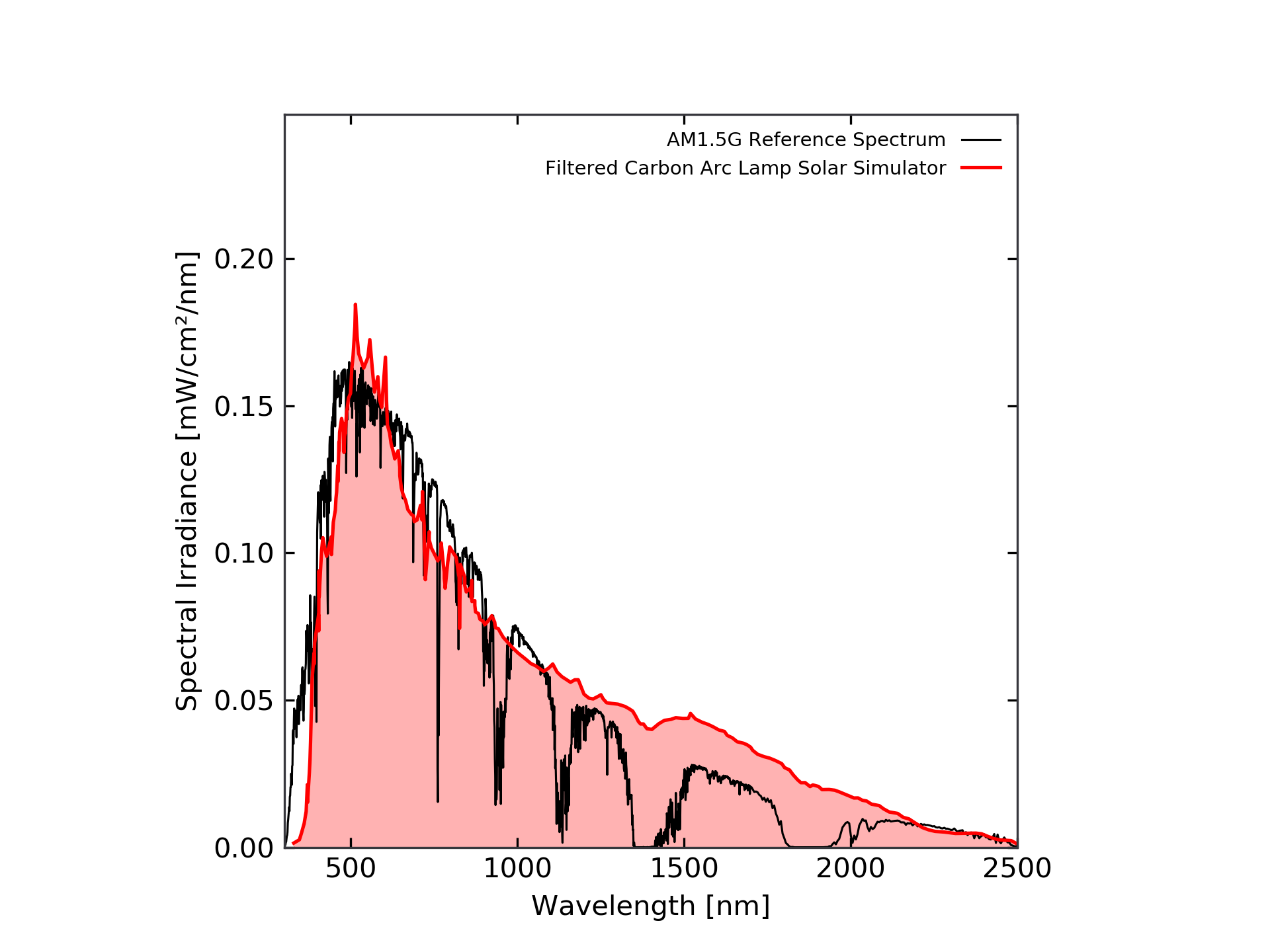
The spectral output of a carbon arc lamp, after passing through an optical filter to achieve better spectral match to AM1.5G

Carbon arc lamps have an emission similar to AM0 and are therefore used for solar simulators designed to produce extrasolar spectra. (They were used for NASA's first space simulators.) Carbon arc lamps benefit from higher-intensity UV emission. However, they have the disadvantage of being generally weaker in intensity than similar xenon arc lamps. In addition, they have a short lifetime, are unstable during operation and emit high-intensity blue light mismatched to the solar spectrum.

=== Light-emitting diodes ===
Since approximately the year 2000, Light-emitting diodes (LEDs) have become commonly used in PV solar simulators. LEDs emit light when electron-hole pairs recombine. They are low-cost and compact with low power consumption. They typically have narrow bandwidths of the order of 10 nm–100 nm, so multiple LEDs must be combined in a solar simulator. As such, the spectral match of an LED solar simulator is largely determined by the number and types of LEDs used in its design. LEDs can be accurately controlled to time windows less than a millisecond for steady or flashed solar simulator applications. Additionally, LEDs have a relatively long life cycle compared to all other solar simulator lamp types, and are very efficient in energy conversion. Ongoing research and development on LEDs is continually driving down their cost and expanding their spectral coverage, allowing them to be increasingly employed in wider-spectrum solar simulators. LED solar simulators are unique in that their spectra can be tuned electrically (by increasing or decreasing the intensity of various LEDs) without the need for optical filters. Compared to xenon arc lamps, LEDs have demonstrated equivalent results in IV testing of photovoltaic modules with better stability, flexibility and spectral match. Because LED emission is somewhat sensitive to junction temperature, LEDs have the disadvantage of requiring adequate thermal management.

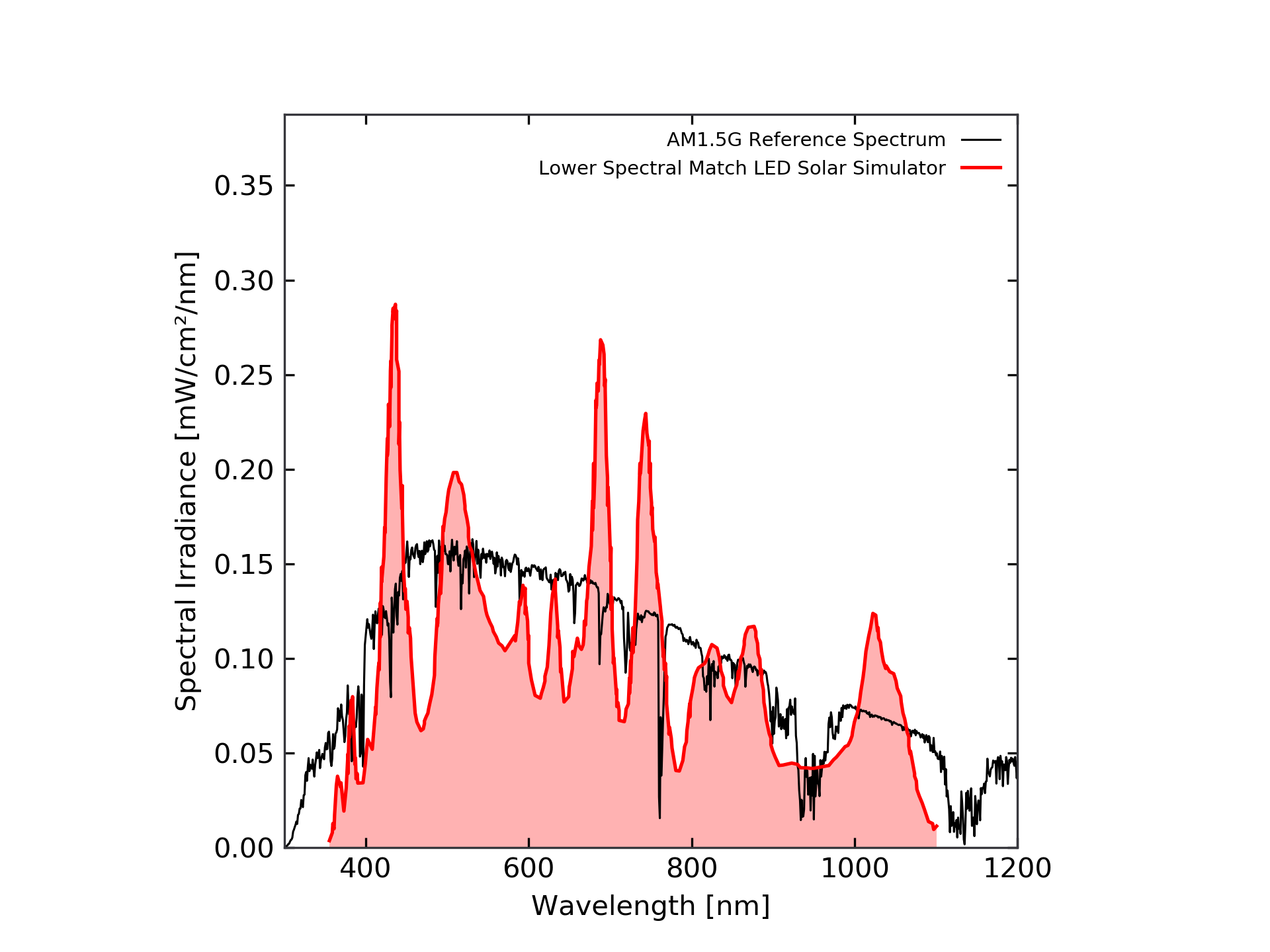
The simulated spectral output of an LED solar simulator, showing relatively lower spectral match because of the LEDs used

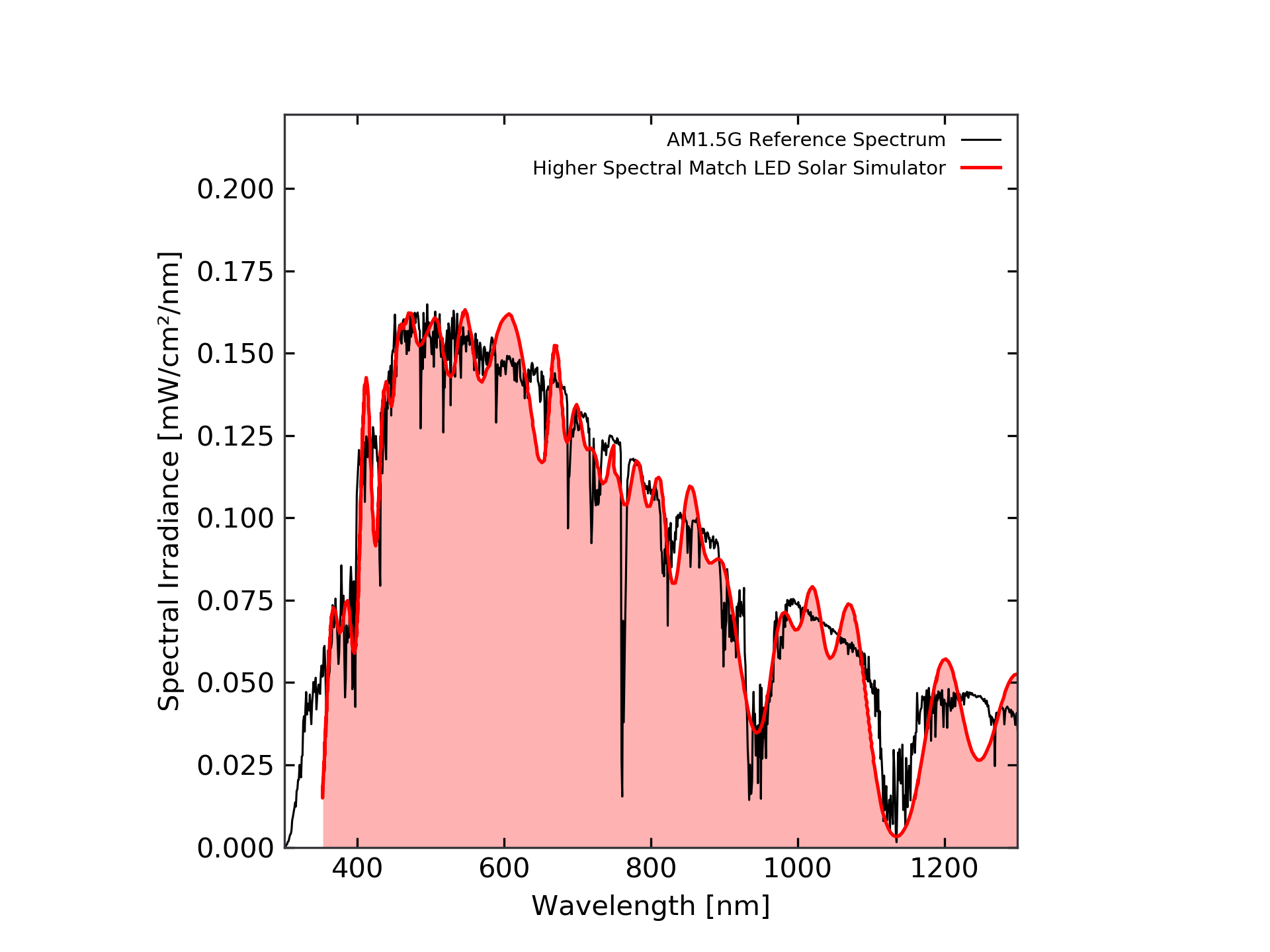
The simulated spectral output of an LED solar simulator, showing relatively higher spectral match because of the LEDs used

=== Metal halide arc lamps ===
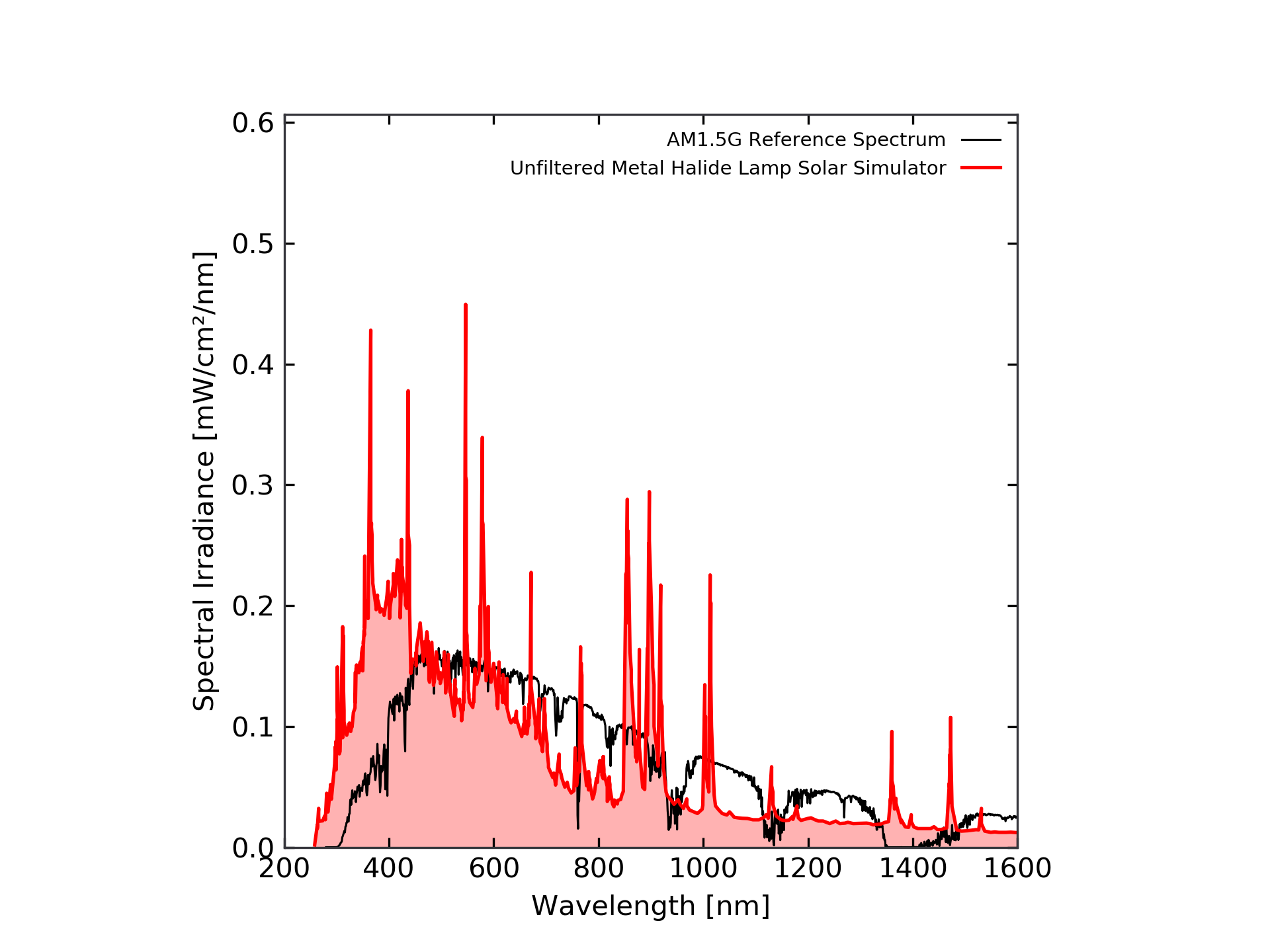
The unfiltered spectral output of a metal halide lamp. Typically an optical filter would be used to achieve a closer spectral match to AM1.5G.

Metal Halide arc lamps were primarily developed for use in film and television lighting, where a high temporal stability and daylight colour match are required. However, for these same properties, metal halide arc lamps are also used in solar simulation. These lamps produce light through a high-intensity discharge (HID) by passing an electric arc through vapourized high-pressure mercury and metal halide compounds. Their disadvantages include high power consumption, high electronic driver costs, and short life cycles. However, they have the benefit of relatively low costs, and because of this low cost, many large-area solar simulators have been built with this technology.

=== Quartz-tungsten halogen lamps ===
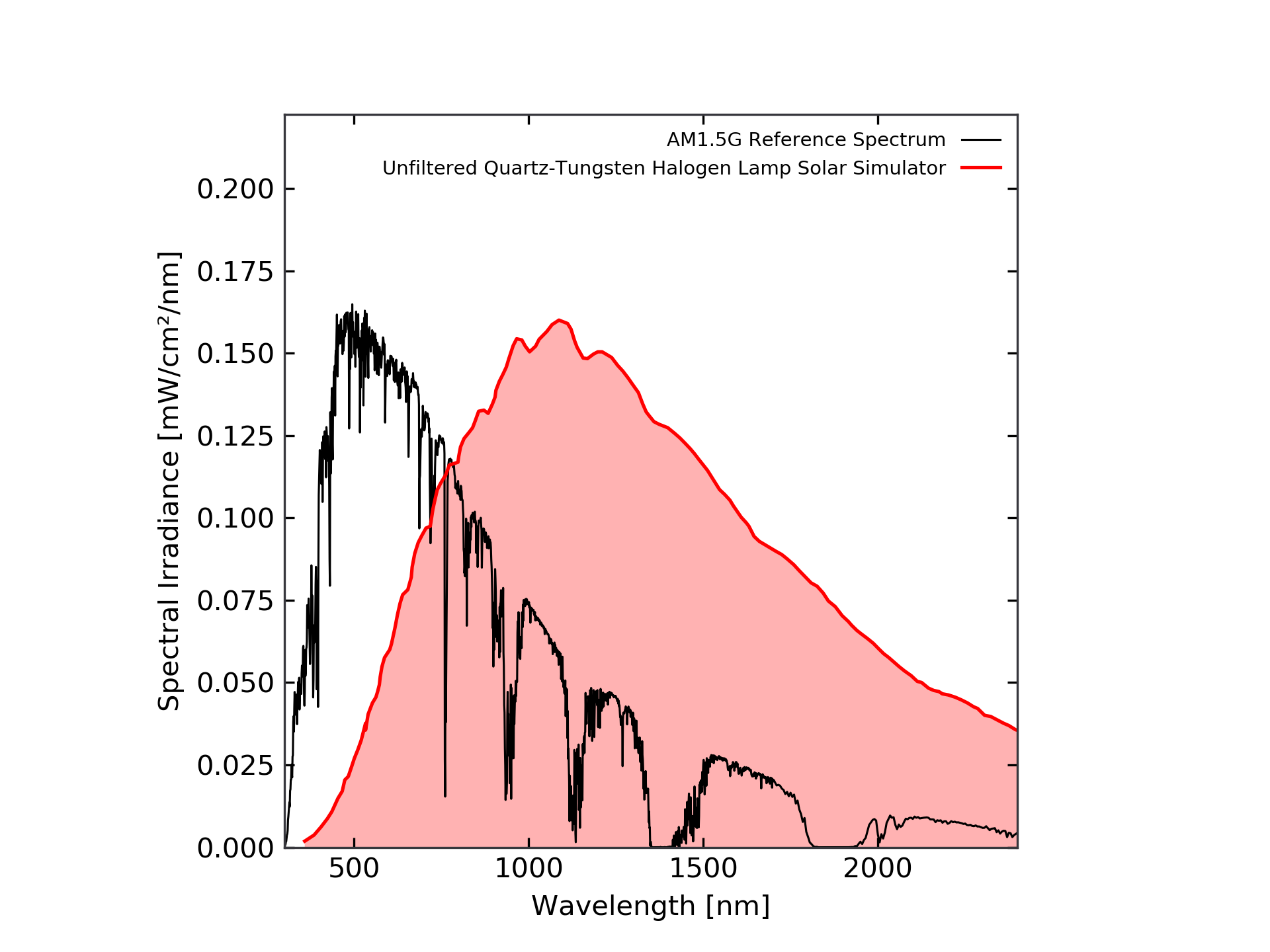
The unfiltered spectral output of a quartz-tungsten halogen lamp. Typically, an optical filter would be used to achieve a closer spectral match to AM1.5G

Quartz-tungsten halogen lamps (QTH lamps) offer spectra which very closely match black body radiation, although typically with a lower color temperature than the sun.They are a type of incandescent lamp where a halogen such as bromine or iodine surrounds a heated tungsten filament. Their disadvantage is that they have a maximum color temperature of 3400 K, meaning they produce less UV and more IR emission than sunlight. They are high-intensity. and low-cost, and are widely used in less spectrum-sensitive applications such as concentrated solar collector testing.

=== Supercontinuum laser ===
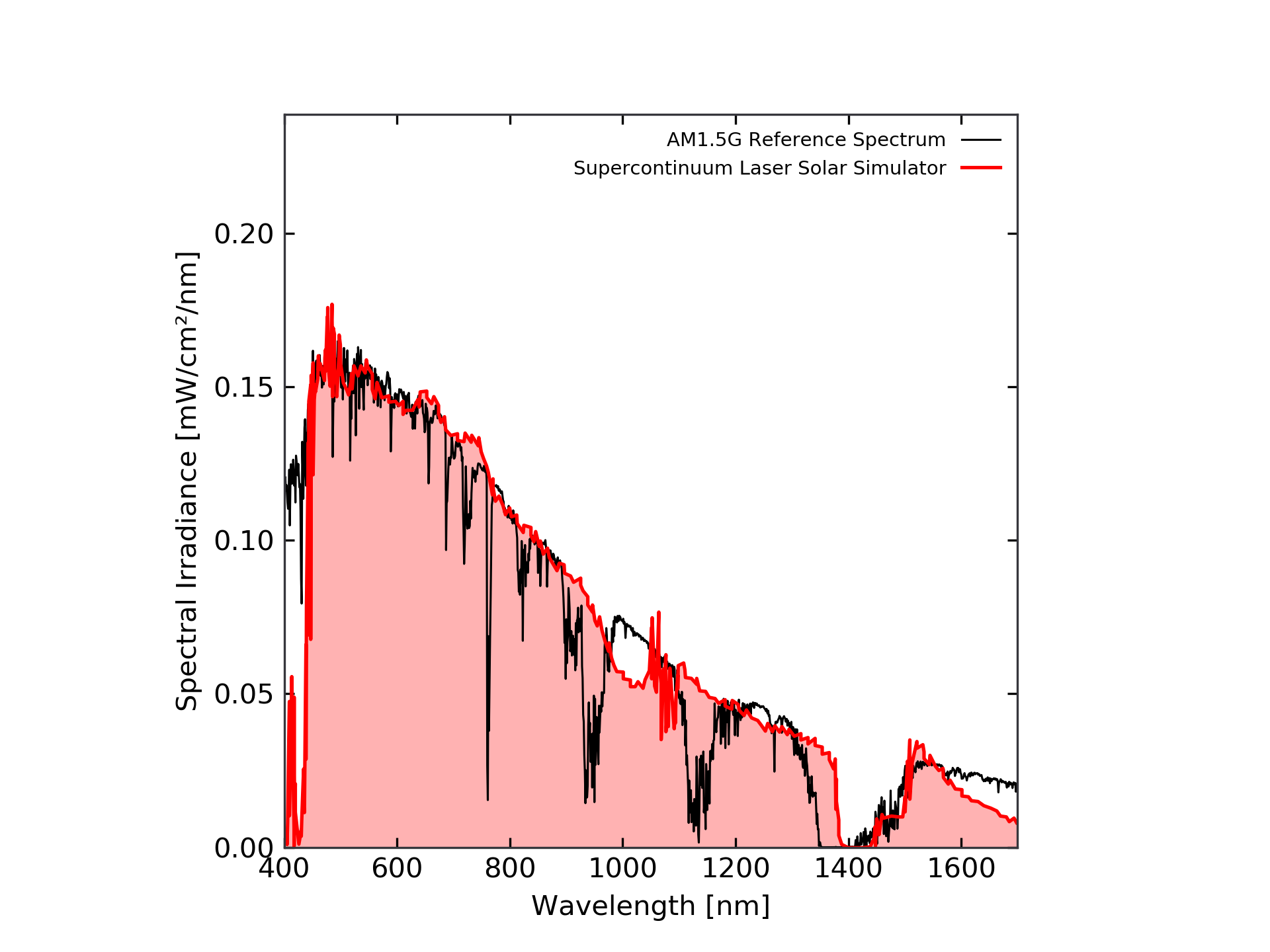
The spectral output of a supercontinuum laser solar simulator

A super continuum laser is a source of high-power, broadband light that can range from the visible range to the IR. Lasers are high-intensity and easy to focus, but have the disadvantage of only illuminating very small areas. Their high intensities, however, allow for testing of photovoltaic modules in solar concentrator applications.

=== Xenon arc lamps ===
Xenon arc lamps are the most common type of lamp both for continuous and flashed solar simulators. They are a type of high-intensity discharge (HID) lamp where light is produced from an electric arc through ionized, high-pressure xenon gas. These lamps offer high intensities and an unfiltered spectrum which matches reasonably well to sunlight. Furthermore, these lamps exhibit no significant spectral balance shift due to differences in power, reducing the need for power source stability. Because they emit high intensities from a single bulb, a collimated high-intensity beam can be produced from a xenon arc lamp. However, the xenon arc lamp spectrum is characterized by many undesirable sharp atomic transitional peaks, as well as generally stronger emission in the infrared, making the spectrum less desirable for some spectrally sensitive applications. These emission peaks are typically filtered using glass filters. Xenon lamps carry many disadvantages, including a high power consumption, a need for constant maintenance, a short life cycle, a high cost, an output sensitivity to power supply instabilities, a risk of bulb explosion due to their operation via high-pressure gas, and an ozone respiratory hazard due to ozone production from UV radiation.

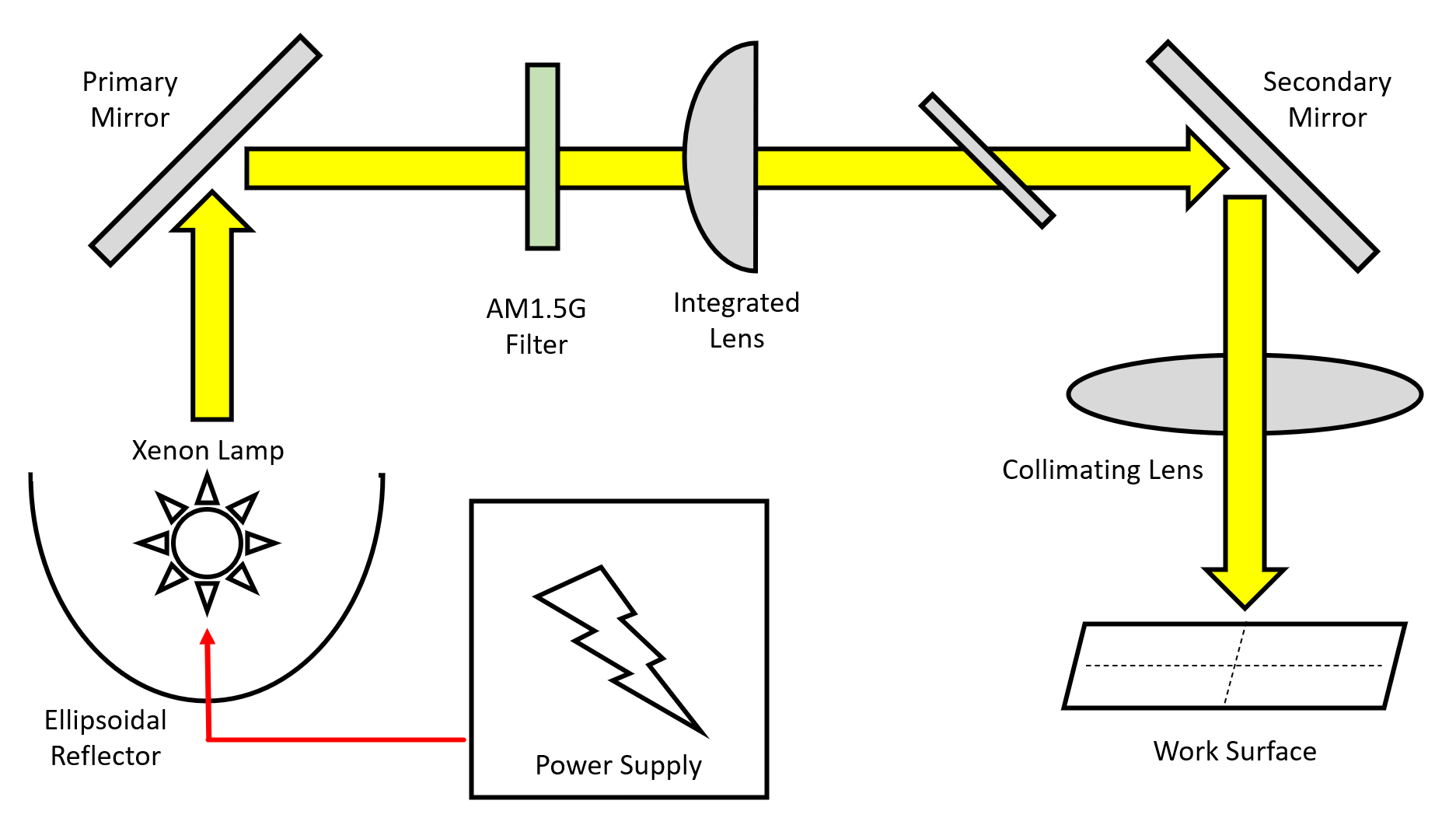
Example schematic of a Xenon Arc Lamp Solar Simulator

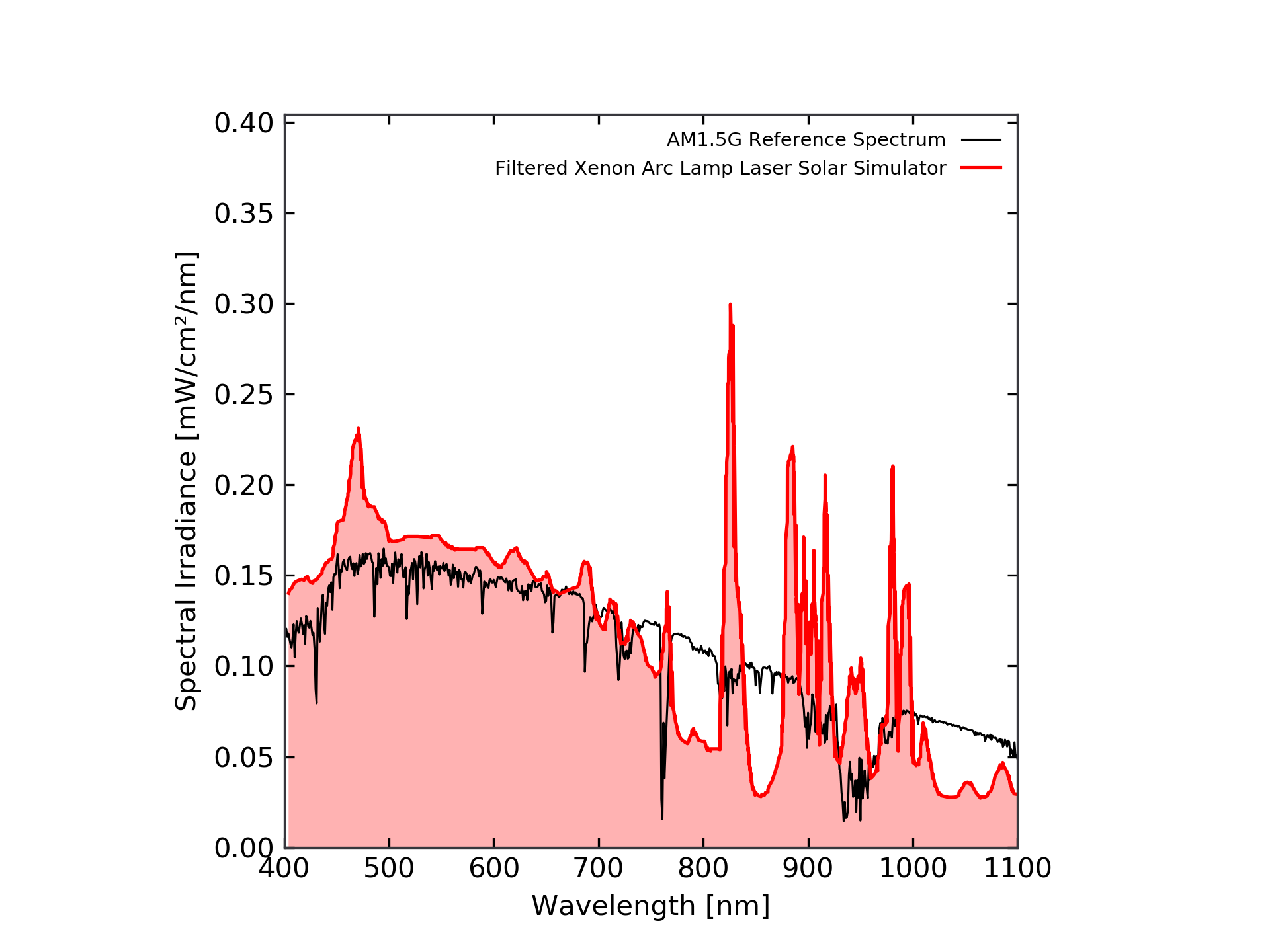
The spectral output of a xenon arc lamp, after passing through an optical filter to achieve better spectral match to AM1.5G
