= Robert Fischell =

American physicist

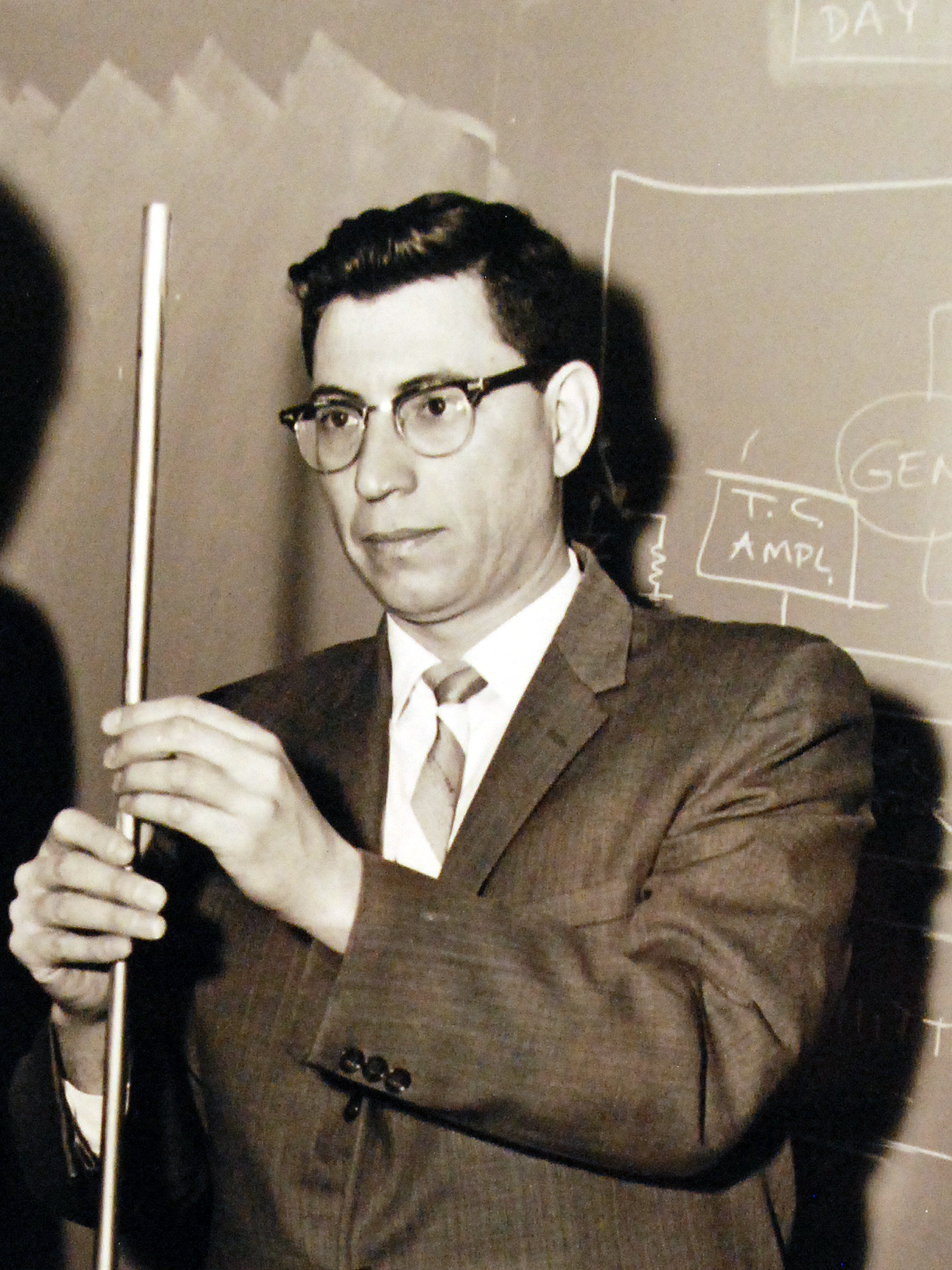
Robert Fischell in 1963

Robert Fischell (born February 10, 1929) is a physicist, prolific inventor, and holder of more than 200 U.S. and foreign medical patents. His inventions have led to the creation of several biotechnology companies. He worked at the Johns Hopkins University Applied Physics Laboratory full-time for 25 years and part-time for an additional 13 years. He contributed to APL's satellite navigation work; he later developed a rechargeable implantable pacemaker that could be programmed with radiowaves, (Pacesetter Systems purchased by Siemens, now the CRM division of St. Jude Medical). He and his team at Hopkins also helped miniaturize the implantable cardiac defibrillator. Mr. Fischell went on to invent the implantable insulin pump (MiniMed, spun off from Pacesetter Systems in 1985), numerous coronary stents used to open clogged arteries (IsoStent merged with Cordis, in turn purchased by Johnson & Johnson), and two feedback systems that provide early warning of epileptic seizures (NeuroPace) and heart attacks (Angel Medical Systems). Fischell recently donated $30 million to the University of Maryland College Park Foundation to establish a bioengineering department and an institute for biomedical devices at the A. James Clark School of Engineering.

In 2005, he was awarded the TED Prize, receiving $100,000 and three wishes, including a braintrust on medical liability and the successful design of a device to cure migraines.

Fischell received his B.S. in mechanical engineering from Duke University in 1951, where he became a brother of Zeta Beta Tau. He received his M.S. from the University of Maryland in 1953 in physics, which is part of the University of Maryland College of Computer, Mathematical, and Natural Sciences. Fischell was awarded an honorary doctorate from the University of Maryland in 1996.

He has three sons (from oldest to youngest), David, Tim, and Scott Fischell. He is married to Susan R. Fischell, and they live in Maryland.

He was awarded the National Medal of Technology and Innovation in 2016.
