= Pacesetter Systems =

Former biotechnology company

Pacesetter Systems Inc. was a biotechnology company founded by Alfred E. Mann in 1965. The company manufactured various implantable medical devices invented by Robert Fischell and the rest of the team at the Johns Hopkins University Applied Physics Laboratory. Those inventions included the first commercial rechargeable implantable pacemaker, which was one of the first pacemakers to use radio waves for telemetry, and the implantable insulin pump. The insulin pump business was spun off into MiniMed in 1983 and then acquired by Medtronic in 2001. Pacesetter Systems Inc. was purchased by Siemens and then St. Jude Medical in 1994.
