= Air-to-surface missile =

Missile designed to be launched from aircraft

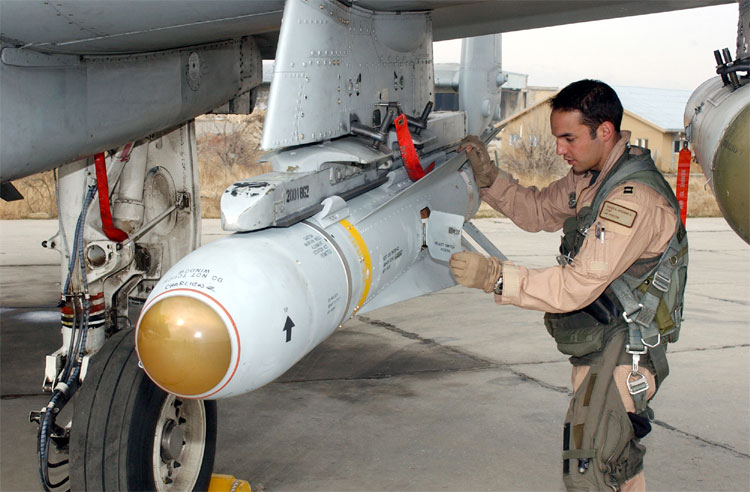
A pilot inspects an AGM-65 Maverick missile on his A-10 Thunderbolt II.

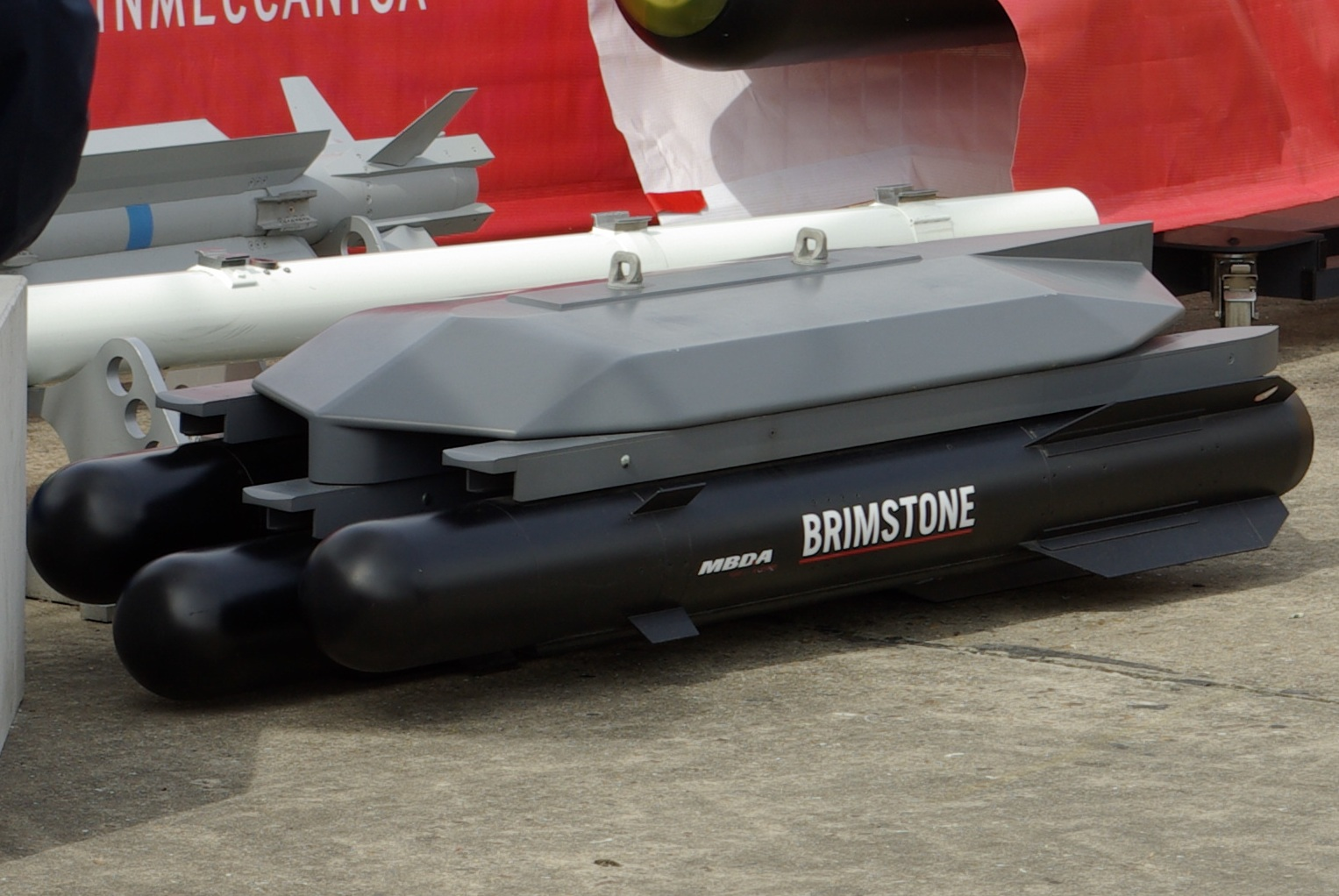
The RAF's Brimstone missile is a fire and forget anti-tank missile.

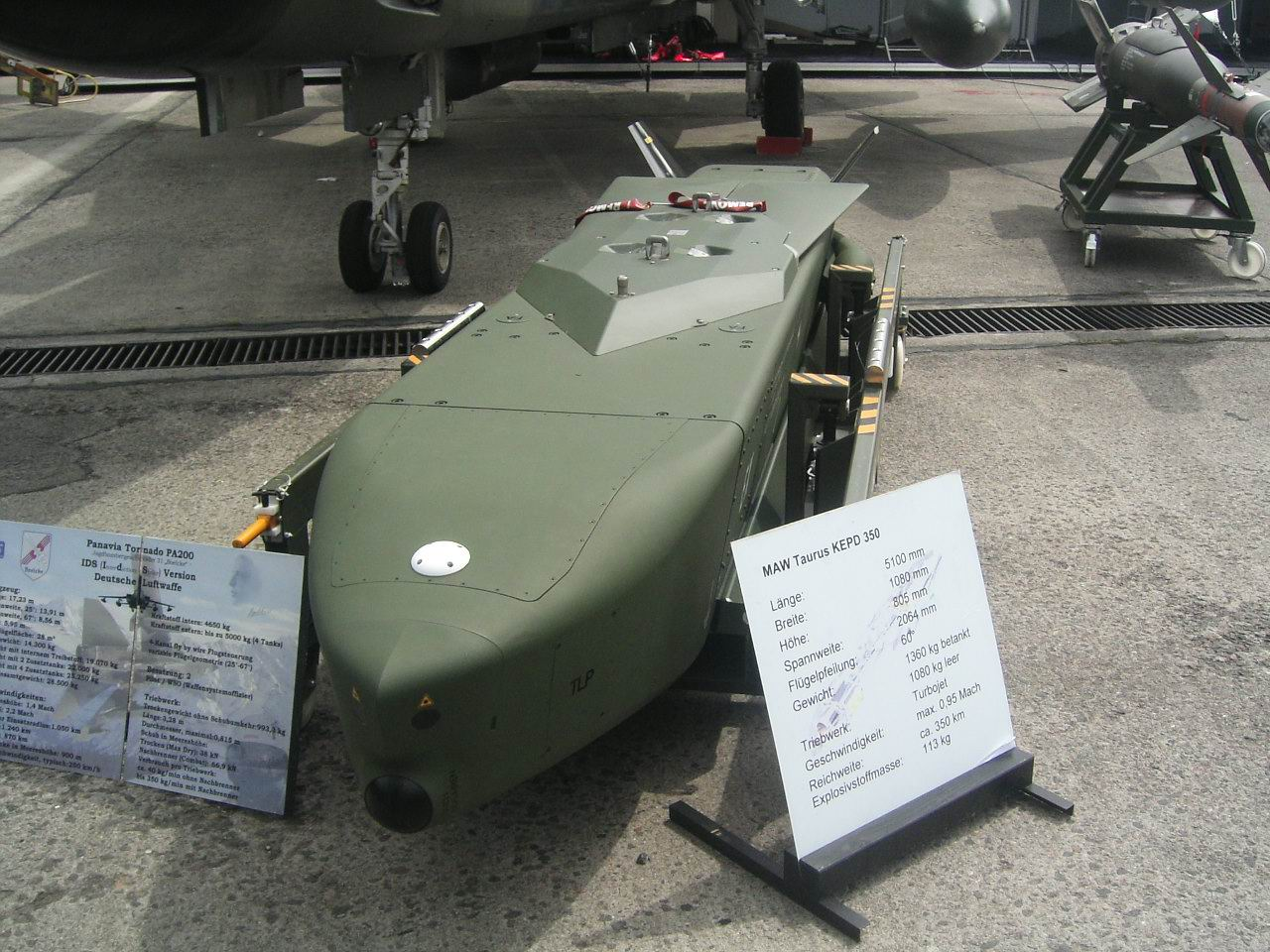
A Taurus KEPD 350 cruise missile of the German Luftwaffe

An air-to-surface missile (ASM) or air-to-ground missile (AGM) is a missile designed to be launched from military aircraft at targets on land or sea. There are also unpowered guided glide bombs not considered missiles. The two most common propulsion systems for air-to-surface missiles are rocket motors, usually with shorter range, and slower, longer-range jet engines. Some Soviet-designed air-to-surface missiles are powered by ramjets, giving them both long range and high speed.

Guidance for air-to-surface missiles is typically via laser guidance, infrared guidance, optical guidance or via satellite guidance signals. The type of guidance depends on the type of target. Ships, for example, may be detected via passive radar or active radar homing, which is less effective against multiple, small, fast-moving land targets.

There is some cross-over between air-to-surface missiles and surface-to-surface missiles. For example, there was an air-launched version of the Tomahawk missile, superseded by the AGM-86 ALCM. Other missiles used in both roles include the Penguin and AGM-84 Harpoon anti-ship missiles. Many air-to-surface missiles can be used against both ships and land targets, although some must be modified to perform a different role; for example, the AGM-84E Standoff Land Attack Missile is a land-attack version of the Harpoon.

A major advantage of air-to-surface missiles for ground attack by aircraft is the standoff distance they provide: missiles can be launched from a distance without coming within range of the target's air defences. Most air-to-surface missiles are fire-and-forget from a standoff distance, allowing the attacker to withdraw without approaching further after launch. Some missiles (typically cruise missiles or anti-ship missiles) have long enough range to be launched over the horizon, finding the target autonomously.

Sub-categories of air-to-surface missiles include:

- air-launched anti-tank guided missiles (typically launched from helicopters)
- air-launched cruise missiles
- air-launched anti-ship missiles
- anti-radiation missiles

Typically, the higher and faster the launching aircraft is flying, the longer the reach of a particular missile is. For long-range missiles this difference can be relatively small, but short-range missiles (like the AGM-65 Maverick) have a much longer range when launched at altitude.

There have been examples of air-launched ballistic missiles (Air Launched ICBM, GAM-87 Skybolt), but they are rare. Sometimes air-to-surface missiles are divided into the categories of tactical and strategic. Typically missiles with chemical explosive or small nuclear warheads are classed as tactical, and large nuclear warheads as strategic.

== List of air-to-surface missiles ==
=== Argentina ===
- MP-1000 Martín Pescador
- AS-25K

=== Brazil ===
- MAR-1 anti-radiation missile
- FOG-MPM Fiber Optics Guided Multiple Purpose Missile.
- AVTM-300 Cruise missile.
- MARSUP ASM

=== China ===
- C-101
- C-601
- C-602
- C-611
- C-701
- C-704
- C-705
- C-801
- C-802
- C-805
- Changfeng (missile) (Chang Feng 1)
- Changfeng (missile) (Chang Feng 2)
- DH-10
- FL series (missile)
- FL-8
- FL-9
- FL-10
- FL-7
- HJ-8
- HJ-9
- HJ-10
- HJ-73
- HN-1
- HN-3
- HN-2
- HY series
- KD1 (missile)
- KD2 (missile)
- KD-63
- KD-88
- LMD-002 (missile)
- LMD-003 (missile)
- Sky Arrow (missile)
- Sky Arrow 90
- SY series (missile)
- TBI (missile)
- TL-6
- TL-10
- YJ-12
- YJ-22
- YJ-62
- YJ-63
- YJ-82
- YJ-83
- YJ-91
- ZD1 (missile)

=== France ===
- AS.11
- AS.12
- AS.15TT
- AS.20
- AS.30
- AS.30 TCA
- AS.30 Laser
- AS.37 Martel
- ARMAT
- HOT
- Exocet
- Mistral
- SCALP EG
- TRIGAT LR
- Apache
- ASMP
- ASMP-A
- AASM
- MMP
- ANL

=== Germany ===
- Taurus KEPD 350
- ARMIGER
- PARS 3 LR
- HOT (missile)
- AS.34 Kormoran
- RBS-15 (in cooperation with Sweden)

=== Greece ===
- HSC-1 Makedon

=== India ===
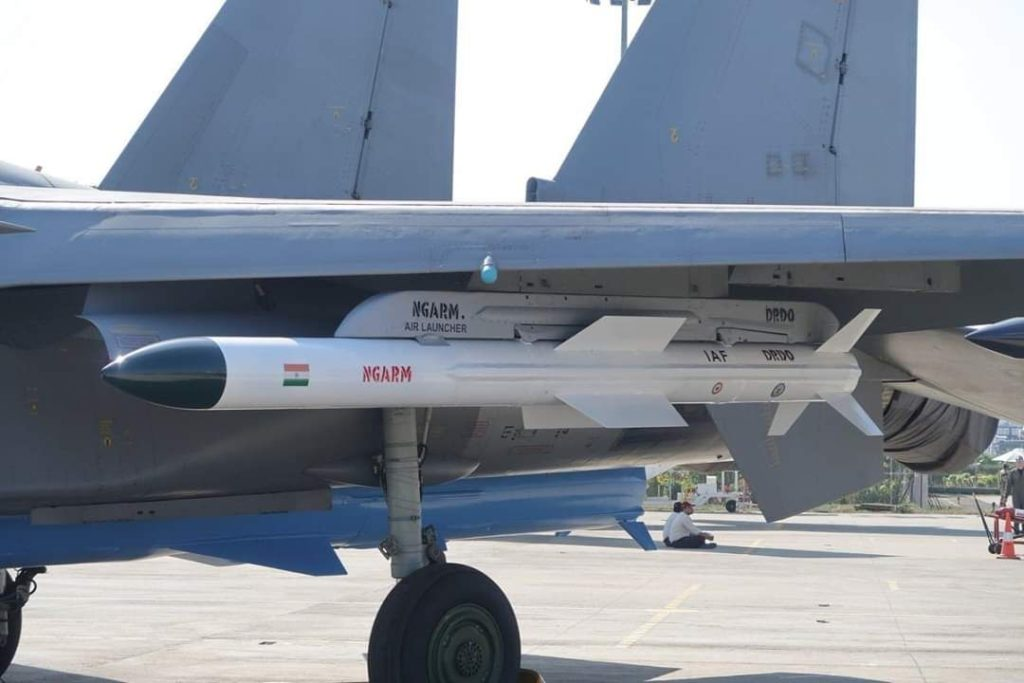
The Indian Air Force's Rudram-1 is an anti-radiation missile

- BrahMos (in service)
- HeliNa/Dhruvastra (user trials)
- SANT (under development)
- Rudram-1 (in service)
- NASM-SR (under development)
- NASM-MR (under development)
- CATS Hunter (under development)
- ULPGM (in service)

=== Israel ===
- Popeye (missile)
- Nimrod (missile)
- Rampage (missile)
- SkySniper
- Delilah (missile)
- Sea Breaker (missile)
- Air lora
- Luz (missile)

=== Iran ===
- Ghased 3
- Zoobin
- Bina
- Sadid-1
- Fajr-4
- Sattar 1
- Sattar 2
- Sattar 3
- Sattar 4
- Ghaem

=== Japan ===
- ASM-1
- ASM-2
- ASM-3
- Type 93 air-to-ship missile

=== Norway ===
- Penguin missile
- Naval Strike Missile

=== Pakistan ===
- Baktar-Shikan Air Launched variant
- Ra'ad (air-launched cruise missile)
- Barq

=== South Africa ===
- Denel ZT3 Ingwe laser guided anti-tank guided missile
- Denel Mokopa air-to-ground missile
- Kentron TORGOS air launched sub-sonic cruise missile (development cancelled)
- Denel Small Guided Missile (in development)

=== South Korea ===
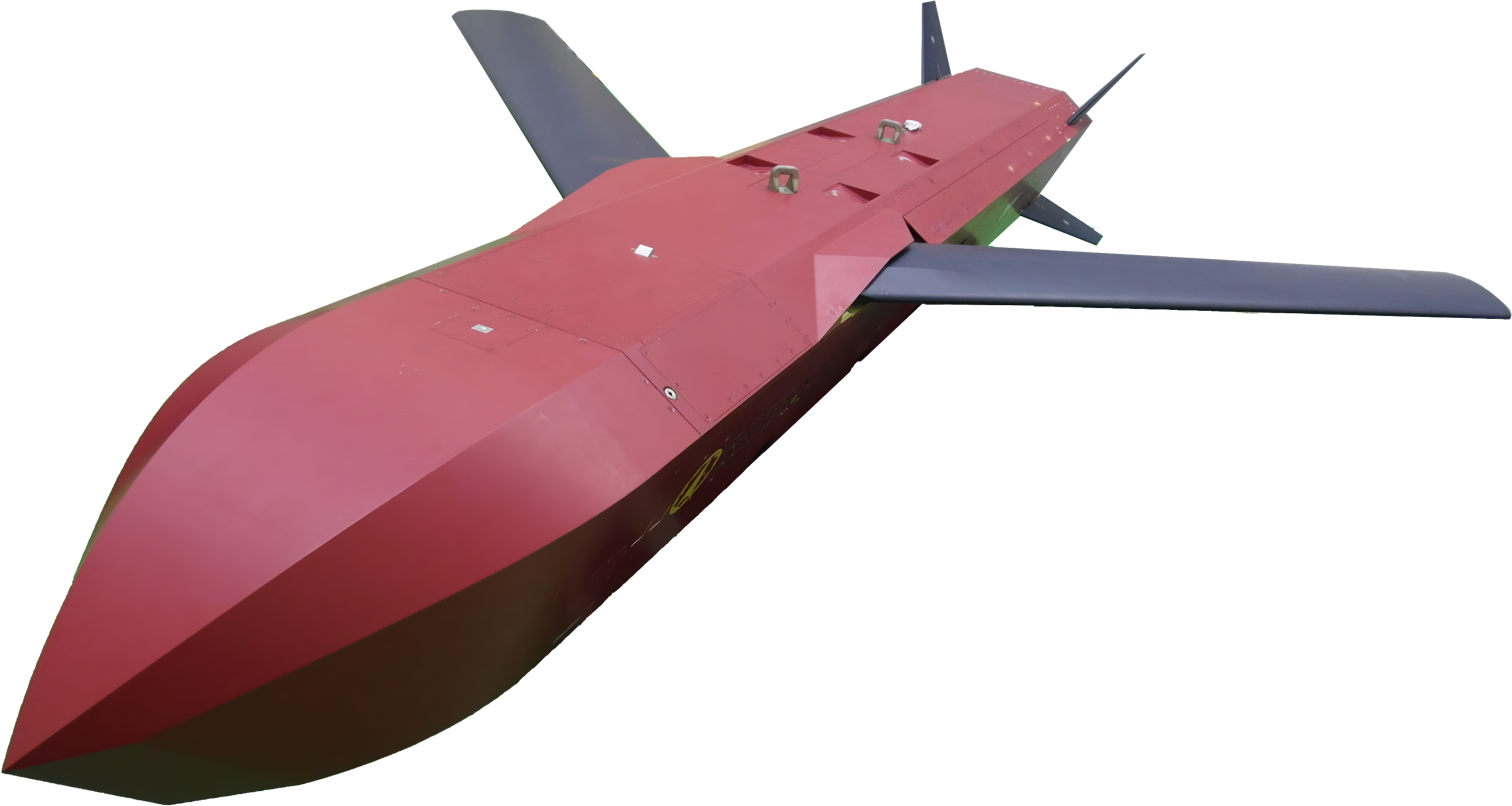
Cheonryong air-launched cruise missile

- KALCM Cheonryong
- TAipers

=== Sweden ===
- Rb 05
- RBS 15

=== Taiwan ===
- Hsiung Feng II (Its air-launched variant has been tested successfully, but it never entered service.)
- Hsiung Feng III
- Sky Sword IIA anti-radiation missile
- Wan Chien

=== Turkey ===
- Cirit
- UMTAS
- MAM (Smart Micro Munition)
  - MAM-C
  - MAM-L
  - MAM-T
- SOM (Air-Launched Cruise Missile)
- Akbaba Anti-radiation missile (Currently in development)
- Kuzgun
  - KUZGUN-TJ: Turbojet-powered variant.
  - KUZGUN-SS: Gliding variant.
  - KUZGUN-KY: Solid fuel rocket-powered variant.
  - BOZOK: Mini version of KUZGUN, specifically designed for UAVs.

=== United Kingdom ===
- Blue Steel missile
- Brimstone missile
- Green Cheese missile (canceled in 1956)
- ALARM
- Storm Shadow
- BAe Sea Eagle
- GAM-87 Skybolt (air-launched ballistic missile; canceled)
- Lightweight Multirole Missile
- SPEAR 3

=== United States ===
- AGM-12 Bullpup (no longer in service)
- AGM-22 (project ceased in 1980s, still in limited use)
- AGM-28 Hound Dog (no longer in service)
- AGM-45 Shrike (no longer in service)
- AGM-53 Condor (project cancelled)
- AGM-63 (project cancelled)
- AGM-64 Hornet (project cancelled)
- AGM-65 Maverick (in service)
- AGM-69 SRAM (no longer in service)
- AGM-76 Falcon (project cancelled)
- AGM-78 Standard ARM (no longer in service)
- AGM-79 Blue Eye (project cancelled)
- AGM-80 Viper (project cancelled)
- AGM-83 Bulldog (project cancelled)
- AGM-84 Harpoon (in service)
- AGM-86 ALCM (in service)
- AGM-87 Focus (no longer in service)
- AGM-88 HARM (in service)
- AGM-112 (reserved when program renamed GBU-15)
- AGM-114 Hellfire (in service)
- AGM-119 Penguin (in service)
- AGM-122 Sidearm (no longer in service)
- AGM-123 Skipper (out of service/no longer in service)
- AGM-124 Wasp (project cancelled)
- AGM-129 ACM (no longer in service)
- AGM-130 (no longer in service)
- AGM-131 SRAM II (project cancelled)
- AGM-136 Tacit Rainbow (project cancelled)
- AGM-137 TSSAM (project cancelled)
- AGM-142 Have Nap (in service)
- AGM-153 (project cancelled)
- AGM-154 JSOW (in service)
- AGM-158 JASSM (in service)
- AGM-159 JASSM (project cancelled)
- AGM-169 Joint Common Missile (project cancelled)
- AGM-176 Griffin (in service)
- Small Advanced Capabilities Missile (SACM) (in development)
- Bold Orion (prototype)
- GAM-87 Skybolt (air-launched ballistic missile; project cancelled)
- High Virgo (prototype)
- Hypersonic Air-breathing Weapon Concept (in development)
- AGM-179 JAGM (in development)
- AGM-183A ARRW (project cancelled)
- LRSO (in development)

=== USSR/Russian Federation ===
- Hermes-A
- Kh-15 (NATO: AS-16 Kickback; Russian: Х-15)
- Kh-20 (NATO: AS-3 Kangaroo)
- Kh-22 (NATO: AS-4 Kitchen; Russian: Х-22)
- Kh-23/Kh-66 Grom (AS-7 Kerry; Russian: Х-23 Гром, "Thunder")
- Kh-25ML (NATO: AS-10 Karen; Russian: Х-25)
- Kh-25MP (NATO: AS-12 Kegler; Russian: Х-25)
- Kh-28 (NATO: AS-9 Kyle; Russian: Х-28)
- Kh-29 (NATO: AS-14 Kedge; Russian: Х-29)
- Kh-31 (NATO: AS-17 Krypton; Russian: Х-31)
- Kh-32 (Russian: Х-32)
- Kh-35 (NATO: AS-20 Kayak; Russian: Х-35)
- Kh-38 (Russian: Х-38)
- Kh-45
- Kh-47M2 Kinzhal (AS-24 Killjoy; Russian: Х-47M2 Кинжал, "Dagger")
- Kh-55 (NATO: AS-15 Kent; Russian: Х-55)
- Kh-58 (NATO: AS-11 Kilter; Russian: Х-58)
- Kh-59 Ovod (NATO: AS-13 Kingbolt; Russian: Х-59 Овод, "Gadfly")
- Kh-59M Ovod-M (NATO: AS-18 Kazoo)
- Kh-80 (NATO: AS-19 Koala)
- Kh-90 (NATO: AS-X-19 Koala)
- KS-1 Komet (NATO: AS-1 Kennel)
- KSR-2 (NATO: AS-5 Kelt)
- KSR-5 (NATO: AS-6 Kingfish)
- K-10S (AS-2 Kipper)
- R-82
- S-5
- S-8
- S-13
- S-24
- S-25
- 9K114 Shturm (NATO: AT-6 Spiral)

=== Yemen (Houthi) ===
- AKHGAR

== See also ==
- Surface-to-air missile
- Laser-guided bomb
- Anti-tank guided missile
- Anti-ship missile
- Cruise missile
- Anti-radiation missile
- Anti-surface warfare
- Air-to-ground weaponry
