= Ghased =

Ghased (Persian: قاصد, romanized: qâsed, lit. 'messenger') may refer to:

- Ghased (bomb) – an Iranian smartbomb
- Ghased (rocket) – an Iranian satellite launch vehicle
- Ghassed – a series of Iranian guided bombs

== See also ==
- Qasid (disambiguation)
- Qased (disambiguation)
- قاصد (disambiguation)
