= Qased (disambiguation) =

Qased may refer to:

- Qased Othman (musician), a member of Jordanian rock band JadaL (Arabic: جدل, lit. 'Controversy')
- Qased (bomb) (Persian: قاصد, lit. 'Messenger'), an Iranian smartbomb, precision-guided munition
- Qased (rocket) (Persian: قاصد, lit. 'messenger'), an Iranian launch vehicle, small satellite orbital space rocket

== See also ==
- Courier (Indian English: cossid; Hindi: क़ासिद, IPA: /kɑː.sɪd̪/; Urdu: قاصد, IPA: /qɑː.sɪd̪/)
- Qassed (bomb), an Iranian guided bomb, precision smart munition
- Qasid (disambiguation); including (Arabic: قاصد, lit. 'courier';)
- Ghased (disambiguation); including (Persian: قاصد, lit. 'messenger';)
- قاصد (disambiguation)
