= AGM-65 Maverick =

American air-to-surface missile

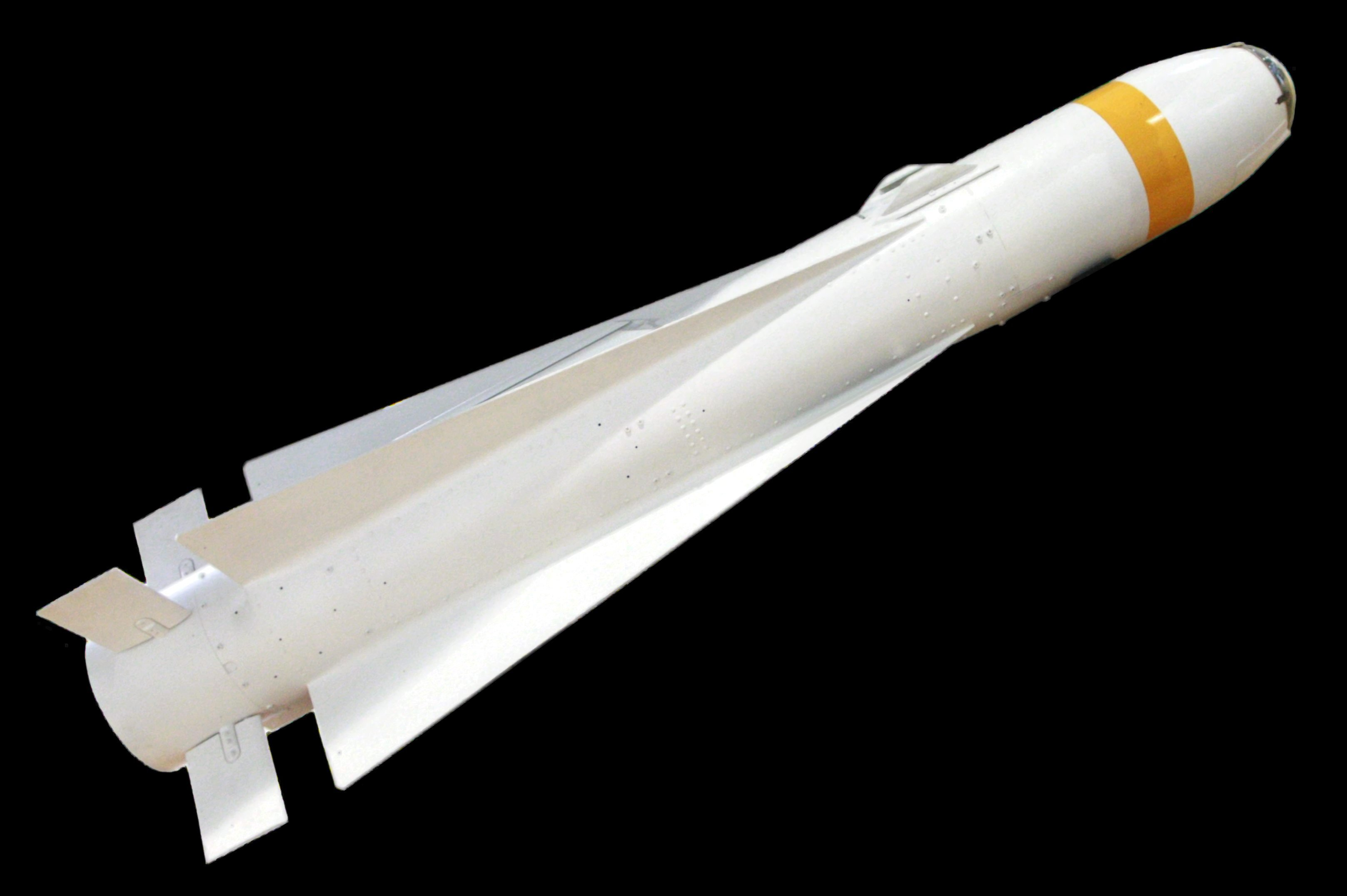
- Type: Air-to-surface missile
- Place of origin: United States

Service history
- In service: 30 August 1972 – present
- Used by: >30 countries
- Wars: Cold War; Vietnam War; Yom Kippur War; Iran–Iraq War; Persian Gulf War; Kosovo War; Iraq War; First Libyan Civil War

Production history
- Manufacturer: Raytheon Missile Systems; Raytheon
- Unit cost: US$17,000 to $110,000, depending on variant
- No. built: >70,000

Specifications
- Mass: 463–670 lb (210–304 kg)
- Length: 249 cm (8 ft 2 in)
- Diameter: 12 in (30 cm)
- Wingspan: 2.33 ft (710 mm)
- Warhead: 126 lb (57 kg) WDU-20/B shaped-charge (A/B/C/D/H models); 300 lb (140 kg) WDU-24/B penetrating blast-fragmentation (E/F/G/J/K models); E models utilize FMU-135/B delayed impact fuze
- Engine: A/B: Thiokol SR109-TC-1; D/E/F/G/H/J/K: SR114-TC-1 (or Aerojet SR115-AJ-1) solid propellant rocket motor via a WPU-4/B or WPU-8/B propulsion section
- Propellant: Solid propellant
- Operational range: Greater than 22 km (12 nmi)
- Maximum speed: 1,150 km/h (620 kn)
- Guidance system: A/B/H/J/K: Contrast seeker; D/F/G: imaging infrared guidance; E/E2/L: Laser guidance

The AGM-65 Maverick is an air-to-ground missile (AGM) designed for close air support. It is the most widely produced precision-guided missile in the Western world, and is effective against a wide range of tactical targets, including armor, air defenses, ships, ground transportation and fuel storage facilities.

Development began in 1966 at Hughes Aircraft Company as the first missile to use an electronic contrast seeker. It entered service with the United States Air Force in August 1972. Since then, it has been exported to more than 30 countries and is certified on 25 aircraft. The Maverick served during the Vietnam, Yom Kippur, Iran–Iraq, and Persian Gulf Wars, along with other smaller conflicts, destroying enemy forces and installations with varying degrees of success.

Since its introduction into service, numerous Maverick versions had been designed and produced using electro-optical, laser, and imaging infrared guidance systems. The AGM-65 has two types of warhead: one has a contact fuze in the nose, the other has a heavyweight warhead fitted with a delayed-action fuze, which penetrates the target with its kinetic energy before detonating. The missile is currently produced by Raytheon Missiles & Defense.

The Maverick shares the same configuration as Hughes' AIM-4 Falcon and AIM-54 Phoenix, and measures more than 7.9 ft (2.4 m) in length and 12 in (30 cm) in diameter.

== Development ==
The Maverick's development history began in 1965, when the United States Air Force (USAF) began a program to develop a replacement to the AGM-12 Bullpup. With a range of 8.8 nmi (16.3 km), the radio-guided Bullpup was introduced in 1959 and was considered a "silver bullet" by operators. However, the launch aircraft was required to fly straight towards the target during the missile's flight instead of performing evasive maneuvers, thus endangering itself. Even when it hit, the small 250 lb (110 kg) warhead was only useful against small targets like bunkers; when used against larger targets like the Thanh Hóa Bridge it did little more than char the structure. The USAF began a series of projects to replace Bullpup, both larger versions of Bullpup, models C and D, as well as a series of Bullpup adaptations offering fire-and-forget guidance. Among the latter were the AGM-83 Bulldog, AGM-79 Blue Eye and AGM-80 Viper.

From 1966 to 1968, Hughes Missile Systems Division and Rockwell competed for the contract to build an entirely new fire-and-forget missile with far greater range performance than any of the Bullpup versions. Each were allocated $3 million for preliminary design and engineering work of the Maverick in 1966. In 1968, Hughes emerged with the $95 million contract for further development and testing of the missile; at the same time, contract options called for 17,000 missiles to be procured. Hughes conducted a smooth development of the AGM-65 Maverick, with the first unguided test launch from an F-4 on 18 September 1969, with the first guided test on 18 December successfully performing a direct hit on a M41 tank target at the Air Force Missile Development Center at Holloman Air Force Base, New Mexico.

In July 1971, the USAF and Hughes signed a $69.9 million contract for 2,000 missiles, the first of which was delivered in 1972. Although early operational results were favorable, military planners predicted that the Maverick would fare less successfully in the hazy conditions of Central Europe, where it would have been used against Warsaw Pact forces. As such, development of the AGM-65B "Scene Magnified" version began in 1975 before it was delivered during the late 1970s. When production of the AGM-65A/B was ended in 1978, more than 35,000 missiles had been built.

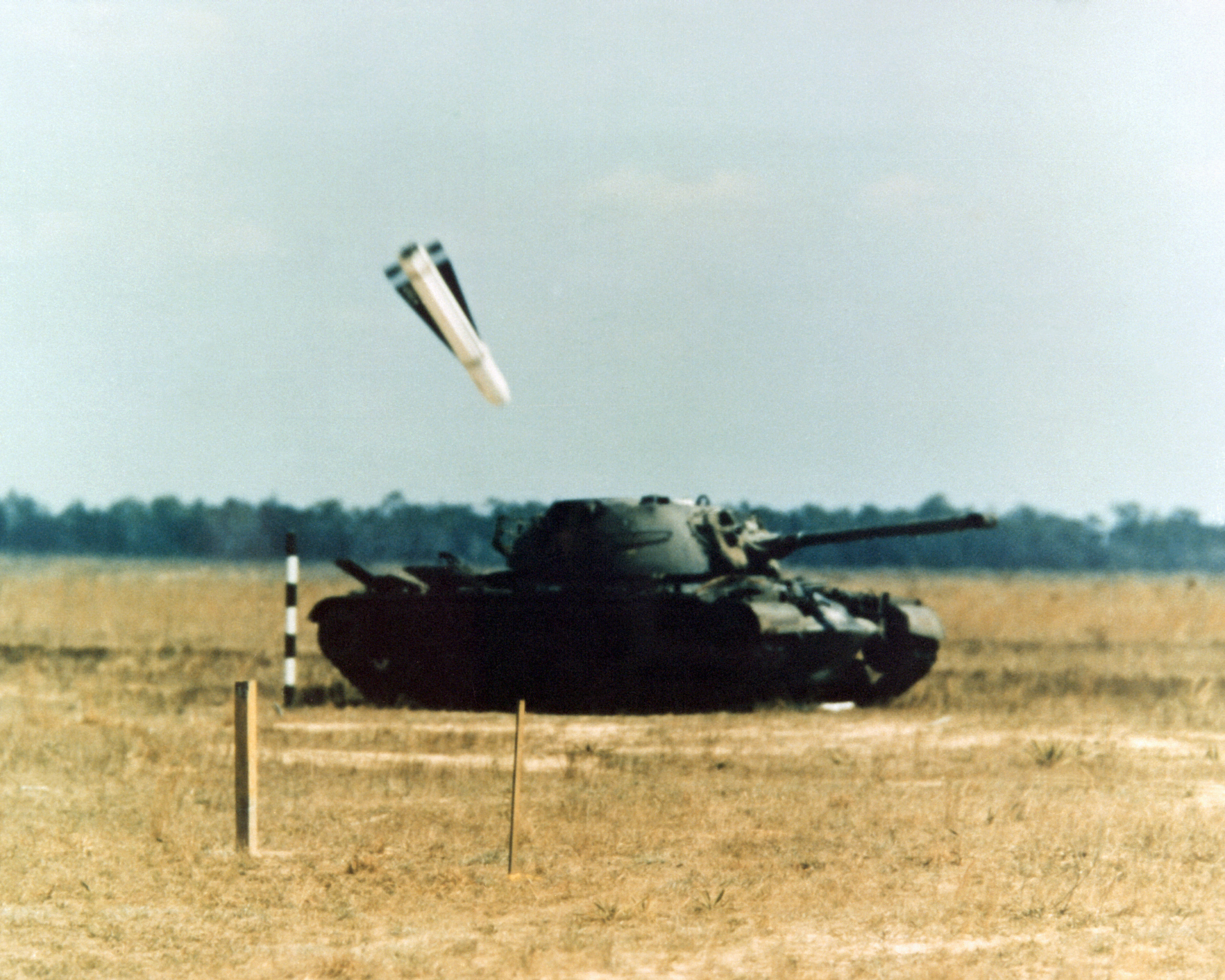
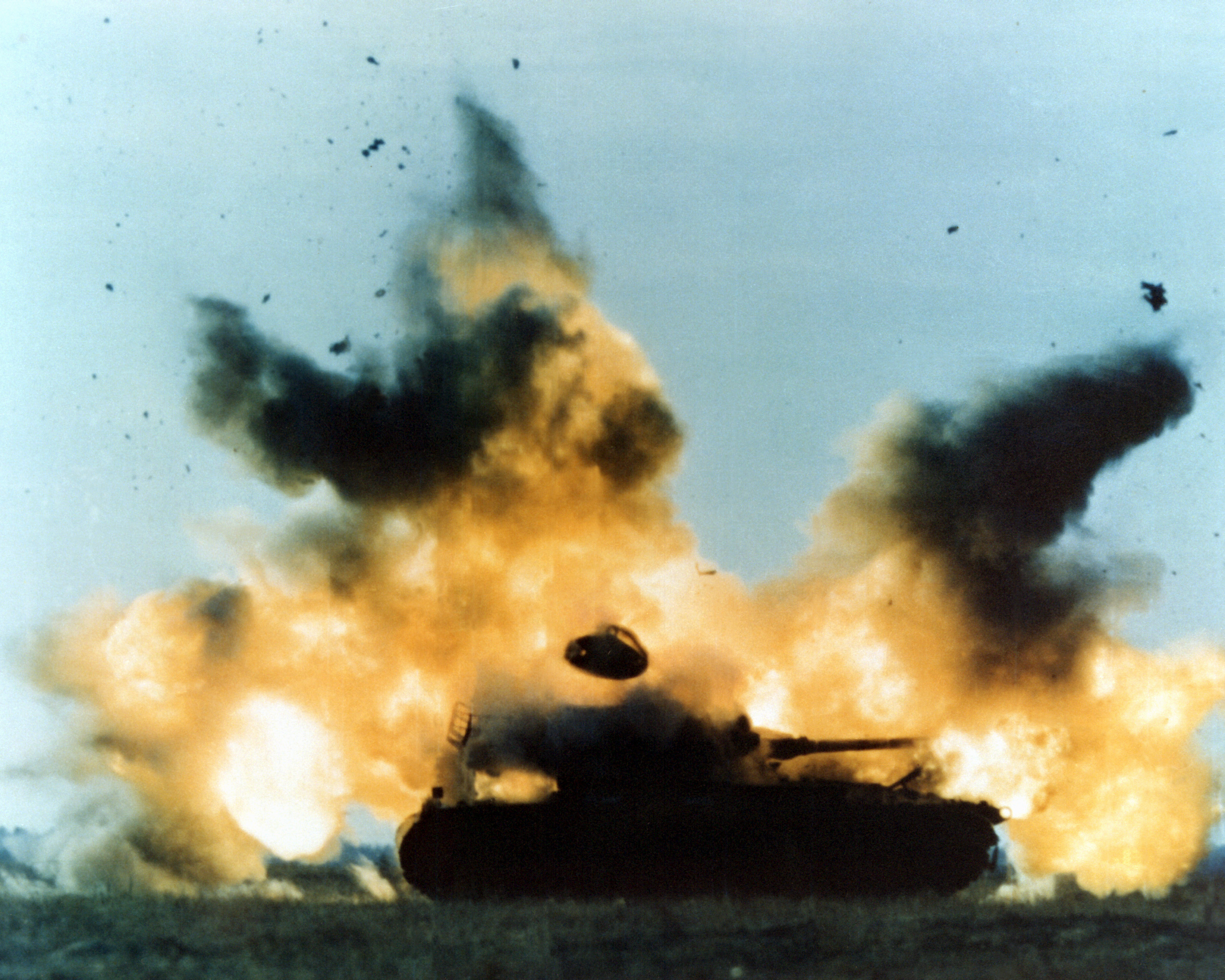
An AGM-65 test-fired against an M48 tank (1978)

More versions of the Maverick appeared, among which was the laser-guided AGM-65C/E. Development of the AGM-65C started in 1978 by Rockwell, who built a number of development missiles for the USAF. Due to high cost, the version was not procured by the USAF, and instead entered service with the United States Marine Corps (USMC) as the AGM-65E.

Another major development was the AGM-65D, which employed an imaging infrared (IIR) seeker. By imaging on radiated heat, the IIR is all-weather operable as well as showing improved performance in acquiring and tracking the hot engines, such as in tanks and trucks, that were to be one of its major missions. The seekerhead mechanically scanned the scene over a nitrogen-cooled 4-by-4 pixel array using a series of mirrored facets machined into the inner surface of the ring-shaped main gyroscope. The five-year development period of the AGM-65D started in 1977 and ended with the first delivery to the USAF in October 1983. The version received initial operating capability in February 1986.

The AGM-65F is a hybrid Maverick combining the AGM-65D's IIR seeker with the warhead and propulsion components of the AGM-65E. Deployed by the United States Navy (USN), the AGM-65F is optimized for maritime strike roles. The first AGM-65F launch from the P-3C took place in 1989, and in 1994, the USN awarded Unisys a contract to integrate the version with the P-3C. Meanwhile, Hughes produced the AGM-65G, which essentially has the same guidance system as the D, with some software modifications that track larger targets.

In the mid-1990s to early 2000s, there were several ideas for enhancing the Maverick's potential. Among them was the stillborn plan to incorporate the Maverick millimeter wave active radar homing, which can determine the exact shape of a target. Another study called "Longhorn Project" was conducted by Hughes, and later Raytheon following the absorption of Hughes into Raytheon, looked into a Maverick version equipped with turbojet engines instead of rocket motors. The "Maverick ER", as it was dubbed, would have a "significant increase in range" compared to the Maverick's current range of 25 kilometres (16 mi). The proposal was abandoned, but if the Maverick ER had entered production, it would have replaced the AGM-119B Penguin carried on the MH-60R.

The most modern versions of the Maverick are the AGM-65H/K, which were in production as of 2007. The AGM-65H was developed by coupling the AGM-65B with a charge-coupled device (CCD) seeker optimized for desert operations and which has three times the range of the original TV-sensor; a parallel USN program aimed at rebuilding AGM-65Fs with newer CCD seekers resulted in the AGM-65J. The AGM-65K, meanwhile, was developed by replacing the AGM-65G's IR guidance system with an electro-optical television guidance system.

== Design ==
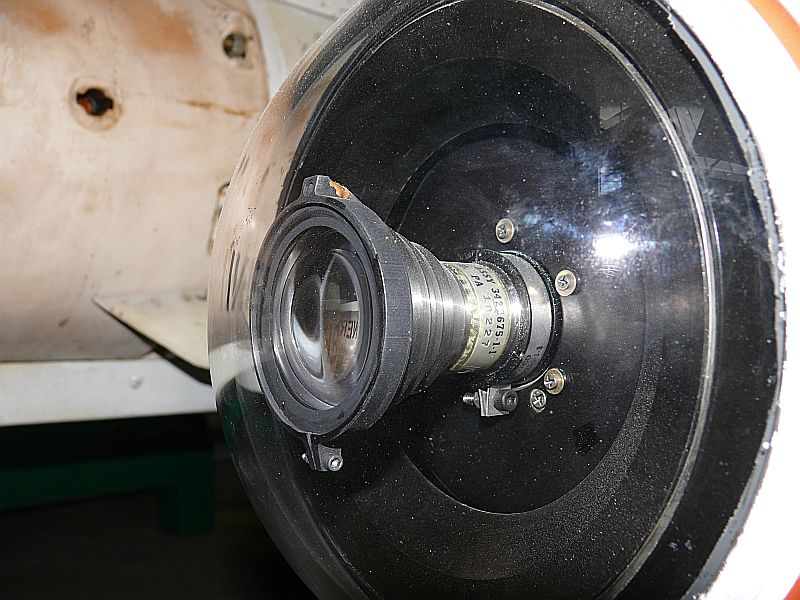
AGM-65B Optical seeker

The Maverick has a modular design, allowing for different combinations of the guidance package and warhead to be attached to the rocket motor to produce a different weapon. It has long-chord delta wings and a cylindrical body, reminiscent of the AIM-4 Falcon and the AIM-54 Phoenix.

Different models of the AGM-65 have used electro-optical, laser, and imaging infrared guidance systems. The AGM-65 has two types of warhead: one has a contact fuze in the nose, the other has a heavyweight warhead fitted with a delayed-action fuze, which penetrates the target with its kinetic energy before detonating. The latter is most effective against large, hard targets. The propulsion system for both types is a solid-fuel rocket motor behind the warhead.

The Maverick missile is unable to lock onto targets on its own; it has to be given input by the pilot or weapon systems officer after which it follows the path to the target autonomously. In most modern aircraft with MFDs, an A-10 Thunderbolt II for example, the video feed from the seeker head is relayed to a screen in the cockpit, where the pilot can check the locked target of the missile before launch. A crosshair on the heads-up display is shifted by the pilot to set the approximate target, where the missile will then automatically recognize and lock on to the target. Once the missile is launched, it requires no further assistance from the launch vehicle and tracks its target automatically. This fire-and-forget property is not shared by the E version that uses semi-active laser homing.

While the Maverick missile's seeker can be used as a way to locate and lock targets, external targeting pods are used more often. The seeker head follows the movements of the targeting pod and attempts to point at the same point on the ground. G-forces throughout flight, however, often cause misalignment in the seeker head, requiring pilots to boresight the missile seeker to the targeting pod prior to locking up a target. To boresight, a certain reference point on the ground is locked by the targeting pod, known as the Sensor Point of Interest (SPI). The Maverick missile's seeker head is then adjusted to correct small offsets, so that it points at the same SPI as the targeting pod. This allows for simpler target acquisition and deployment.

== Variants ==
Differences between different Maverick versions
	AGM-65A/B	AGM-65D	AGM-65E/E2/L	AGM-65F/G	AGM-65H	AGM-65J	AGM-65K
Length	2.49 m (8 ft 2 in)						
Wingspan	72 cm (28.3 in)						
Diameter	30 cm (12 in)						
Weight	210 kg (462 lb)	220 kg (485 lb)	293 kg (645 lb)	306 kg (675 lb)	210 or 211 kg (462 or 465 lb)	297 kg (654 lb)	306 kg (675 lb)
Speed	1,150 km/h (620 kn)						
Range	Greater than 22 km (12 nmi)						
Guidance	Electro-optical	Imaging infrared	Laser	Imaging infrared	Charge-coupled device		
Propulsion	Thiokol SR109-TC-1 solid-fuel rocket	Thiokol SR114-TC-1 (or Aerojet SR115-AJ-1) solid-fuel rocket					
Warhead	57 kg (126 lb) WDU-20/B shaped-charge		136 kg (300 lb) WDU-24/B penetrating blast-fragmentation		57 kg (126 lb) WDU-20/B shaped-charge	136 kg (300 lb) WDU-24/B penetrating blast-fragmentation	

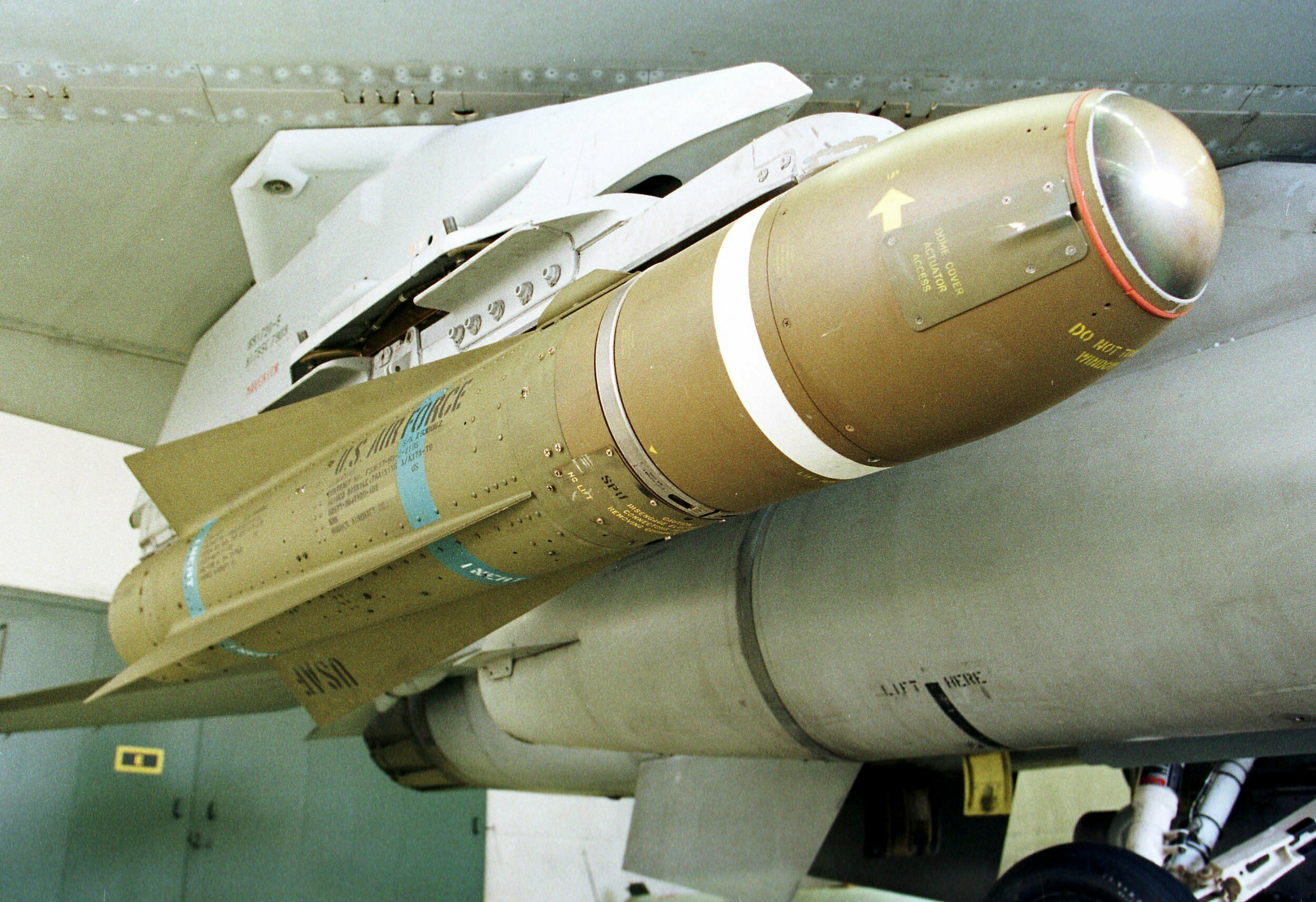
AGM-65D

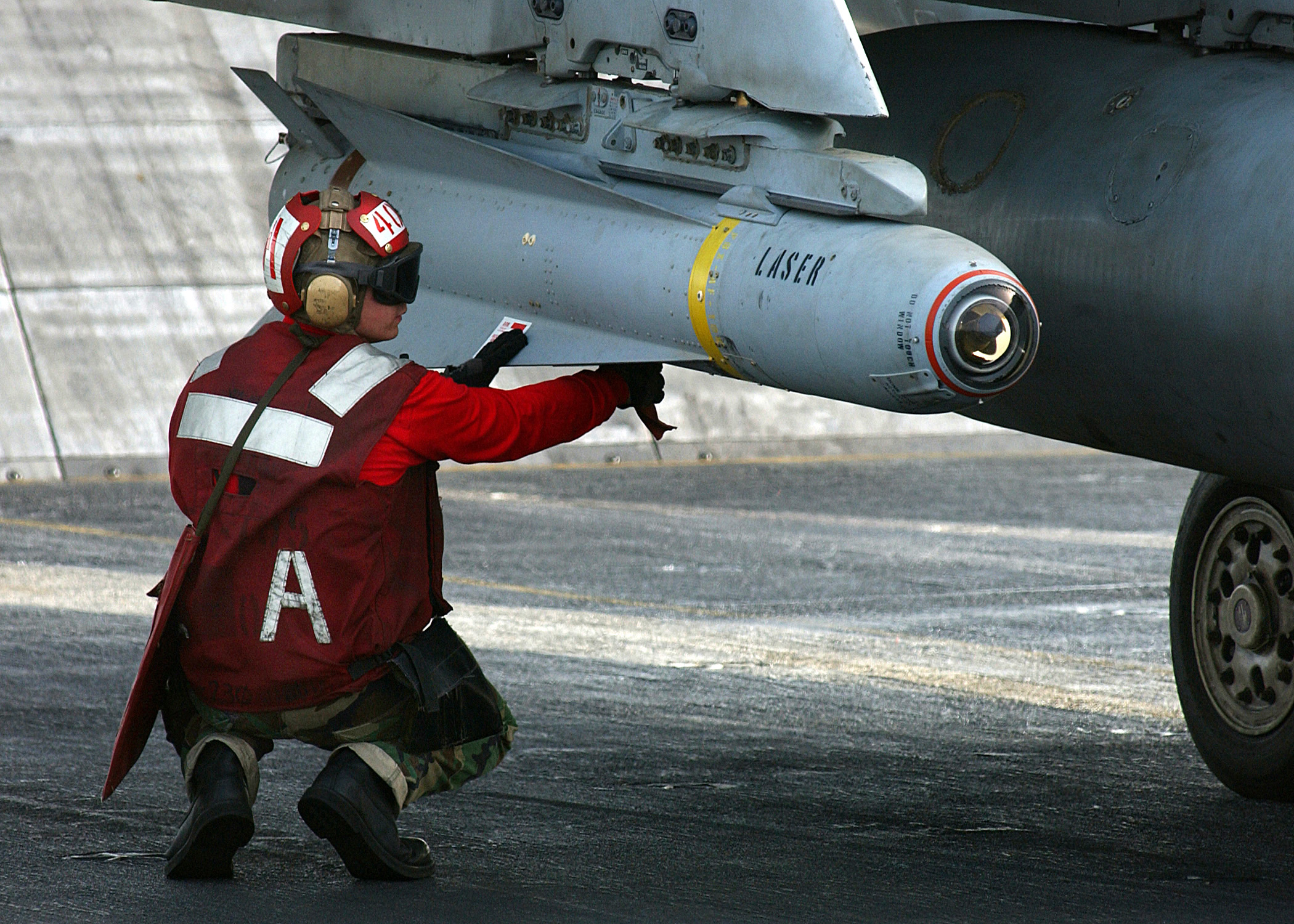
Laser AGM-65E Maverick on a USN F/A-18C, 2004.

- Maverick A is the basic model and uses an electro-optical television guidance system. No longer in U.S. service.
- Maverick B is similar to the A model, although the B model added optical zooming to lock onto small or distant targets.
- Maverick C was to be a laser-guided variant for the United States Marine Corps (USMC). It was canceled before production, however its requirement was later met by the Maverick E.
- Maverick D replaced the electro-optical guidance with an imaging infrared system which doubled the practical firing distance and allowed for its use at night and during bad weather. A reduced smoke rocket engine was also introduced in this model. It achieved its initial operation capability in 1986.
- Maverick E uses a laser designator guidance system optimized for fortified installations using a delayed fuse combined with a heavier penetrating blast-fragmentation warhead (140 kg (300 lb) vs. 57 kg (125 lb) in older models) that perforates a target with its kinetic energy before detonation. It achieved initial operating capability in 1985 and was used mainly by USMC aviation.
- Maverick F, designed specially for United States Navy, it uses a modified Maverick D infrared guidance system optimized for tracking ships fitted onto a Maverick-E body and warhead.
- Maverick G model essentially has the same guidance system as the D with some software modification that enables the pilot to track larger targets. The G model's major difference is its heavier penetrator warhead taken from the Maverick E, compared to the D model's shaped-charge warhead. It completed tests in 1988.
- Maverick H model is an AGM-65B/D missile upgraded with a new charge-coupled device (CCD) seeker better suited for the desert environment.
- Maverick J model is a Navy AGM-65F missile upgraded with the new CCD seeker. However, this conversion is not confirmed.
- Maverick K model is an AGM-65G upgraded with the CCD seeker; at least 1,200, but possibly up to 2,500 AGM-65G rounds are planned for conversion to AGM-65K standard.
- Maverick E2/L model incorporates a laser-guided seeker that allows for designation by the launch aircraft, another aircraft, or a ground source and can engage small, fast moving, and maneuvering targets on land and at sea.

== Deployment ==
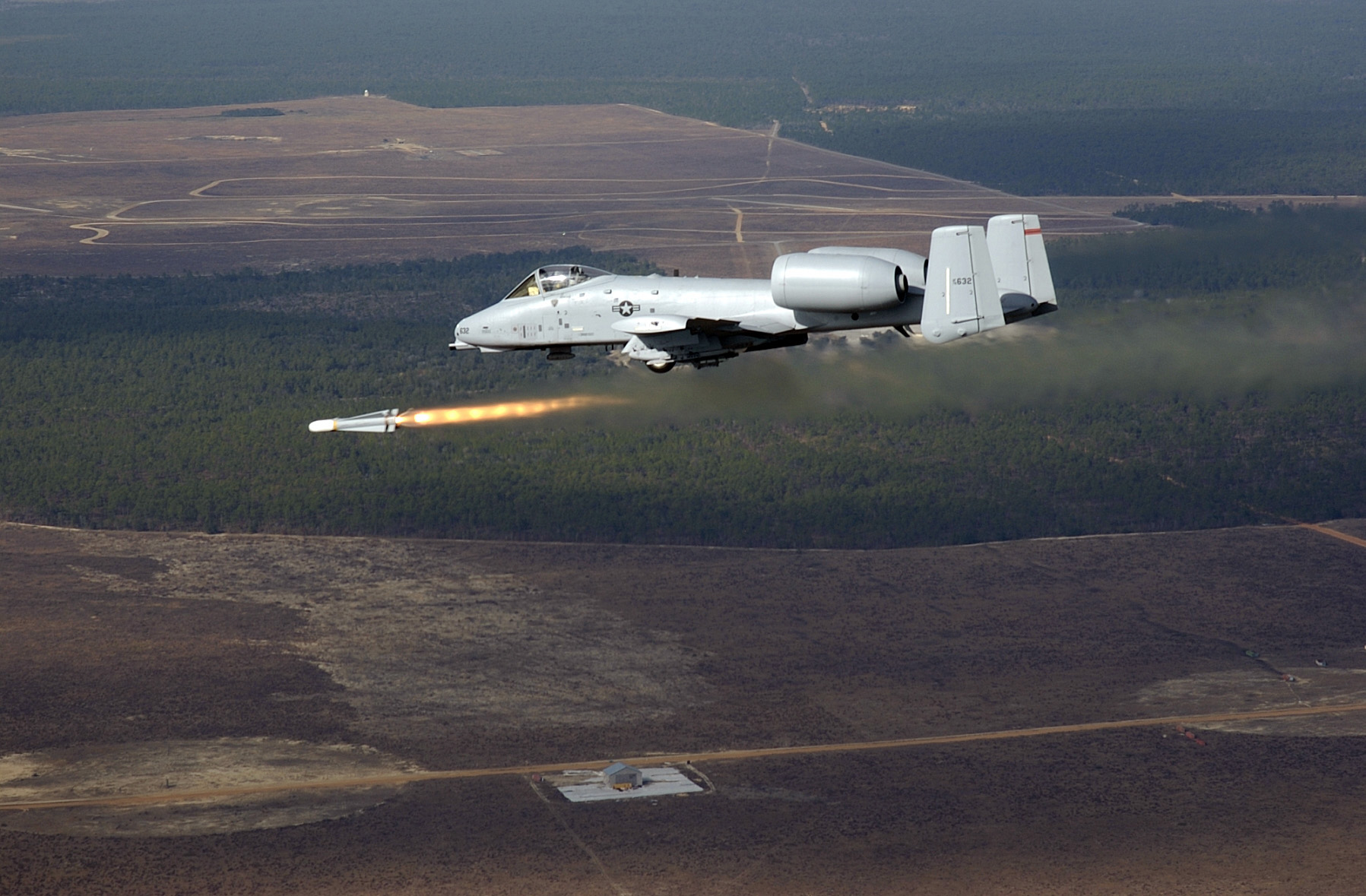
An A-10 firing a Maverick missile

The Maverick was declared operational on 30 August 1972 with the F-4D/Es and A-7s initially cleared for the type; the missile made its combat debut four months later with the USAF in Operation Linebacker II, the last major USAF operation of the Vietnam War. During the Yom Kippur War in October 1973, the Israelis used Mavericks to destroy and disable enemy vehicles. Deployment of early versions of the Mavericks in these two wars were successful due to the favorable atmospheric conditions that suited the electro-optical TV seeker. Ninety-nine missiles were fired during the two wars, eighty-four of which were successful. (Note: Laur and Llanso claim that 18 Mavericks were launched for 13 hits during the Vietnam War from January to February 1973, while the Israelis launched 50 Mavericks during the Yom Kippur War for 42 hits and five deliberate misses.).

The Maverick was used for trials with the BGM-34A unmanned aerial vehicle in 1972–1973. Targeting could be carried out with a TV camera in the nose of the UAV or using the seeker of an AGM-45 Shrike anti-radar missile also carried by the UAV to locate the target for the Maverick's camera to lock on to.

In June 1975, during a border confrontation, a formation of Iranian F-4E Phantoms destroyed a group of Iraqi tanks by firing 12 Mavericks at them. Five years later, during Operation Morvarid as part of the Iran–Iraq War, Iranian F-4s used Mavericks to sink three Osa II missile boats and four P-6 combat ships. Due to weapons embargoes, Iran had to equip its AH-1J SeaCobra helicopters with AGM-65 Maverick missiles and used them with some success in various operations such as Operation Fath ol-Mobin wherein Iranian AH-1Js fired 11 Mavericks.

In August 1990, Iraq invaded Kuwait. In early 1991, the US-led Coalition executed Operation Desert Storm during which Mavericks played a crucial role in the ousting of Iraqi forces from Kuwait. Employed by F-15E Strike Eagles, F/A-18 Hornets, AV-8B Harriers, F-16 Fighting Falcons and A-10 Thunderbolt IIs, but used mainly by the last two, more than 5,000 Mavericks were used to attack armored targets. The most-used variant by the USAF was the IIR-guided AGM-65D. The reported hit rate by USAF Mavericks was 80–90%, while for the USMC it was 60%. In October 1991, during the early days of the Yugoslav Wars, a Yugoslav MiG-29 fired a Maverick at the Banski dvori, the seat of the Croatian government in Zagreb. The Maverick was used again in Iraq during the 2003 Iraq War, during which 918 were fired.

The first time the Maverick was fired from a Lockheed P-3 Orion at a hostile vessel was when the USN and coalition units came to the aid of Libyan rebels to engage the Libyan Coast Guard vessel Vittoria in the port of Misrata, Libya, during the late evening of 28 March 2011. Vittoria was engaged and fired upon by a USN P-3C Maritime Patrol aircraft with AGM-65 Maverick missiles.

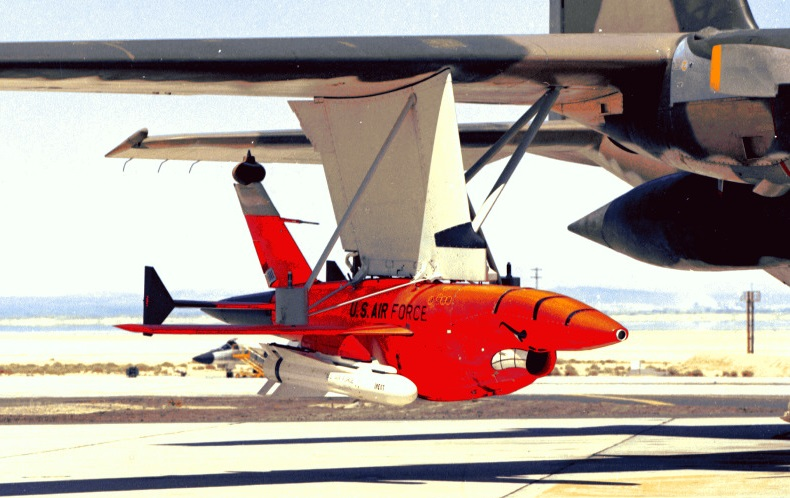
Firebee drone carrying two AGM-65 Mavericks for strike mission.

== Launch platforms ==
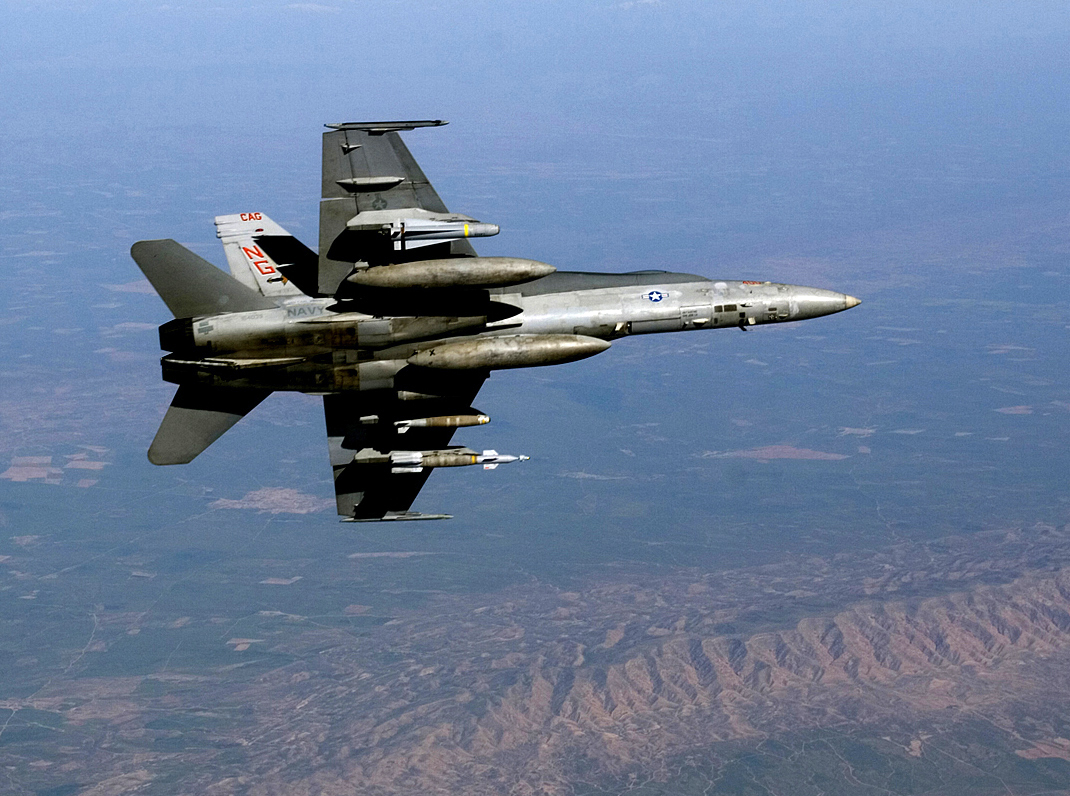
A U.S. Navy F/A-18C Hornet armed with AGM-65 Maverick.

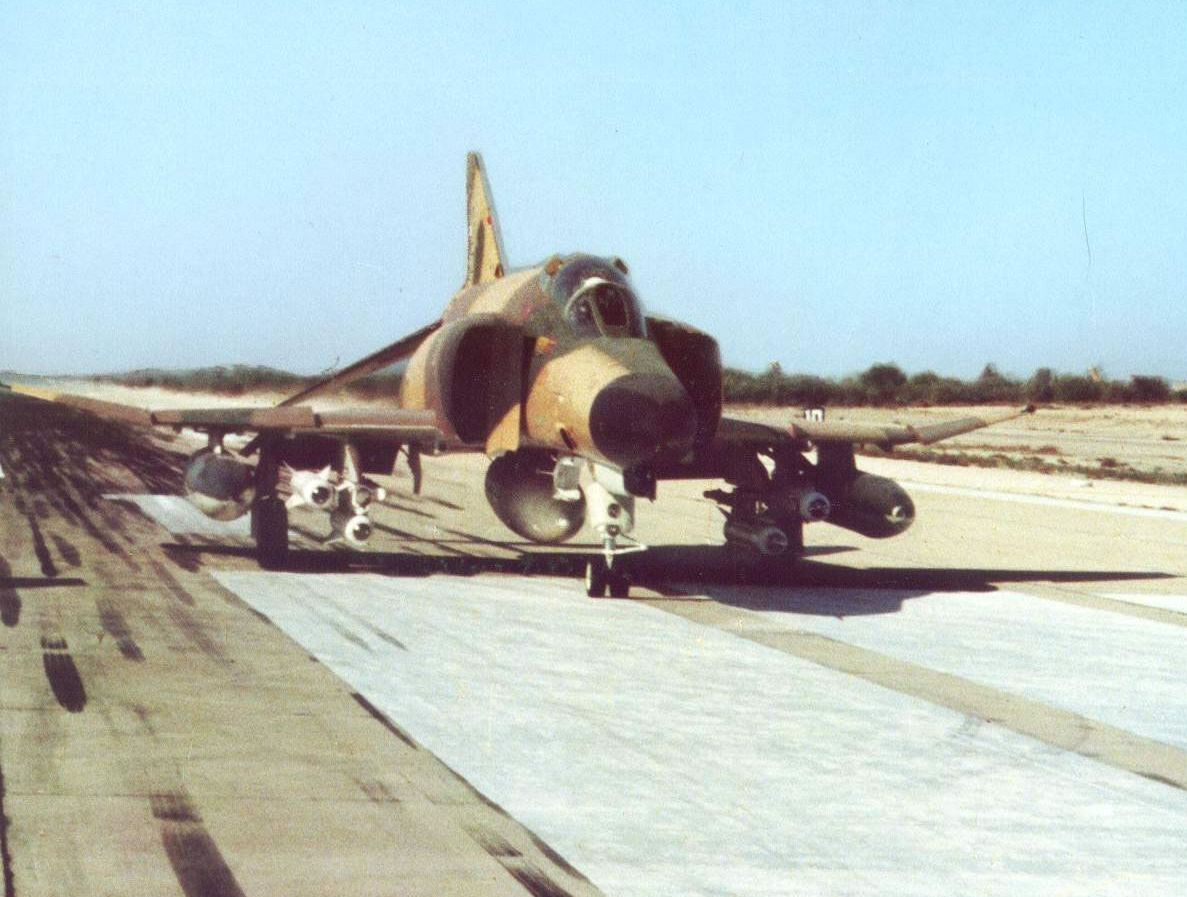
An Imperial Iranian Air Force F-4E Phantom II carrying four AGM-65 Mavericks.

=== United States ===
LAU-117 Maverick launchers have been used on US Army, USN, USAF, and USMC aircraft (some platforms may load LAU-88 triple-rail launchers when configured and authorized):

- Bell AH-1W SuperCobra
- Boeing AH-64D/E Apache
- Boeing F/A-18E/F Super Hornet
- McDonnell Douglas A-4M Skyhawk II
- Grumman A-6E SWIP Intruder
- Fairchild Republic A-10C Thunderbolt II
- General Dynamics F-111F Aardvark
- General Dynamics F-16C Fighting Falcon
- Kaman SH-2G Super Seasprite
- Lockheed P-3C Orion
- LTV A-7E Corsair II
- McDonnell Douglas AV-8B+ Harrier II
- McDonnell Douglas F-4G Phantom II
- McDonnell Douglas F-15E Strike Eagle
- McDonnell Douglas F/A-18C+ Hornet

=== Export ===
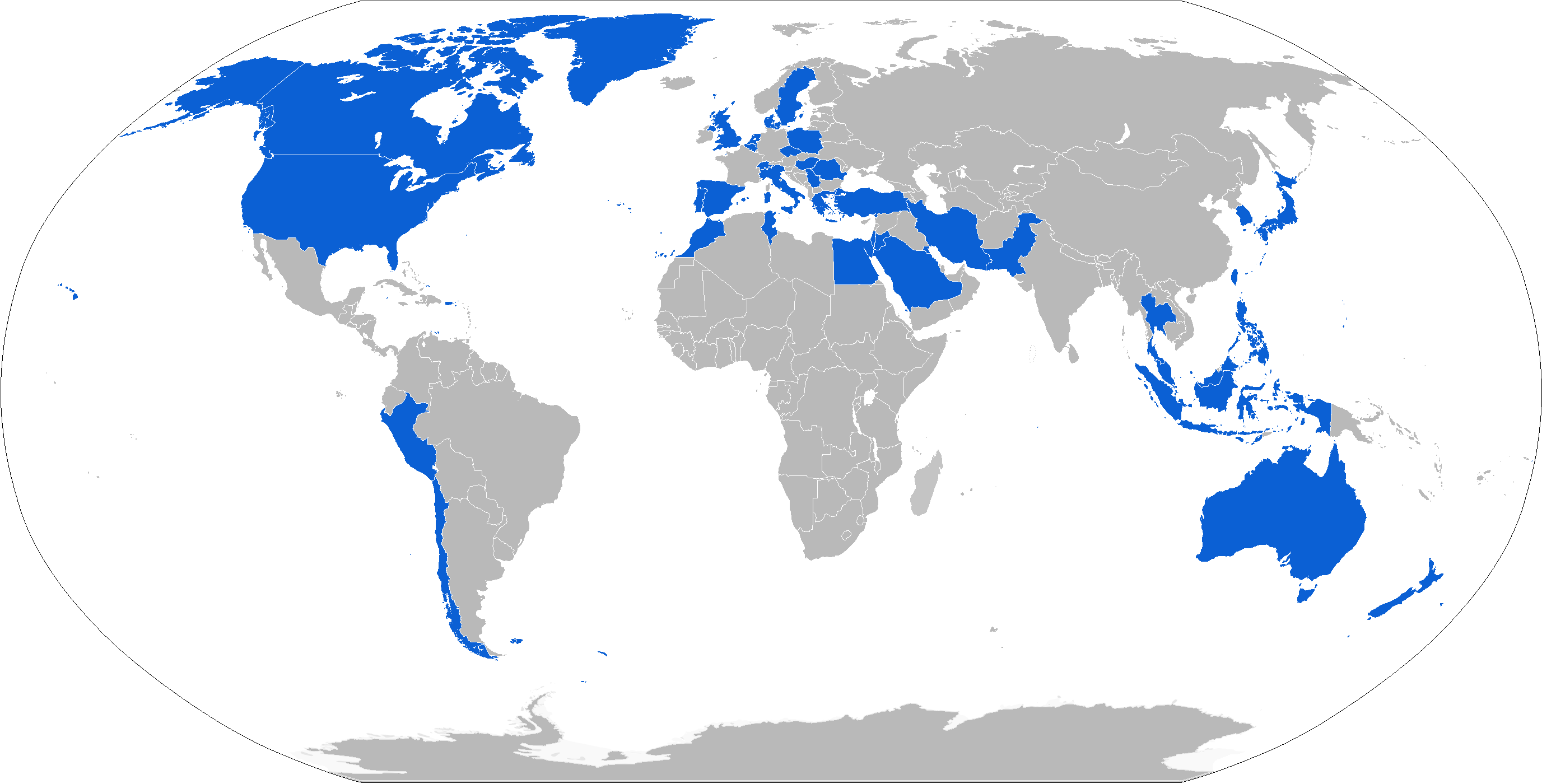
Map with AGM-65 operators in blue.

The Maverick has been exported to at least 35 countries:

- (Australia) Royal Australian Air Force: F/A-18
- (Belgium) Belgian Air Component: F-16
- (Canada) Royal Canadian Air Force: CF-18
- (Chile) Chilean Air Force: F-16 AM/BM MLU, F-16 C/D Block 50+
- (Czech Republic) Czech Air Force: L-159
- (Denmark) Royal Danish Air Force: F-16 (AGM-65G)
- (Egypt) Egyptian Air Force: F-4 and F-16 (AGM-65A/B/E)
- (Greece) Hellenic Air Force: F-4 and F-16 Blocks 30, 50, and 52+
- (Hungary) Hungarian Air Force: JAS 39
- (Indonesia) Indonesian Air Force: F-16AM/BM Block 20 eMLU, F-16C/D Block 52ID, Hawk 209, T-50I (AGM-65B/D/G/K)
- (Iraq) Iraqi Air Force: F-16C/D Block 52 (AGM-65D/G/H/K)
- Islamic Republic of Iran Air Force: F-4E and SH-3D; Islamic Republic of Iran Army Aviation: AH-1J
- (Israel) Israeli Air Force: F-4E and F-16
- (Italy) Italian Navy: AV-8B
- (Japan) JSDF: P-1 F-2
- (Jordan) Royal Jordanian Air Force: F-16 MLU and F-5E/F
- Kuwait Air Force
- (Malaysia) Royal Malaysian Air Force: F/A-18D, and Hawk 208
- (Morocco) Royal Moroccan Air Force: F-5E/F (AGM-65B), F-16 Block 52+ (AGM-65D/G/H)
- Royal Netherlands Air Force: F-16 (AGM-65D, AGM-65G)
- Royal Air Force of Oman: F-16
- Pakistan Air Force: F-16
- (Peru) Peruvian Navy: SH-2G
- (Philippines) Philippine Air Force: FA-50PH (AGM-65G2)
- (Poland) Polish Air Force: F-16 Block 50/52+
- (Portugal) Portuguese Air Force: F-16, A-7P. Capable of being launched by the Portuguese P-3C Cup+.
- (Romania) Romanian Air Force: F-16A/B Block 15 MLU
- (Saudi Arabia) Royal Saudi Air Force: F-5E F-15S
- (Serbia) Serbian Air Force and Air Defence: J-22 and G-4
- Republic of Singapore Air Force: A-4SU, F-5S, F-16C/D Block 52, F-15SG and Hunter
- (South Korea) Republic of Korea Air Force: FA-50, TA-50, F-16, F-15K, F-4
- (Spain) Spanish Air Force: F/A-18; and Spanish Navy: AV-8B
- (Switzerland) Swiss Air Force: F-5F and Hunter
- Republic of China Air Force (Taiwan): F-16, AIDC F-CK-1 Ching-kuo (AGM-65B), and F-5E/F (AGM-65B)
- (Thailand) Royal Thai Air Force: F-16A/B Block 15 OCU/ADF and JAS 39
- (Turkey) Turkish Air Force: F-4 and F-16
- (Tunisia) Tunisian Air Force: F-5

=== Former users ===
- (Germany) German Air Force: F-4F after being upgraded in the early 1980s under Project Peace Rhine, retired in 2013.
- Royal New Zealand Navy: SH-2G; and Royal New Zealand Air Force: A-4K (after being upgraded in the late 1980s under Project Kahu, retired 2001).
- (Sweden) Swedish Air Force: Designated RB 75; used on the AJ37 Viggen and Saab JAS 39 Gripen.
- (United Kingdom) Royal Air Force: Harrier GR7
- Yugoslavia:

== See also ==
- AGM-179 JAGM – (United States)
- AGM-114 Hellfire – (United States)
- Kh-29 – (Soviet Union)
- Kh-25 – (Soviet Union)

Related lists

- List of military aircraft of the United States
- List of missiles
