= Blue eyes (disambiguation) =

Blue eyes is a common pigmentation in the iris of an eye of a mammal.

Blue eyes may also refer to:

== Places ==
- Blue Eye, Albania, a water spring and tourist attraction
- Blue Eye, Arkansas, United States, a town
- Blue Eye, Missouri, United States, a village

== Arts and entertainment ==
=== Music ===
- Blue Eyes, a jazz album by Miki Matsubara
- "Blue Eyes" (Elton John song), 1982
- "Blue Eyes" (Yo Yo Honey Singh song), 2013
- "Blue Eyes", a song by Don Partridge written Richard Kerr, Joan Maitland, 1968
- "Blue Eyes", a song by BZN written Th. Tol, J. Tuijp, C. Tol 1982
- "Blue Eyes", a song by Cary Brothers from the Garden State film soundtrack album
- "Blue Eyes", a song by the International Submarine Band from Safe at Home
- "Blue Eyes", a song by Mika from The Boy Who Knew Too Much
- "Blue Eyes", a song by Taeyeon from Letter to Myself
- "Blue Eyes", a song by The Chevin from Borderland
- "Blue Eyes", a song by Scott Weiland and the Wildabouts from Blaster
- "Blue Eyes", a song by Within Temptation, a B-side of the single "What Have You Done"
- "Blue Eyes", a song by Gary Numan/Tubeway Army, a B-side of the single "Bombers"

=== Other arts and entertainment ===
- Blue Eyes (film), a 2009 Brazilian film
- Blue Eyes (TV series), a 2014-15 Swedish TV series
- Blue Eyes, a nickname of the character Bill Hudson in the animated series Return to the Planet of the Apes
- Blue Eyes, a character in the comics series Sin City
- Blue Eyes, a novel by Jerome Charyn
- Blue Eyes (Ojos azules, in Spanish), a short story by Spanish writer Arturo Pérez-Reverte

== Other uses ==
- Pseudomugilidae, a family of fish known as Blue-eyes
- AGM-79 Blue Eye, an American prototype air-to-surface missile cancelled in the early 1970s
- Blueeyes Productions, an Icelandic film production company
- Nazar (amulet) or Blue Eye, an amulet believed to provide protection against the evil eye
- Blue-eye, a face in British wrestling

== See also ==
- Baby blue eyes, a common wild flower of California
- "Ol' Blue Eyes", a nickname of Frank Sinatra (1915–1998), American singer and actor
- "Jimmy Blue Eyes", nickname of Vincent Alo (1904–2001), high-ranking New York mobster
- The Bluest Eye, a 1970 novel by American author and Nobel Prize recipient Toni Morrison
- American blue-eyed dolls or Japanese friendship dolls, a goodwill program between the children of Japan and the United States
