= AGM-124 Wasp =

Air-to-ground anti-tank missile

The AGM-124 Wasp is a missile developed by the United States. The Wasp grew out of the 1975 WAAM (Wide-Area Anti-Armour Munitions) program initiated by the US Air Force in order to develop a series of new air-to-ground anti-armour weapons for close-support aircraft. The three-pronged program led to the CBU-92/B ERAM (Extended Range Anti-Armour Munition), the CBU-90/B ACM (Anti-Armour Cluster Munition), and the Wasp anti-armour missile. The Wasp is regarded as the most advanced of these weapons.

Development began in 1979, with Boeing and Hughes Aircraft as the primary contractors. The specification called for a small missile which could be carried in large numbers by attack aircraft in multiple dispensers - the A-10 was able to carry several 12 round launcher pods. The Boeing design was unsuccessful, and the USAF selected the Hughes Wasp missile.

The AGM-124A was a small weapon with folding wings and fins to reduce storage space within the launcher. It was intended to be launched in large numbers - 10 or more missiles launched nearly simultaneously was envisaged for a typical attack; the name Wasp derived from this "swarm" tactic. The missiles would follow a pre-programmed path to the target area before activating a millimeter wave active radar homing to identify and home on a specific target. This high resolution radar was able to distinguish targets even against enemy jamming and high background clutter from the ground.

Testing of the radar system began in 1981, and the first prototype AGM-124 took place in 1983. Production was planned for 1987, but in October 1983 the program was cancelled. Most of the other components of the WAAM program were also less than successful, with only the BLU-108/B Skeet submunition in use today.

== Specifications ==
- Length : 1.52 m (5 ft)
- Wingspan : 51 cm (20 in)
- Diameter : 20 cm (8 in)
- Weight : 57 kg (125 lb)
- Range : 10 km (6.2 mi)
- Propulsion : Solid-fueled rocket motor
- Warhead : Shaped charge
