= AGM-12 Bullpup =

- Type: Air-to-ground command guided missile
- Place of origin: United States

Service history
- In service: ASM-N-7 1959–1970s ASM-N-7A/AGM-12B 1965–1970s
- Used by: United States, Australia, Denmark, Greece, Israel, Norway, Taiwan, Turkey, United Kingdom
- Wars: Vietnam War

Production history
- Manufacturer: Martin Marietta, W.L. Maxson
- Produced: 1959–1970
- No. built: 22,100 (total) 4,600 (AGM-12C) 840 (AGM-12E)
- Variants: ASM-N-7, ASM-N-7A/AGM-12B, AGM-12C, GAM-83B/AGM-12D, AGM-12E

Specifications
- Mass: 1,785 pounds (810 kg) (AGM-12C)
- Length: 13.6 feet (4.1 m)
- Diameter: 18 inches (460 mm)
- Wingspan: 48 inches (1.2 m)
- Warhead: Conventional high-explosive (ASM-N-7, ASM-N-7A/AGM-12B) Semi armor-piercing (AGM-12C); W45 Nuclear (GAM-83B/AGM-12D) Cluster munition (AGM-12E)
- Warhead weight: 250 pounds (110 kg) (ASM-N-7A/AGM-12B) 970 pounds (440 kg) (AGM-12C)
- Engine: Rocket; 30,000 pounds-force (130 kN)
- Propellant: Solid (AGM-12A model), Storable, liquid-fuel (others)
- Operational range: 10 nautical miles (12 mi; 19 km)
- Maximum speed: approx. Mach 2
- Guidance system: Line-of-sight radio command
- Launch platform: FJ-4B, A-4D, F-4, F-8, F-105, Draken, F-5A/B Freedom Fighter, F-100 (among others)

The AGM-12 Bullpup is a short-range air-to-ground missile developed by Martin Marietta for the US Navy. It is among the earliest precision guided air-to-ground weapons and the first to be mass produced. It first saw operational use in 1959 on the A-4 Skyhawk, but soon found use on the A-6 Intruder, F-100 Super Sabre, F-105 Thunderchief, F-4 Phantom II, F-8 Crusader, and P-3 Orion in both Navy and US Air Force service, as well as NATO allies. The weapon was guided manually via a small joystick in the aircraft cockpit, which presented a number of problems and its ultimate accuracy was on the order of 10 metres (33 ft), greater than desired. In the 1960s it was increasingly supplanted by fully automatic weapons like the AGM-62 Walleye and AGM-65 Maverick.

== History ==
=== ASM-N-7 Bullpup ===
Development of Bullpup began in 1953 when Korean War experience demonstrated the almost complete inability for conventional bombing to attack point land targets like bridges. There had been great experimentation during World War II on various guided weapons by many of the belligerents, including some operational use of radio control weapons by Germany and the US with varying degrees of success. These experiments mostly ended in the post-war era, especially as nuclear weapons made accuracy a less interesting problem to solve. This left little research into conventional weapons before Korean War started.

A contract tender for a new weapon was released in 1953 calling for a weapon armed with the AN-M57 or AN-M81 bomb and a maximum speed of Mach 2. The contract was won by Martin Marietta in April 1954 and the project was assigned the name ASM-N-7 Bullpup. The initial XASM-N-7 prototypes were powered by the Mark 8 Mod 1 solid propellant rocket motor made by Aerojet-General, which delivered about 38 kN of thrust for 2.5 seconds. The first test launches were carried out in June 1955.

The weapon was guided by the launch aircraft through the manual command to line of sight (MCLOS) method, with the pilot tracking the flight of the missile via two bright flares on the weapon's tail and making corrections using a small joystick in the cockpit. The position of the receiver antenna on the weapon meant that the aircraft had to continue flying in roughly the same direction as the missile in order for the signals to be received from the AN/ARW-73 transmitter, and due to the location of the cockpit on the aircraft, this generally meant the aircraft had to be in a dive toward the target throughout the approach.

Although the weapon did not meet its original requirements exactly, in that it carried only the M81 warhead and reached M1.8, development was otherwise straightforward. The weapon was officially put into service on 25 April 1959 on the A-4 Skyhawks aboard the USS Lexington. This was followed by fittings on the North American FJ-4 Fury and Sikorsky CH-34. Production versions were mostly built by Maxson Electronics.

=== GAM-79 White Lance, Bullpup A ===
The US Air Force was interested in the system as early as 1954, and in 1955 began development of their own version, known as White Lance. Desiring higher performance, White Lance was to use a liquid fuel rocket engine, the Thiokol LR44 which provides approximately 53.9 kN of thrust for 2 seconds. LR44 was originally intended for Sparrow III missile. It used storable hypergolic propellants: inhibited red fuming nitric acid as an oxidizer and MAF-1 as a fuel. MAF-1 is a mixture of 40.5% UDMH, 50.5% diethylenetriamine and 9% acetonitrile. Compared to solid rocket motor, liquid rocket engine provided increased impulse and smokeless exhaust, improving visibility for a pilot. Another change was to move to a newer radio control system, the AN/ARW-77, which allowed off-axis guiding so the aircraft could fly parallel to the target instead of straight at it, greatly increasing visibility and eliminating the need to dive directly at the target.

While they waited for GAM-79, the Air Force also purchased examples of the ASM-N-7, which they put into service under the name GAM-83 on the North American F-100 and Republic F-105. As the development of GAM-79 continued, the Navy also became interested in a liquid fuel engine and had Thiokol build another version, the LR58. These were introduced as the ASM-N-7a Bullpup A in 1960. As this weapon was essentially identical to the planned GAM-79, so that name was dropped and the ASM-N-7a was introduced as the GAM-83A. The Air Force also introduced the GAM-83B, which differed in having a slightly larger diameter to carry the 1.5 kT W45 nuclear warhead.

The GAM-83A was described as "useless" in Vietnam and was withdrawn from action after only a few sorties. In December 1960 saw the first F-100D operationally equipped with the GAM-83A.

For training purposes, Martin produced a guidance system that could be fit to surplus High Velocity Aircraft Rockets, which entered service as the TASM-N-7/TGAM-83.

=== Bullpup B ===
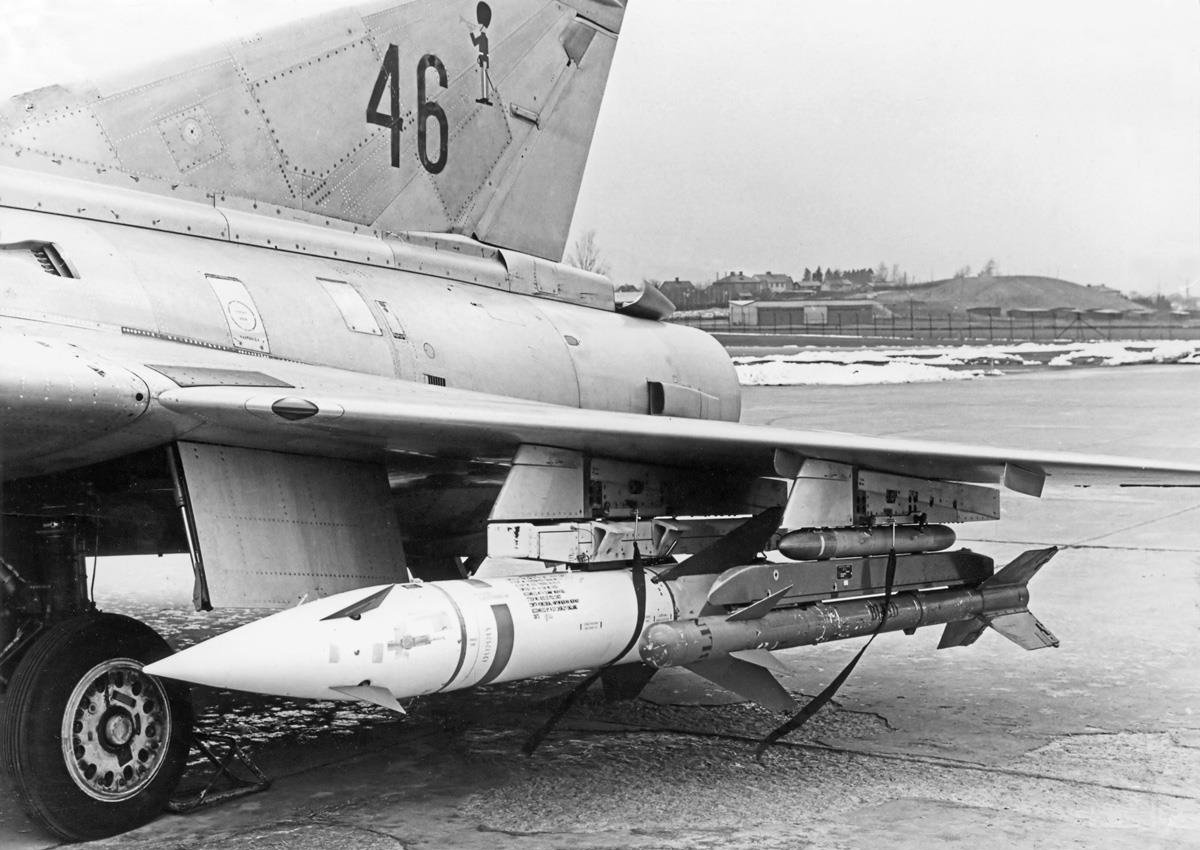
Saab 35XD prototype fitted with a AGM-12B under its left wing

While development of the original versions was still ongoing, development of a significantly larger version, ASM-N-7b Bullpup B, began. This enlarged the warhead to 1,000 pounds (450 kg) and upgraded the motor to the LR62 with much higher thrust. Although the new motor gave the system longer maximum range, the existing systems were already at the limit of the typical pilot's eyesight, and in practice the new model had the same effective range. The first tests were carried out in 1962 and Bullpup B entered service in 1964.

As part of the inter-service effort to align designations of their weapon systems, all Bullpups were renamed AGM-12 in 1963. The original solid-fuel versions became the AGM-12A, which was somewhat confusing given the Navy naming for their liquid-fuel versions. The liquid-fuel versions became AGM-12B, overlapping the ASM-N-7b which became AGM-12C. The Air Force's nuclear GAM-83B became the AGM-12D. The TGAM-83 was renamed ATM-12, lacking a suffix which the new naming rules required.

=== AGM-12E ===
The final version of the Bullpup was the Air Force's AGM-12E. This was a AGM-12C with the warhead replaced with an anti-personnel cluster bomb warhead with 800-830 BLU-26/B bomblets. This was produced in small numbers for use in the Vietnam War.

== Operational service ==
Bullpups were widely used by both the Navy and Air Force during the Vietnam War, with mixed results. In its most famous early use, 16 Air Force F-105's each carrying two AGM-12Bs were part of the group of aircraft that attacked the Thanh Hóa Bridge on 3 April 1965. Because the weapon was manually guided, each aircraft had to line up for attack twice in separate passes. After the attack was completed the bridge was essentially undamaged, and the Bullpups were described as simply "bouncing off" the bridge.

In addition to the lack of destructive power, the requirement to carry out separate passes for each release, and the need to continue guiding the weapon through its flight, led the Air Force to conclude the weapon was inadequate. In the late 1960s they began several development projects to replace the guidance system of the AGM-12C with some sort of fully or semi-automatic guidance. The AGM-79 Blue Eye used a contrast seeker like that in the AGM-65 Maverick; AGM-80 Viper used inertial guidance for airburst operations, and the AGM-83 Bulldog used laser guidance. None of these entered service; other weapons like Maverick and laser guided bombs took over these roles.

Approximately 56,000 Bullpups of all models were produced by the time production ended in 1969, the majority being the A and B models, along with 4,600 AGM-12C, 100 AGM-12D, and 800 AGM-12E. The smaller A/B versions remained in service in the mid-1970s as the newer weapons began to supplant them, with the Navy's last firings during July 1978 when VP-1 patrol aircraft fired three at practice targets. The weapon left Navy service that month. The larger C model remained until the early 1980s.

Production was also undertaken in Norway by Kongsberg Våpenfabrikk in partnership with the UK's de Havilland. While production ramped up, the UK purchased 1,200 from the US and then began deliveries of another 2,500 from Kongsberg. Norway purchased another 1,500 local-built examples, and sold another 2,500 to Turkey under a co-production system. Israel purchased 760 AGM-12 models B and C from the US.

== Design ==
The missile was constructed in two separate portions for the nose and tail. The nose contained the guidance receivers which translated instructions into commands for the electro-pneumatic actuators for the four small delta wing control fins arranged around the nose. The tail section held the two tracking flares and larger wings to maintain flight. The wings had tabs to induce a roll approximately 400 degrees per second. The flight path was provided by a gyroscope controlling the front control fins.

The Bullpup used a Manual Command Line Of Sight guidance system with controlled roll. In flight, the pilot or weapons operator tracked the Bullpup by watching the flares and used a control joystick to steer it toward the target using radio signals. The goal was to direct the missile so that it remained on the line between the pilot and the target.

After launching the Bullpup, best accuracy was maintained by continuing to fly the same track, so that the pilot could sight down the smoke trail and steer the missile from directly behind as much as possible. Unfortunately, one problem quickly discovered by pilots in Vietnam was that gunners on the ground could simply fire at the smoke trail of the missile's flare and have a fairly good chance of hitting the aircraft that had launched—and was still guiding—the missile. Thus, to try to protect their own aircraft, the pilot would "jig" slightly off of the missile's path and hopefully avoid the anti-aircraft fire.

== Operators ==
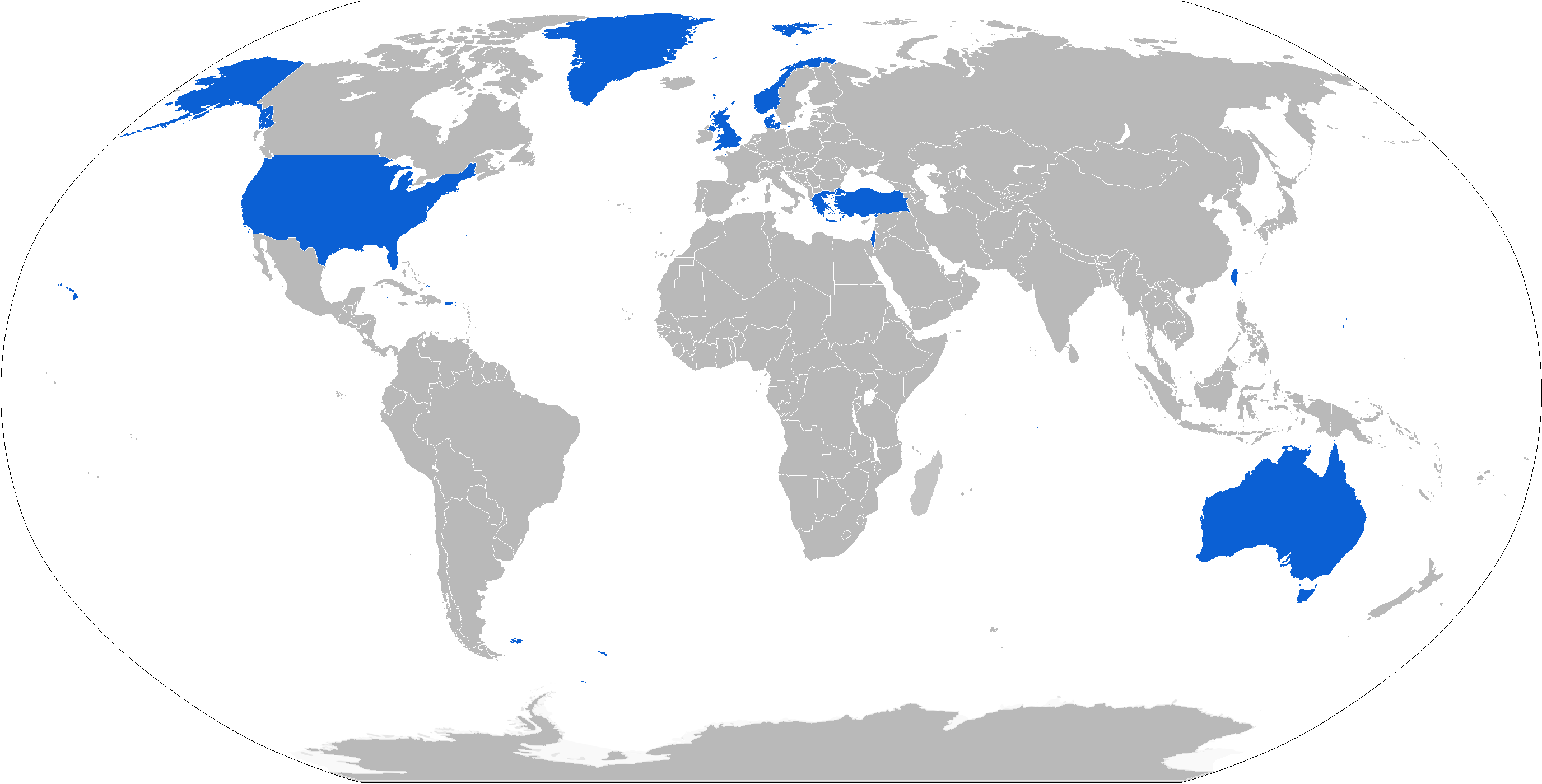
Map with former AGM-12 operators in blue

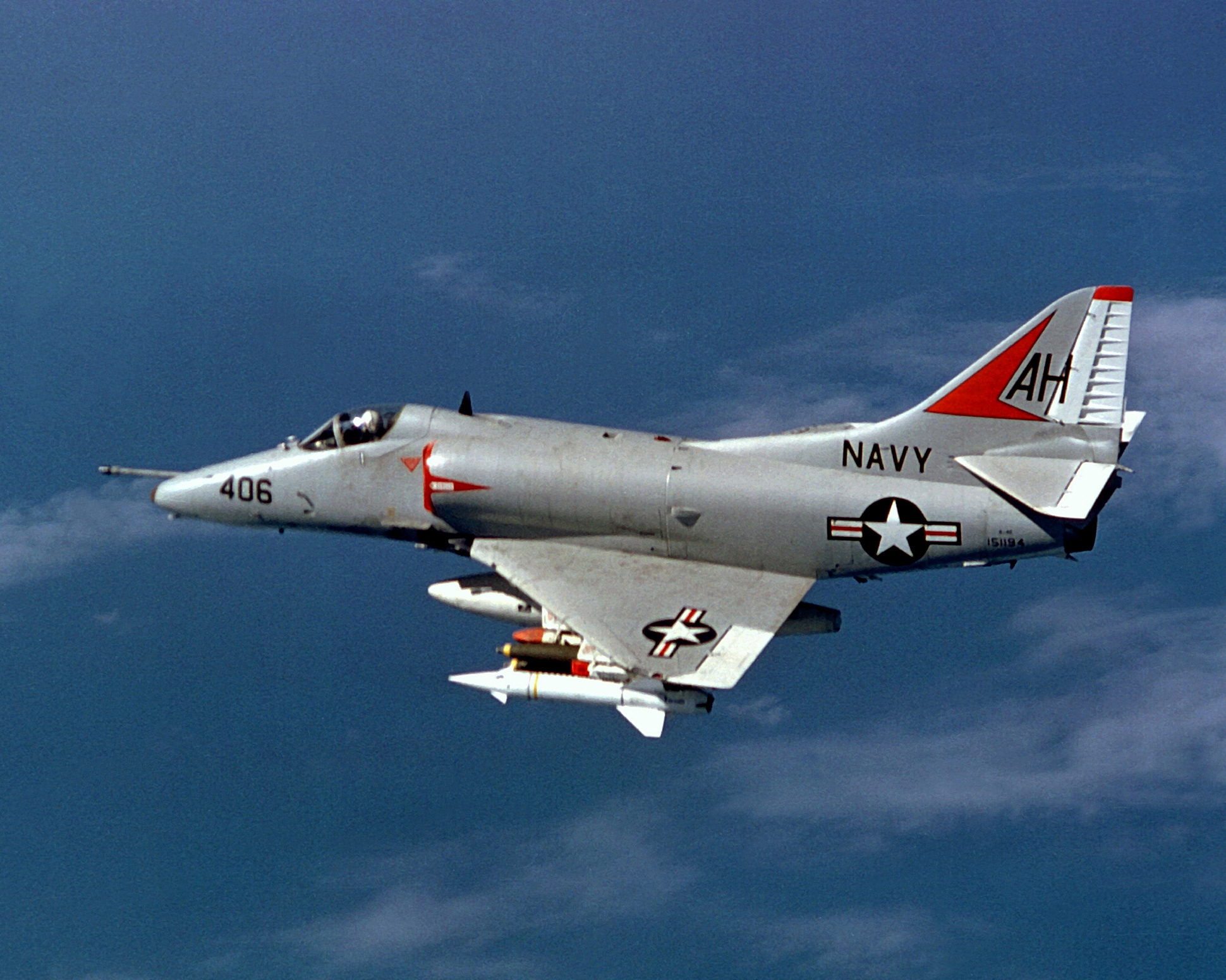
A US Navy A-4E of VA-164 from USS Oriskany (CVA-34) over North Vietnam in November 1967. The Bullpup missile is clearly visible under the port wing

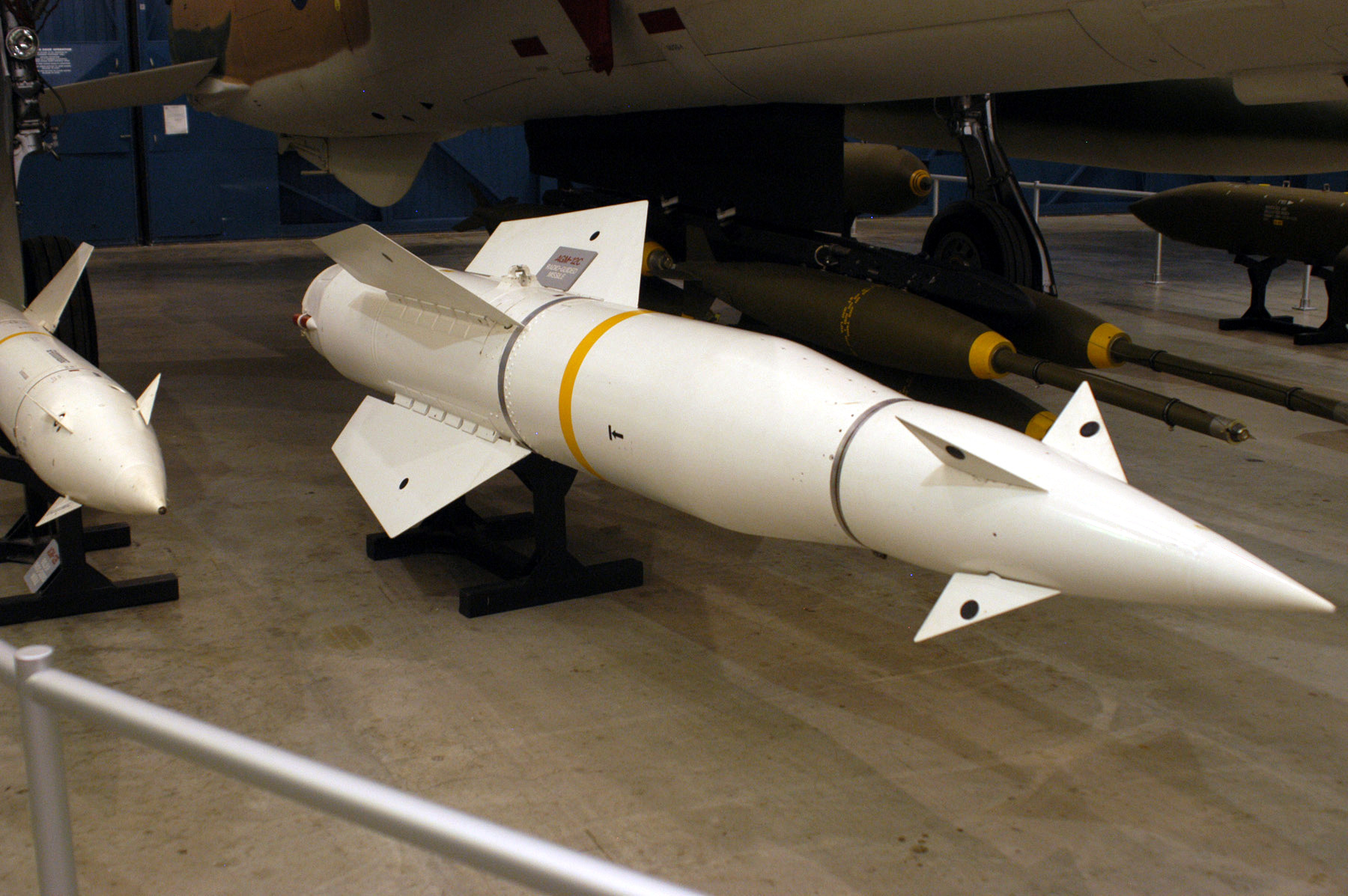
An AGM-12C at the National Museum of the United States Air Force

=== Former operators ===
Australia

- Royal Australian Air Force

Denmark

- Royal Danish Air Force

Greece

- Hellenic Air Force

Israel

- Israel Defense Forces

Norway

- Royal Norwegian Air Force

Republic of Korea

- Republic of Korea Air Force

Taiwan (Republic of China)

- Republic of China Air Force

Turkey

- Turkish Air Force

United Kingdom

- Royal Air Force
- Royal Navy

United States

- United States Air Force
- United States Navy

== See also ==
- Kh-23 (AS-7 'Kerry') – a Soviet command-guided missile developed in response to the Bullpup
- AS-20 – similar French missile developed in the late 1950s
- AJ 168 Martel missile – contemporary Anglo-French missile with TV guidance
- Martin Pescador MP-1000 – an Argentinian guided missile with similar guidance system
- Rb 05 – a comparable Swedish missile
- Henschel Hs 293 - A German rocket-powered, guided bomb developed in WWII.

Related lists

- List of military aircraft of the United States
- List of missiles by nation
