= AGM-83 Bulldog =

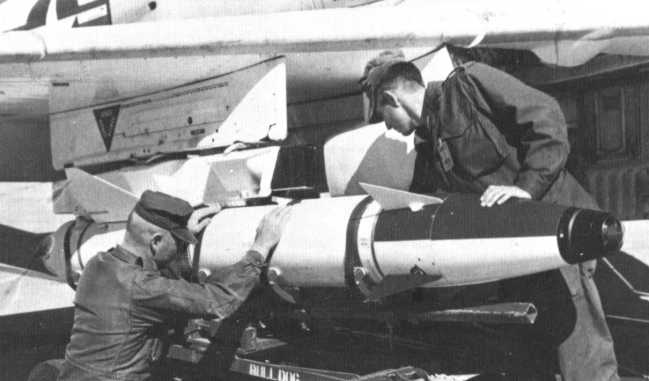
- AGM-83 Bulldog
- Type: Air-to-ground missile
- Place of origin: United States

Production history
- Manufacturer: Texas Instruments

Specifications
- Mass: 280 kg (620 lb)
- Length: 3.20 m (10 ft 6 in)
- Diameter: 0.30 m (12 in)
- Wingspan: 0.94 m (37 in)
- Warhead: 113 kg (250 lb) MK 19 blast-fragmentation
- Engine: Thiokol LR58-RM-4 storable liquid-fuel rocket; 53 kN (12,000 lbf)
- Operational range: 11 km (7 mi)
- Maximum speed: Mach 1.8

The AGM-83 Bulldog was a missile produced by the United States.

The missile had its origins in the AGM-12 Bullpup. The Bullpup used a manual guidance system which required the launching aircraft to continue flying towards the target throughout the missile flight time, making it highly vulnerable to counterattack. The U.S. Navy and Air Force requested a pilot-independent guidance system for the Bullpup which would let the launching aircraft turn away after firing. In 1970, Texas Instruments was given a Navy contract to create a laser-guidance system for the Bullpup that homed in on the reflection of a laser beam. The new missile was designated AGM-83 Bulldog; it was developed in cooperation with the Naval Weapons Center (NWC). The Bulldog was heavily based on the AGM-12B Bullpup A, but used a new 113 kg (250 lb) MK 19 blast-fragmentation warhead.

Firing trials of the AGM-83A took place in 1971–1972, with successful results. The Navy planned to get the Bulldog into service by 1974. A version for ground handling training known as the ATM-83A was also planned. However, in 1972 it was decided that the Navy should instead procure a laser-guided version of the Air Force's AGM-65 Maverick, the AGM-65C—which itself was later cancelled in favour of the AGM-65E.

== Operators ==
- United States: The United States Navy cancelled the AGM-83 prior to service entry.

== Bibliography ==
- Nicklas, Brian D. (2012). The Complete Smithsonian Field Guide: American Missiles: 1962 to the Present Day. Barnsley, UK: Frontline Books. ISBN 978-1-84832-517-3.
