= Qasid =

Qasid may refer to:

- Qasid subtribe of the Yemeni tribe Yafa'
- Qasid Dynasty (1144-1151 CE) of the Iberian Moorish Taifa of Mértola
- Qaṣīd, a type of Jewish poetry written in Arabic from Yemen
- Qased (rocket), an Iranian launch vehicle

== See also ==
- قاصد (disambiguation)
- Qased (disambiguation); including (Arabic: قاصد, romanized: qāṣid, lit. 'courier'; Persian: قاصد, lit. 'messenger')
- Ghased (disambiguation); including (Persian: قاصد, lit. 'messenger';)
- Courier (Indian English: cossid; Hindi: क़ासिद, IPA: /kɑː.sɪd̪/; Urdu: قاصد IPA: /qɑː.sɪd̪/)
- Qasida, a form of Arabic poetry
