= AGM-64 Hornet =

Experimental American missile

The AGM-64 Hornet was a missile produced by the United States.

In the early 1960s, North American Aviation produced a missile design for the U.S. Air Force's Anti-Tank Guided Aircraft Rocket (ATGAR) project. The ATGAR was ultimately not produced, but the Air Force was impressed enough that in 1963 it awarded North American a development contract for the ZAGM-64A Hornet missile. The Hornet was planned as a battlefield missile for use against armored vehicles which would mount an electro-optical guidance system.

The first test firing of the prototype XAGM-64A occurred in December 1964. It was powered by a fast-burning solid rocket motor. The electro-optical guidance system provided a live TV image to the cockpit; the operator would lock the missile onto the desired target before launch and the missile would home in on it automatically.

The Air Force ultimately stopped development of the AGM-64, judging that the similar AGM-65 Maverick had more potential. Although not produced as a weapon, the Hornet became a testbed for various guidance systems including different varieties of electro-optical systems and a magnetic guidance system. The program was terminated in 1968.

The XAGM-64 was briefly revived in the early 1970s, again to test missile guidance systems. The propulsion system of the missile was upgraded, increasing the range to as much as 2.5 miles (4 km). In this configuration the Hornet tested laser guidance packages, the electro-optical system designed for the GBU-8/B and GBU-9/B Homing Bomb System (HOBOS) glide bombs, and the terminal guidance system for the AGM-114 Hellfire anti-tank missile.

== Operators ==
- The United States Air Force canceled the AGM-64 before service entry.
