= Fajr-4 =

Type of air-to-surface rocket

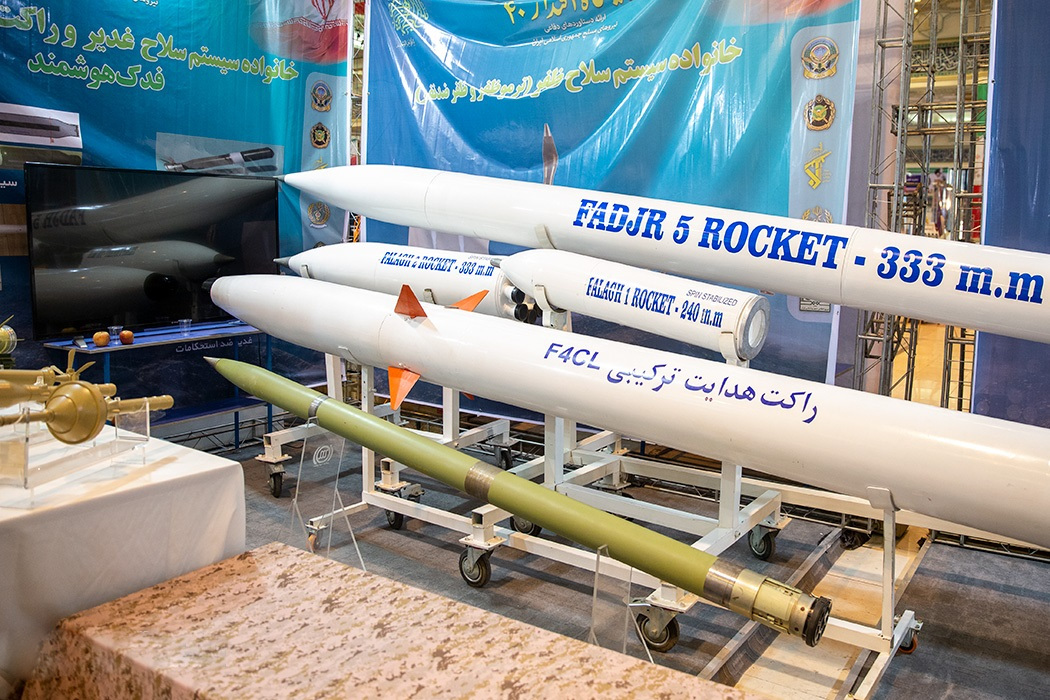
- A Fajr-4 rocket labeled "F4CL" in 2019
- Type: Air-launched rocket
- Place of origin: Iran

Service history
- Used by: IRIAF

Production history
- Designer: AFAGIR
- Designed: May 2014
- Produced: Unknown
- Variants: Fajr-4; Fajr-4CL

Specifications
- Diameter: 333 mm
- Guidance system: Onboard guidance
- Launch platform: Sukhoi Su-22

The Fajr-4 (Persian: فجر-۴) is an Iranian air-to-surface guided rocket that was first unveiled on 9 May 2020 through a video released by the IRGC Aerospace Force. In the video, the missile is seen undergoing a drop test from a Sukhoi Su-22 fighter-bomber. Videos released of Supreme Leader, Ayatollah Seyyed Ali Khamenei, paying a visit to an IRGC Aerospace Force suggest that Iran had already armed its Sukhoi Su-22's with a new air-to-surface missile.

The IRGC has not provided further details of the missile.

== Design ==
The Artillery rocket has a caliber of 333 mm, uses command guidance and has maneuvering fins.

== Variants ==
The missile has two variants, Fajr-4 and Fajr-4CL.
