= AGM-80 Viper =

- Type: Air-to-surface missile
- Place of origin: United States

Service history
- Used by: United States Air Force

Production history
- Manufacturer: Chrysler Corporation Missile Division

Specifications (XAGM-80A)
- Warhead: Bomblet
- Detonation mechanism: Radar altimeter
- Guidance system: Inertial

The AGM-80 Viper was an air-to-surface missile developed by the Chrysler Corporation Missile Division in the 1960s for use by the United States Air Force. Based on the AGM-12 Bullpup, the program was cancelled early in trials. Viper was designed as a "self-guided standoff munition" for use in the Suppression of Enemy Air Defenses ("Iron Hand") role. The Viper, based on the AGM-12C/E Bullpup missile, was fitted with an inertial guidance system, and had a radar altimeter-based fuse to ensure an airburst of the weapon's bomblet payload. It was developed in competition with the AGM-79 Blue Eye missile, but was cancelled in the early 1970s, shortly after the start of flight tests of the prototype missiles, designated XAGM-80A.
