= قاصد =

قاصد (lit. 'messenger' or 'courier') may refer to:

- Qasid (disambiguation)
- Qased (disambiguation)
- Ghased (disambiguation)
