= AGM-63 =

Missile design

The AGM-63 was a missile design produced by the United States. It was conceived in March 1962 when the U.S. Navy issued two requirements for long-range Anti-Radiation Missiles (ARMs) to complement the short-range AGM-45 Shrike. The first was to operate over ranges of up to 50 nmi (90 km), while the second would be capable of operating out to 100 nmi (180 km). Development of the ARM I was approved in 1963; the missile was given the designation ZAGM-63A. However no funds were made available as other ARM programs such as the improved AGM-45 Shrike, and the development of the AGM-78 Standard ARM and AGM-88 HARM were given a higher priority.

The AGM-63 continued on for several years as a purely theoretical missile. No design or configuration was ever settled on, and the project was cancelled in the late 1960s.

== Operators ==
- United States: The United States Navy cancelled the AGM-63 before any examples were produced.
