= Luz (missile) =

Israeli missile

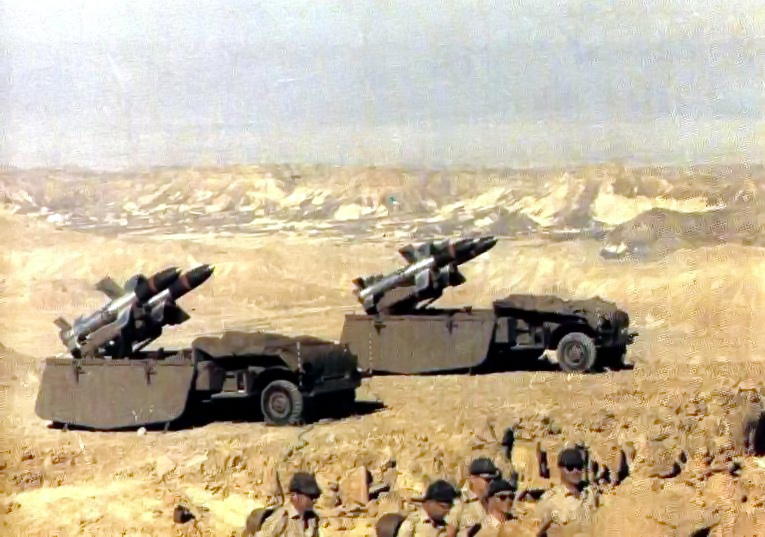
Luz missile, surface-to-surface versions, 1961

The RAFAEL Luz (Hebrew: לוז, Hazelnut) was the first missile built in Israel. RAFAEL developed the missile using knowledge gained from the French MD-620 missile which was built for the Israel Defense Forces by Avions Marcel Dassault-Breguet Aviation. Originally intended to have three versions – surface-to-surface, air-to-ground and anti-ship, technical problems and budget cuts forced Rafael to produce the surface-to-surface and air-to-ground versions alone, although they never saw operational service.

== Development ==
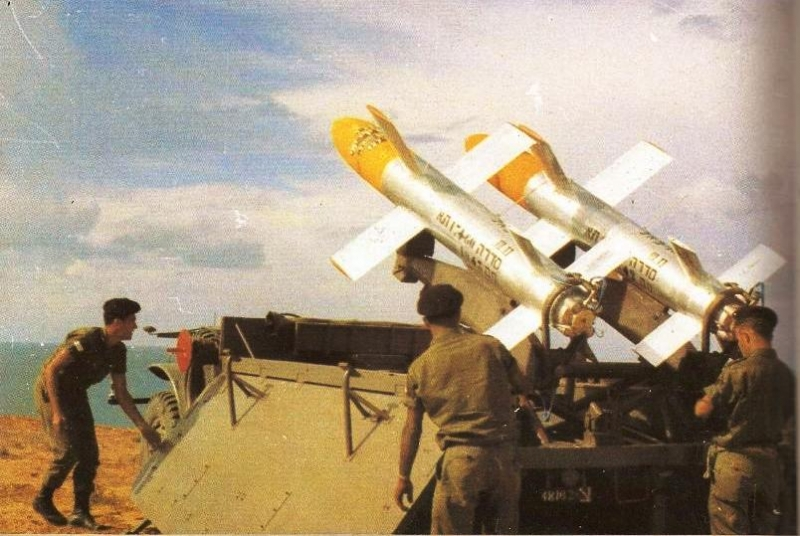
Luz missile, 1961

The missile, with a length of about 3 meters, had a range of 27 km. It was launched from a ground vehicle carrying two missiles, and guided by an operator using a joystick and an electro-optical guidance system.

The anti-ship variant was dropped for budgetary and technical reasons, as the electro-optical guidance system and joystick performed poorly in poor lighting conditions. Ori Even-Tov, an engineer at Rafael, had already proposed alternative solutions, but these were rejected. The anti-ship version would later be developed by Israel Aerospace Industries into the successful IAI Gabriel. In 1962, the surface-to-surface and air-to-ground variants were dropped as well before becoming fully operational, with the IDF instead favoring the use of artillery due to cost-benefit reasons.

While the Luz did not see operational service, the Israeli armaments industry did eventually develop other guided missiles which became operational, such as the Popeye and the smaller Spike NLOS (aka "Tamuz"). These (as well as the Gabriel descendant of the Luz) were not only deployed by the IDF but were also widely exported for use by foreign militaries.
