= AGM-76 Falcon =

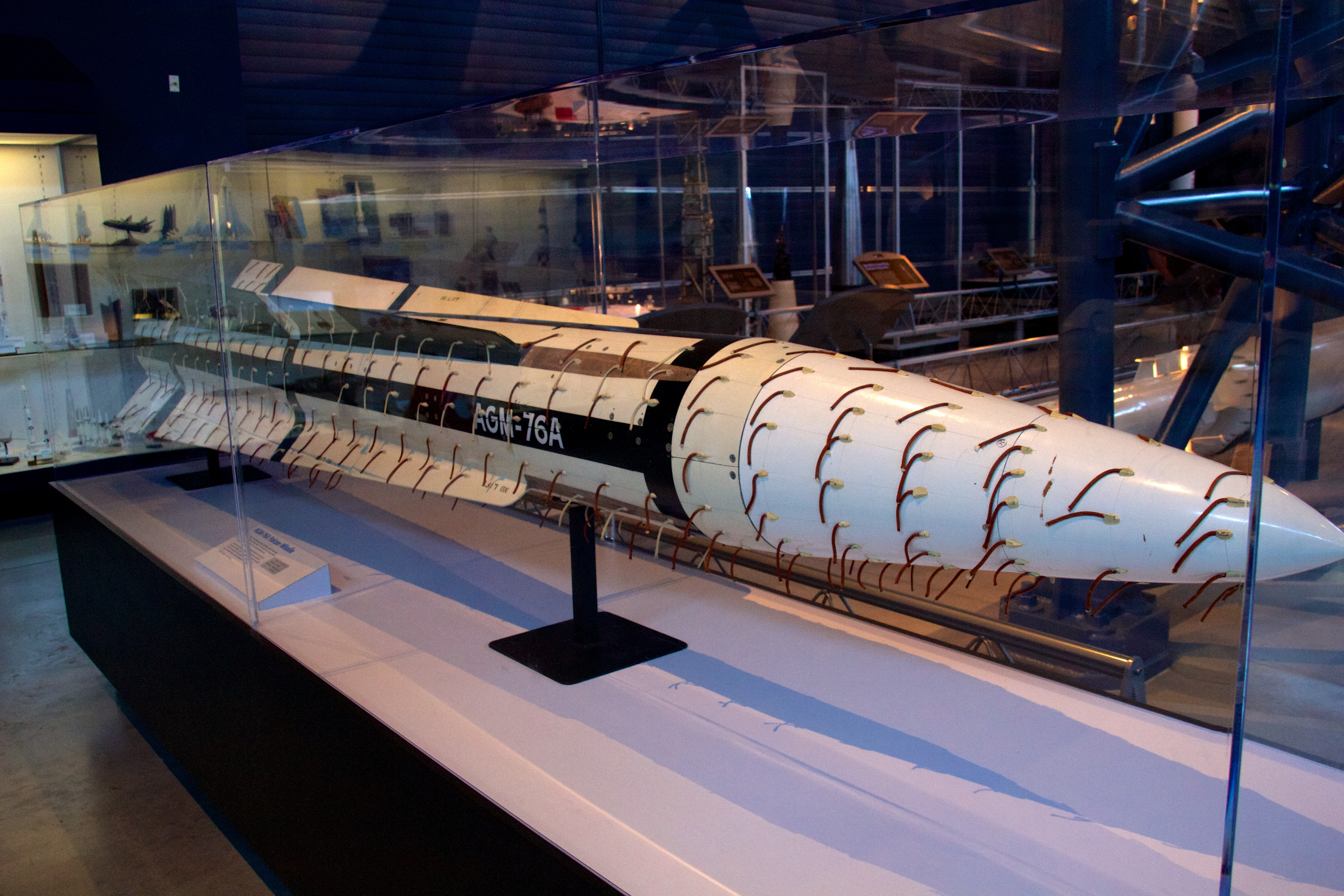
- Aerodynamic test model of the AGM-76A on display at the Steven F. Udvar-Hazy Center
- Type: Anti-radiation missile
- Place of origin: United States

Service history
- Used by: United States Air Force

Production history
- Designed: 1966
- Manufacturer: Hughes Aerospace

Specifications
- Mass: 951 pounds (431 kg)
- Length: 13 feet 4 inches (4.06 m)
- Diameter: 13.5 inches (340 mm)
- Warhead: high explosive
- Warhead weight: 250 pounds (110 kg)
- Engine: Lockheed XSR13-LP-1
- Propellant: Solid fuel
- Maximum speed: Mach 4
- Guidance system: Passive radar homing
- Launch platform: F-4D, A-6B, F-105F

The AGM-76 Falcon was an air-to-surface anti-radiation missile developed by the United States Air Force during the Vietnam War. Intended as a conversion using off-the-shelf parts, it did not go into operational service.

== Overview ==
During 1966, the United States Air Force began development of a heavy anti-radiation missile for use against surface-to-air missile radars in Vietnam. Using existing airframes from the cancelled AIM-47 Falcon heavy air-to-air missile project combined with the seeker head of the AGM-45 Shrike anti-radiation missile, the AGM-76A was fitted with a 250 pounds (110 kg) warhead of the type used in the Mark 81 bomb. Test-firings of AGM-76As were conducted from McDonnell F-4D Phantom II, Republic F-105F Thunderchief, and US Navy Grumman A-6B Intruder aircraft, however the missile was not put into production, the AGM-45 and AGM-78 Standard ARM becoming the standard anti-radiation missiles used by the United States.

== Operators ==
- United States: The United States Air Force cancelled the AGM-76 prior to service entry.
