= Qased =

Iranian bomb

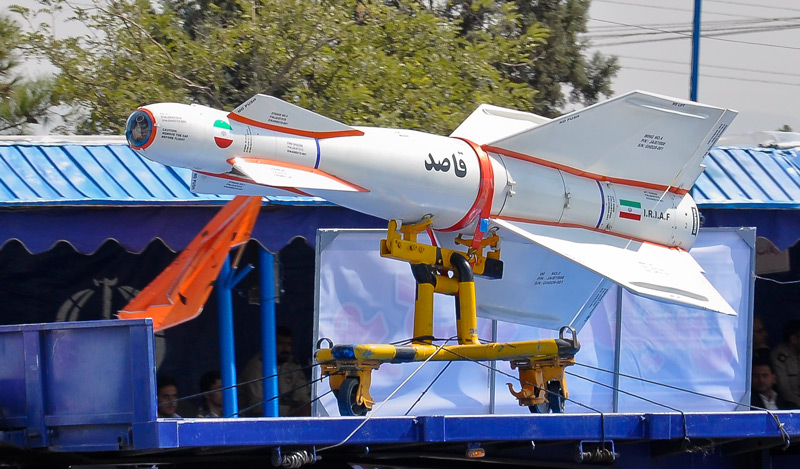
- Type: Smart bomb
- Place of origin: Iran

Specifications
- Mass: 2,000 lb (910 kg)
- Guidance system: Unknown

Qased (also Ghased; Persian: قاصد, lit. 'Messenger') is a 2000-pound (900 kg) Iranian developed smart bomb.

== Guidance ==
Qased is a guided precision weapon, but it is not clear whether it is laser-guided or TV-guided. TV footage of its test-fire suggests it is TV-guided. It is thought to be for use with Iran's F-4 Phantom II fighter jets. Qassed-3 is a later development with a range of 100 kilometers. The missile, which has previously been showcased during military parades, can be deployed on fighter jets. It is equipped with a micro jet engine that enables it to be fired at a speed of 600 kilometers per hour toward targets, and is guided using a seeker head.

== See also ==
- Military of Iran
- Iran's missile forces
- Iranian military industry
- Equipment of the Iranian Army

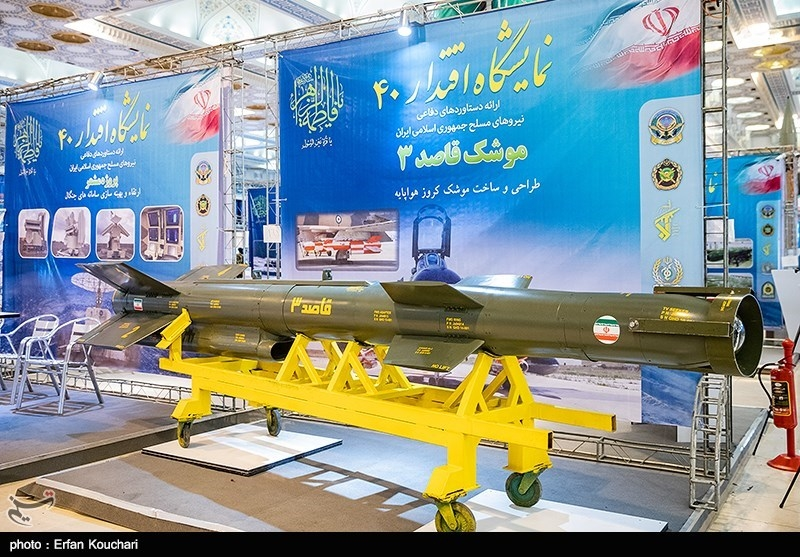
Qassed-3 has a 100 km range
