= Ghassed =

Family of guided bombs and missiles developed by Iran

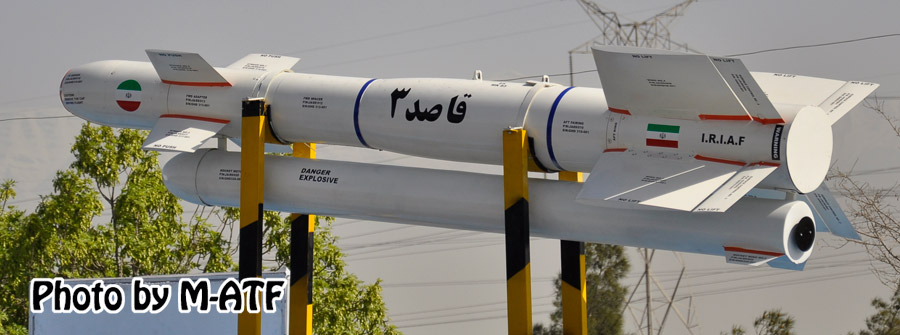
Ghassed 3

The Ghassed is a family of guided bombs and missiles developed by Iran.

It is a highly accurate rocket-boosted smart bomb with a range of 100 km (62 mi) and a 900 kg (2,000 lb) warhead, enabling Iranian Air Force to strike HVTs.

== Overview ==
The Ghassed was designed in accordance with the needs of the Iranian Air Force to strategic arsenals and bombs. Once Ghassed is deployed, Iranian fighter jets can destroy enemy targets with this high-precision bomb without coming into the range of enemy fire. The Ghassed is a powered air-to-surface missile designed for strikes at long range against various targets. It is a rocket-boosted version of the MK-84 bomb, with the rocket motor increasing the launch range and so giving the launch aircraft protection from whatever defenses may protect the target. Ghassed can be deployed by Iran's F-4 and F-5 fighter jets.

A TV/IR-guided bomb has either a conventional television video camera or an infrared camera (for night vision) mounted to its nose. In remote-operation mode, the controller relays information through radio signals to a human operator, who is usually on board the bomber plane. The remote operator relays commands to the control system to steer the bomb through the air—the bomb acts something like a remote-control plane. In this mode, the operator may launch the bomb without a specific target and sight, and then pick up the target from the video as the bomb gets closer to the ground.

== Variants ==
	Variant	Range
Ghassed 1	TV/IR-guided bomb	40 km (25 mi)
Ghassed 2	TV/IR-guided bomb	at least 50 km (31 mi)
Ghassed 3	Rocket-boosted TV/IR/INS/GPS-guided bomb/ALCM	at least 100 km (62 mi)
Warhead	MK-84	900 kg (2,000 lb)
