= AGM-79 Blue Eye =

- Type: Air-to-ground missile (AGM)

Specifications
- Length: 13 feet 7 inches (4.14 m)
- Diameter: 1 foot 6 inches (46 cm)
- Wingspan: 4 feet (1.2 m)
- Guidance system: Electro-optical

The AGM-79 Blue Eye was an air-to-ground missile prototype, developed by the United States in the 1960s.

== Design and development ==
The Blue Eye was a development of the AGM-12 Bullpup, intended to provide a more advanced homing system. The Bullpup was manually steered onto the target, whereas the guidance system in the Blue Eye was an optical area correlation seeker. A TV camera in the missile's nose provided an image to the pilot; he used this to select the target and lock the missile on before firing. Once launched the area correlation system could detect any deviation of the picture compared to the locked image and correct the missile's course accordingly. The Blue Eye used the same airframe as the AGM-12C/E. A radar altimeter was fitted to allow the warhead to explode in an air burst mode. Firing trials took place in late 1968, with the prototype missile designated XAGM-79A. After several years of development the missile was cancelled in the early 1970s.
