= Chinese government sanctions =

Sanctions imposed by the People's Republic of China

The government of the People's Republic of China has imposed financial and trade restrictions against individuals, entities, and jurisdictions whose actions it has determined to be contrary to certain national interests. China maintains three unilateral sanctions programs in addition to implementing the multilateral sanction decisions adopted by the United Nations Security Council.

China's three unilateral sanctions programs are separately administered by the Ministry of Foreign Affairs, Ministry of Commerce, and the Taiwan Affairs Office. The Ministry of Foreign Affairs maintains a sanctions list that imposes travel, trade, and financial restrictions against targeted individuals and entities accused of interfering with China's domestic affairs or endangering China's interests. The Ministry of Commerce maintains the Unreliable Entity List, which heavily restricts allowable business and investment activity in China by listed entities. The Taiwan Affairs Office implements sanctions against Taiwan and targets entities and individuals accused of promoting Taiwanese independence.

Economic sanctions have become an increasingly common instrument in China's foreign policy, particularly as the country's economic power has grown in recent years. Compared to Western sanctions—typically led by the United States and the European Union—China's use of economic sanctions exhibits several notable differences. Influenced by international norms, domestic political and economic structures, and concerns over its international reputation, China tends to employ sanctions in a more restrained and low-profile manner. Although the frequency of Chinese sanctions has risen significantly in recent years, it remains relatively rare for China to impose sanctions as proactively or publicly as Western powers. Several key characteristics distinguish Chinese economic sanctions:

== Ambiguous and informal announcements ==
Unlike in Western countries, Chinese sanctions are not typically imposed through clear legal or administrative orders. Instead, they are often announced via statements by relevant government agencies, serving to create a sense of threat or coercion. For this reason, scholars frequently describe Chinese sanctions as "informal sanctions". A notable example is the dispute between China and South Korea over the deployment of the THAAD missile defense system in 2016. In response, Chinese authorities ordered the suspension of 74 Lotte supermarkets for fire safety violations and informally blacklisted several South Korean companies, effectively halting commercial interactions. These measures lacked formal legal basis but had tangible punitive effects.

This ambiguity allows the Chinese government greater policy flexibility. However, the pattern began to shift following the U.S.–China trade war, as China introduced a series of legal instruments—such as the Unreliable Entity List and the Anti-Foreign Sanctions Law—to formalize and legitimize its use of sanctions. Despite these developments, many sanctions continue to be issued through diplomatic statements without formal legal codification.

In September 2020, the Ministry of Commerce issued new rules allowing for the creation of the Unreliable Entity List, and the National People's Congress followed up soon after in June 2021 by promulgating the Anti-Foreign Sanctions Law, which established a legal framework for maintaining previous sanctions. The law also allowed Chinese ministries, such as the Ministry of Foreign Affairs and the Taiwan Affairs Office, to implement new blocking sanctions against foreign individuals and entities. The Taiwan Affairs Office announced a sanction under the new law in November 2021, and the Ministry of Commerce announced its first Unreliable Entity List designation in February 2023.

== Focus on specific issues ==
Chinese sanctions are often closely tied to issues of diplomacy and national sovereignty; for example, the rare earth export ban on Japan amid the Diaoyu/Senkaku Islands dispute and agriculture import ban on Taiwan during Nancy Pelosi's visit to Taiwan. In practice, Chinese economic sanctions tend to be more symbolic than substantive—frequently described as "more bark than bite." They are often short in duration but intense in impact, aiming to compel the target to yield quickly under pressure.

== Focus on individuals, corporations, and public mobilization ==
Chinese sanctions are primarily directed at foreign individuals and companies, rather than foreign governments—a notable contrast to the approaches of the United States or the European Union, which sometimes target entire governments. In addition, China often encourages its domestic population to reduce consumption of goods from the targeted country, thereby enhancing the impact of sanctions through patriotic appeals. This strategy blends state action with public participation to amplify pressure on the target.

As of August 2024, over 100 individuals and entities have been sanctioned by China.

Scholars have created Chinese Economic Sanctions database from 1949 to 2020, including 135 cases in which China is the sender and 88 cases in which China is the target, and the dataset can be downloaded on GitHub.

== Sanctions announced by the Ministry of Foreign Affairs ==
Date	Country/Region	Individual/entity	Position when sanctioned	Restrictions			Ref.
Date	Country/Region	Individual/entity	Position when sanctioned	Travel restriction (Note: Sanctioned individuals and their immediate family members are prohibited from entering mainland China, Hong Kong, and Macau)	Prohibit contact (Note: Prohibition of Chinese citizens and institutions from dealing with sanctioned individuals or entities)	Asset freeze (Note: Freezing of assets in China)	Ref.
2 December 2019	United States	National Endowment for Democracy		Not announced	Not announced	Not announced	
2 December 2019	United States	National Democratic Institute for International Affairs		Not announced	Not announced	Not announced	
2 December 2019	United States	International Republican Institute		Not announced	Not announced	Not announced	
2 December 2019	United States	Human Rights Watch		Not announced	Not announced	Not announced	
2 December 2019	United States	Freedom House		Not announced	Not announced	Not announced	
13 July 2020	United States	Congressional-Executive Commission on China		Not announced	Not announced	Not announced	
13 July 2020	United States	Sam Brownback	United States Ambassador-at-Large for International Religious Freedom	Not announced	Not announced	Not announced	
13 July 2020 10 August 2020	United States	Marco Rubio (Note: When he is sanctioned by the Chinese government, the Chinese translation of Rubio was 卢比奥 (盧比奧). In January 2025, the Chinese translation is changed to 鲁比奥 (魯比奧).)	United States Senator	Not announced	Not announced	Not announced	
13 July 2020 10 August 2020	United States	Ted Cruz	United States Senator	Not announced	Not announced	Not announced	
13 July 2020 10 August 2020	United States	Chris Smith	Member of the U.S. House of Representatives	Not announced	Not announced	Not announced	
14 July 2020 / 26 October 2020 / 21 February 2022 / 16 February 2023	United States	Lockheed Martin Corporation	U.S. defense company	Yes	Yes	Not announced	
10 August 2020	United States	Josh Hawley	United States Senator	Not announced	Not announced	Not announced	
10 August 2020	United States	Tom Cotton	United States Senator	Not announced	Not announced	Not announced	
10 August 2020	United States	Pat Toomey	United States Senator	Not announced	Not announced	Not announced	
10 August 2020	United States	Carl Gershman	President of the National Endowment for Democracy	Not announced	Not announced	Not announced	
10 August 2020	United States	Derek J. Mitchell	President of the Institute for Democracy in International Affairs	Not announced	Not announced	Not announced	
10 August 2020	United States	Daniel Twining	President of the International Republican Institute	Not announced	Not announced	Not announced	
10 August 2020	United States	Kenneth Roth	Executive director of the Human Rights Watch	Not announced	Not announced	Not announced	
10 August 2020	United States	Michael Abramowitz	President of Freedom House	Not announced	Not announced	Not announced	
26 October 2020	United States	Boeing Defense, Space & Security	U.S. defense company	Not announced	Not announced	Not announced	
26 October 2020 / 21 February 2022 / 16 February 2023	United States	Raytheon Corporation (Note: Renamed to Raytheon Technologies Corporation in 2020)	U.S. defense company	Yes	Yes	Not announced	
26 October 2020	United States	Other individuals and entities that played a role in selling weapons to Taiwan	Not announced	Not announced	Not announced	Not announced	
30 November 2020	United States	John Knaus	Senior Director of the Asia Affairs of the National Endowment for Democracy	Not announced	Not announced	Not announced	
30 November 2020	United States	Manpreet Singh Anand	Asia Project Leader of the Institute for Democracy in International Affair	Not announced	Not announced	Not announced	
30 November 2020	United States	Crystal Rosario	Hong Kong Branch Director of the Institute for Democracy in International Affairs	Not announced	Not announced	Not announced	
30 November 2020	United States	Kelvin Sit Tak-O	Hong Kong Project Director of the Institute for Democracy in International Affairs	Not announced	Not announced	Not announced	
21 January 2021	United States	Mike Pompeo	Former U.S. Secretary of State	Yes	Yes		
21 January 2021	United States	Peter Navarro	Former Director of Office of Trade and Manufacturing Policy	Yes	Yes		
21 January 2021	United States	Robert C. O'Brien	Former U.S. National Security Advisor	Yes	Yes		
21 January 2021	United States	David R. Stilwell	Former Assistant Secretary of State for East Asian and Pacific Affairs	Yes	Yes		
21 January 2021	United States	Matt Pottinger	Former Deputy National Security Advisor	Yes	Yes		
21 January 2021	United States	Alex Azar	Former U.S. Secretary of Health and Human Services	Yes	Yes		
21 January 2021	United States	Keith J. Krach	Former Under Secretary of State for Economic Growth, Energy, and the Environment	Yes	Yes		
21 January 2021	United States	Kelly Craft	Former U.S. Ambassador to the United Nations	Yes	Yes		
21 January 2021	United States	John Bolton	Former U.S. National Security Advisor	Yes	Yes		
21 January 2021	United States	Steve Bannon	Former Senior Counselor to the President	Yes	Yes		
21 January 2021	United States	The remaining 18 personnel have not been announced	Not announced	Yes	Yes		
22 March 2021	European Union; Germany	Reinhard Bütikofer	Member of the European Parliament	Yes	Yes		
22 March 2021	European Union; Germany	Michael Gahler (Note: Cancelled on 30 April 2025)	Member of the European Parliament	Yes	Yes		
22 March 2021	European Union; France	Raphaël Glucksmann	Member of the European Parliament	Yes	Yes		
22 March 2021	European Union; Bulgaria	Ilhan Kyuchyuk	Member of the European Parliament	Yes	Yes		
22 March 2021	European Union; Slovakia	Miriam Lexmann	Member of the European Parliament	Yes	Yes		
22 March 2021	Netherlands	Sjoerd Sjoerdsma	Member of the House of Representatives	Yes	Yes		
22 March 2021	Belgium	Samuel Cogolati	Member of the Chamber of Representatives	Yes	Yes		
22 March 2021	Lithuania	Dovilė Šakalienė	Member of the Seimas	Yes	Yes		
22 March 2021	Germany	Adrian Zenz	Researcher	Yes	Yes		
22 March 2021	Sweden	Björn Fredrik Jerdén	Researcher	Yes	Yes		
22 March 2021	European Union	Political and Security Committee			Yes		
22 March 2021	European Union	European Parliament Subcommittee on Human Rights			Yes		
22 March 2021	Germany	Mercator Institute for China Studies			Yes		
22 March 2021	Denmark	Alliance of Democracies Foundation			Yes		
26 March 2021	United Kingdom	Tom Tugendhat (Note: Cancelled on 30 January 2026)	Member of Parliament; Chairman of the Foreign Affairs Select Committee	Yes	Yes	Yes	
26 March 2021	United Kingdom	Ian Duncan Smith	Member of Parliament	Yes	Yes	Yes	
26 March 2021	United Kingdom	Neil O'Brien	Member of Parliament	Yes	Yes	Yes	
26 March 2021	United Kingdom	David Alton	Member of the House of Lords	Yes	Yes	Yes	
26 March 2021	United Kingdom	Tim Loughton	Member of Parliament	Yes	Yes	Yes	
26 March 2021	United Kingdom	Nus Ghani	Member of Parliament	Yes	Yes	Yes	
26 March 2021	United Kingdom	Helena Kennedy	Member of the House of Lords	Yes	Yes	Yes	
26 March 2021	United Kingdom	Geoffrey Nice	Lawyer	Yes	Yes	Yes	
26 March 2021	United Kingdom	Joanne Smith-Finley	Activist on Uyghur issues	Yes	Yes	Yes	
26 March 2021	United Kingdom	China Research Group			Yes	Yes	
26 March 2021	United Kingdom	Conservative Party Human Rights Commission			Yes	Yes	
26 March 2021	United Kingdom	Uyghur Tribunal			Yes	Yes	
26 March 2021	United Kingdom	Essex Court Chambers			Yes	Yes	
27 March 2021	United States	Gayle Conelly Manchin	Chair of the U.S. Commission on International Religious Freedom	Yes	Yes		
27 March 2021	United States	Tony Perkins	Vice Chair of the U.S. Commission on International Religious Freedom	Yes	Yes		
27 March 2021	Canada	Michael Chong	Member of Parliament	Yes	Yes	Yes	
27 March 2021	Canada	Subcommittee on International Human Rights of the Standing Committee on Foreign Affairs and International Development			Yes		
17 April 2021	Iceland	Jónas Haraldsson	Lawyer				
26 May 2021	United States	Johnnie Moore Jr.	Member of the U.S. Commission on International Religious Freedom	Yes			
23 July 2021 / 30 December 2021	United States	Wilbur Ross	Former U.S. Secretary of Commerce	Yes	Yes	Yes	
23 July 2021 / 30 December 2021	United States	Carolyn Bartholomew	Chairman of the U.S.-China Economic and Security Review Commission	Yes	Yes	Yes	
23 July 2021 / 30 December 2021	United States	Jonathan N. Stivers	Former Director of the Congressional-Executive Commission on China	Yes	Yes	Yes	
23 July 2021 / 30 December 2021	United States	Doyun Kim	National Democratic Institute	Yes	Yes	Yes	
23 July 2021 / 30 December 2021	United States	Adam J. King	International Republican Institute Authorized Representative in Hong Kong	Yes	Yes	Yes	
23 July 2021	United States	Sophie Richardson	Human Rights Watch China Director	Not announced	Not announced	Not announced	
23 July 2021	United States	Hong Kong Democracy Council		Not announced	Not announced	Not announced	
21 December 2021	United States	Nadine Maenza	Chair of the U.S. Commission on International Religious Freedom	Yes	Yes	Yes	
21 December 2021	United States	Nury Turkel	Vice Chair of the U.S. Commission on International Religious Freedom	Yes	Yes	Yes	
21 December 2021	United States	Anurima Bhargava	Member of the U.S. Commission on International Religious Freedom	Yes	Yes	Yes	
21 December 2021	United States	James W. Carr	Member of the U.S. Commission on International Religious Freedom	Yes	Yes	Yes	
5 August 2022	United States	Nancy Pelosi	Speaker of the U.S. House of Representatives	Not announced	Not announced	Not announced	
12 August 2022	Lithuania	Agnė Vaiciukevičiūtė	Deputy Minister of Transport and Communications	Not announced	Not announced	Not announced	
16 September 2022	United States	Gregory J. Hayes	Chairman of Raytheon Technologies	Not announced	Not announced	Not announced	
16 September 2022	United States	Ted Colbert	President and CEO of Boeing Defense, Space & Security	Not announced	Not announced	Not announced	
23 December 2022	United States	Miles Yu	Senior Fellow at the Hudson Institute Visiting Fellow at the Hoover Institution	Yes	Yes	Yes	
23 December 2022	United States	Todd Stein	Deputy Director of the Congressional-Executive Commission on China	Yes	Yes	Yes	
7 April 2023	United States	Sarah May Stern	Chair of the Board of the Hudson Institute	Yes	Yes	Yes	
7 April 2023	United States	John P. Walters	Director of the Hudson Institute	Yes	Yes	Yes	
7 April 2023	United States	John Heubusch	Former executive director of the Ronald Reagan Presidential Library	Yes	Yes	Yes	
7 April 2023	United States	Joanne M. Drake	Chief Executive Officer of the Ronald Reagan Presidential Library	Yes	Yes	Yes	
7 April 2023	United States	Hudson Institute	Civil society	—N/a	Yes	Yes	
7 April 2023	United States	Ronald Reagan Presidential Library and Center for Public Affairs	Civil society	—N/a	Yes	Yes	
13 April 2023	United States	Michael McCaul	Chair of the House Foreign Affairs Committee	Yes	Yes	Yes	
15 September 2023	United States	Lockheed Martin, St. Louis, Missouri Branch	Military industry	Yes	Yes	Yes	
15 September 2023	United States	Northrop Grumman	Military industry	Yes	Yes	Yes	
26 December 2023	United States	Kharon	Data enterprise	Yes	Yes	Yes	
26 December 2023	United States	Edmund Xu	Director of Investigations of Kharon Corporation	Yes	Yes	Yes	
26 December 2023	United States	Nicole Morgret	Researcher at the Center for Advanced Defense Studies	Yes	Yes	Yes	
7 January 2024	United States	BAE Systems Land and Armament	Military industry	Yes	Yes	Yes	
7 January 2024	United States	Alliant Techsystems Operation	Military industry	Yes	Yes	Yes	
7 January 2024	United States	AeroVironment	Military industry	Yes	Yes	Yes	
7 January 2024	United States	ViaSat (Note: Cancelled on 22 July 2024)	Military industry	Yes	Yes	Yes	
7 January 2024	United States	Data Link Solutions	Military industry	Yes	Yes	Yes	
11 April 2024	United States	General Dynamics Land Systems (Note: On 20 May 2024, the Ministry of Commerce listed the above-mentioned enterprises on the list of unreliable entities.)	Military industry	Yes	Yes	Yes	
11 April 2024	United States	General Atomics Aeronautical Systems, Inc. (GA-ASI)	Military industry	Yes	Yes	Yes	
21 May 2024	United States	Mike Gallagher	Former Member of the House of Representatives	Yes	Yes	Yes	
22 May 2024	United States	Lockheed Martin Missiles and Fire Control	Military industry	—N/a	Yes	Yes	
22 May 2024	United States	Lockheed Martin Aeronautics	Military industry	—N/a	Yes	Yes	
22 May 2024	United States	Raytheon/Lockheed Martin Javelin Joint Venture	Military industry	—N/a	Yes	Yes	
22 May 2024	United States	Raytheon Missile Systems	Military industry	—N/a	Yes	Yes	
22 May 2024	United States	General Dynamics Ordnance and Tactical Systems	Military industry	—N/a	Yes	Yes	
22 May 2024	United States	General Dynamics Information Technology	Military industry	—N/a	Yes	Yes	
22 May 2024	United States	General Dynamics Mission Systems	Military industry	—N/a	Yes	Yes	
22 May 2024	United States	Inter-Coastal Electronics	Military industry	—N/a	Yes	Yes	
22 May 2024	United States	System Studies & Simulation	Military industry	—N/a	Yes	Yes	
22 May 2024	United States	IronMountain Solutions	Military industry	—N/a	Yes	Yes	
22 May 2024	United States	Applied Technologies Group	Military industry	—N/a	Yes	Yes	
22 May 2024	United States	Axient	Military industry	—N/a	Yes	Yes	
22 May 2024	United States	Kathy Warden	Chairman, CEO and President of Northrop Grumman Corporation	Yes	Yes	Yes	
22 May 2024	United States	Matthew Bromberg	Vice President of Global Operations of Northrop Grumman Corporation	Yes	Yes	Yes	
22 May 2024	United States	Benjamin R. Davies	Vice President and General Manager of Northrop Grumman Strategic Deterrence System	Yes	Yes	Yes	
22 May 2024	United States	Thomas H. Jones	Vice President and Aviation Systems President of Northrop Grumman Corporation	Yes	Yes	Yes	
22 May 2024	United States	Stephen O'Bryan	Vice President and Global Business Development Officer of Northrop Grumman Corporation	Yes	Yes	Yes	
22 May 2024	United States	Roshan Roeder	Vice President and Defense Systems President of Northrop Grumman Corporation	Yes	Yes	Yes	
22 May 2024	United States	Firat H. Gezen	Vice President of General Dynamics President of General Dynamics Ordnance and Tactical Systems	Yes	Yes	Yes	
22 May 2024	United States	Jason W. Aiken	Executive Vice President for Technology, General Dynamics	Yes	Yes	Yes	
22 May 2024	United States	Amy Gilliland	Senior Vice President, General Dynamics President, General Dynamics Information Technologies	Yes	Yes	Yes	
22 May 2024	United States	Christopher J. Brady	Vice President, General Dynamics President, General Dynamics Mission Systems	Yes	Yes	Yes	
21 June 2024	United States	Lockheed Martin Missile Systems Integration Laboratory	Military industry	Yes	Yes	Yes	
21 June 2024	United States	Lockheed Martin Advanced Technology Laboratories	Military industry	Yes	Yes	Yes	
21 June 2024	United States	Lockheed Martin Ventures	Military industry	Yes	Yes	Yes	
21 June 2024	United States	James D. Taiclet	Chairman, President and CEO of Lockheed Martin	Yes	Yes	Yes	
21 June 2024	United States	Frank Andrew St. John	Chief Operating Officer of Lockheed Martin	Yes	Yes	Yes	
21 June 2024	United States	Jesus Malave	CFO of Lockheed Martin	Yes	Yes	Yes	
12 July 2024	United States	Anduril Industries	Military industry	Yes	Yes	Yes	
12 July 2024	United States	Maritime Tactical Systems	Military industry	Yes	Yes	Yes	
12 July 2024	United States	Pacific Rim Defense	Military industry	Yes	Yes	Yes	
12 July 2024	United States	Aevex Aerospace	Military industry	Yes	Yes	Yes	
12 July 2024	United States	LKD Aerospace	Military industry	Yes	Yes	Yes	
12 July 2024	United States	Summit Technologies Inc.	Military industry	Yes	Yes	Yes	
12 July 2024	United States	Wahid Nawabi	Chairman, President and chief executive officer of AeroVironment	Yes	Yes	Yes	
12 July 2024	United States	Kevin McDonnell	Senior Vice President and Chief Financial Officer of Anduril Industries	Yes	Yes	Yes	
12 July 2024	United States	Brian William Schimpf	CEO of Anduril Industries	Yes	Yes	Yes	
12 July 2024	United States	Matthew Marley Grimm	Chief Operating Officer of Anduril Industries	Yes	Yes	Yes	
12 July 2024	United States	Gregory Michael Kausner	Senior Vice President of Global Defense, Anduril Industries	Yes	Yes	Yes	
1 August 2024	United States	Jim McGovern	Member of the House of Representatives	Yes	Yes	Yes	
18 September 2024	United States	Sierra Nevada Corporation	Military industry	—N/a	Yes	Yes	
18 September 2024	United States	Stick Rudder Enterprises LLC	Military industry	—N/a	Yes	Yes	
18 September 2024	United States	Cubic Corporation	Military industry	—N/a	Yes	Yes	
18 September 2024	United States	S3 AeroDefense	Military industry	—N/a	Yes	Yes	
18 September 2024	United States	TCOM, Limited Partnership	Military industry	—N/a	Yes	Yes	
18 September 2024	United States	TextOre	Military industry	—N/a	Yes	Yes	
18 September 2024	United States	Planate Management Group	Military industry	—N/a	Yes	Yes	
18 September 2024	United States	ACT1 Federal	Military industry	—N/a	Yes	Yes	
18 September 2024	United States	Exovera	Military industry	—N/a	Yes	Yes	
10 October 2024	United States	Edge Autonomy Operations LLC	Military industry	—N/a	Yes	Yes	
10 October 2024	United States	Huntingdon Ingalls Industries Inc.	Military industry	—N/a	Yes	Yes	
10 October 2024	United States	Skydio Inc.	Military industry	—N/a	Yes	Yes	
10 October 2024	United States	Steven R. Rudder	Founder of Stick Rudder Enterprises LLC	Yes	Yes	Yes	
10 October 2024	United States	James William Ickes II	Vice President of Sierra Nevada Corporation	Yes	Yes	Yes	
10 October 2024	United States	David Keith Sutton	Lockheed Martin Asia Director	Yes	Yes	Yes	
10 October 2024	United States	Yeong-Tae Pak	Vice President of Aerospace Environment Corporation	Yes	Yes	Yes	
10 October 2024	United States	Patrick Edward Jankowski	Director of Indo-Pacific Programs, Northrop Grumman Corporation	Yes	Yes	Yes	
10 October 2024	United States	John Purvis	Former CEO of Edge Autonomous Operations	Yes	Yes	Yes	
10 October 2024	United States	Josh Brungardt	Chief Operating Officer of Edge Autonomous Operations	Yes	Yes	Yes	
10 October 2024	United States	Christopher Douglas Kastner	President and CEO of Huntington Ingalls Industries, Inc.	Yes	Yes	Yes	
10 October 2024	United States	Adam Bry	Co-founder and CEO of Skydio	Yes	Yes	Yes	
10 October 2024	United States	Tom Moss	General Manager of Asia Pacific Region, Skydio	Yes	Yes	Yes	
5 December 2024	United States	Teledyne Brown Engineering Inc.	Military industry	—N/a	Yes	Yes	
5 December 2024	United States	BRINC Drones Inc.	Military industry	—N/a	Yes	Yes	
5 December 2024	United States	Rapid Flight LLC	Military industry	—N/a	Yes	Yes	
5 December 2024	United States	Red Six Solutions	Military industry	—N/a	Yes	Yes	
5 December 2024	United States	Shield AI Inc.	Military industry	—N/a	Yes	Yes	
5 December 2024	United States	SYNEXXUS Inc.	Military industry	—N/a	Yes	Yes	
5 December 2024	United States	Firestorm Labs Inc.	Military industry	—N/a	Yes	Yes	
5 December 2024	United States	Kratos Unmanned Aerial Systems Inc.	Military industry	—N/a	Yes	Yes	
5 December 2024	United States	HavocAI	Military industry	—N/a	Yes	Yes	
5 December 2024	United States	Neros Technologies	Military industry	—N/a	Yes	Yes	
5 December 2024	United States	Cyberlux Corporation	Military industry	—N/a	Yes	Yes	
5 December 2024	United States	Domo Tactical Communications	Military industry	—N/a	Yes	Yes	
5 December 2024	United States	Group W	Military industry	—N/a	Yes	Yes	
5 December 2024	United States	Barbara Borgonovi	President of Naval Power Strategic Business Unit, Raytheon	Yes	Yes	Yes	
5 December 2024	United States	Gerard Hueber	Vice President of Naval Power Strategic Business Unit, Raytheon	Yes	Yes	Yes	
5 December 2024	United States	Richard D. Crawford	Founder and CEO of United Technologies Systems Operating Company	Yes	Yes	Yes	
5 December 2024	United States	Beth Edler	President of the Data Link Solutions	Yes	Yes	Yes	
5 December 2024	United States	Blake Resnick	Founder and CEO of BRINC Drone Inc.	Yes	Yes	Yes	
5 December 2024	United Kingdom	Charles Woodburn	CEO of BAE Systems	Yes	Yes	Yes	
21 December 2024	Canada	Uyghur Rights Advocacy Project	Civil society	Yes	Yes	Yes	
21 December 2024	Canada	Canada-Tibet Committee	Civil society	Yes	Yes	Yes	
21 December 2024	Canada	Mehmet Tohti	Executive Director of the Uyghur Rights Advocacy Project	Yes	Yes	Yes	
21 December 2024	Canada	Jasmine Kainth	Policy and Advocacy Director of the Uyghur Rights Advocacy Project	Yes	Yes	Yes	
21 December 2024	Canada	David Matas	Legal Advisor of the Uyghur Rights Advocacy Project	Yes	Yes	Yes	
21 December 2024	Canada	Sarah Teich	Legal Advisor of the Uyghur Rights Advocacy Project	Yes	Yes	Yes	
21 December 2024	Canada	John Packer	Legal Advisor of the Uyghur Rights Advocacy Project	Yes	Yes	Yes	
21 December 2024	Canada	Clive Ansley	Legal Advisor of the Uyghur Rights Advocacy Project	Yes	Yes	Yes	
21 December 2024	Canada	Yonah Diamond	Legal Advisor of the Uyghur Rights Advocacy Project	Yes	Yes	Yes	
21 December 2024	Canada	Justine Bernatchez	Legal Advisor of the Uyghur Rights Advocacy Project	Yes	Yes	Yes	
21 December 2024	Canada	Linden Dales	Legal Advisor of the Uyghur Rights Advocacy Project	Yes	Yes	Yes	
21 December 2024	Canada	Charles Burton	Policy Advisor of the Uyghur Rights Advocacy Project	Yes	Yes	Yes	
21 December 2024	Canada	Margarett Mccuaig Johnston	Policy Advisor of the Uyghur Rights Advocacy Project	Yes	Yes	Yes	
21 December 2024	Canada	Marcus Kolga	Policy Advisor of the Uyghur Rights Advocacy Project	Yes	Yes	Yes	
21 December 2024	Canada	Scott Simon	Policy Advisor of the Uyghur Rights Advocacy Project	Yes	Yes	Yes	
21 December 2024	Canada	Conor Healy	Research Consultant of the Uyghur Rights Advocacy Project	Yes	Yes	Yes	
21 December 2024	Canada	Geoffrey Aharon	Research Consultant of the Uyghur Rights Advocacy Project	Yes	Yes	Yes	
21 December 2024	Canada	Samphe Lhalungpa	Chair of the Canada-Tibet Committee	Yes	Yes	Yes	
21 December 2024	Canada	Luisa Durante	Vice Chair of the Canada-Tibet Committee	Yes	Yes	Yes	
21 December 2024	Canada	Sherap Therchin	Executive Director of the Canada-Tibet Committee	Yes	Yes	Yes	
21 December 2024	Canada	Eliza von Baeyer	Director of the Canada-Tibet Committee	Yes	Yes	Yes	
21 December 2024	Canada	Youngdoung Tenzin	Community Events Manager of the Tibet Council of Canada	Yes	Yes	Yes	
27 December 2024	United States	Insitu, Inc.	Military enterprises	—N/a	Yes	Yes	
27 December 2024	United States	Hudson Technologies Co.	Military enterprises	—N/a	Yes	Yes	
27 December 2024	United States	Saronic Technologies, Inc.	Military enterprises	—N/a	Yes	Yes	
27 December 2024	United States	Raytheon Canada	Military enterprises	—N/a	Yes	Yes	
27 December 2024	United States	Raytheon Australia	Military enterprises	—N/a	Yes	Yes	
27 December 2024	United States	Aerkomm Inc.	Military enterprises	—N/a	Yes	Yes	
27 December 2024	United States	Oceaneering International, Inc.	Military enterprises	—N/a	Yes	Yes	
9 January 2025	South Africa	Ivan Meyer and his family	Federal Chairperson of the Democratic Alliance	Yes	Yes	Yes	
1 July 2025	Philippines	Francis Tolentino	Former Senate Majority Leader	Yes	—N/a	—N/a	
8 September 2025	Japan	Hei Seki	Member of the House of Councillors	Yes	Yes	Yes	
15 December 2025	Japan	Shigeru Iwasaki	Political Advisor to the Executive Yuan	Yes	Yes	Yes	
26 December 2025	United States	Northrop Grumman Systems Corporation	Military industry	—N/a	Yes	Yes	
26 December 2025	United States	L3Harris Maritime Services	Military industry	—N/a	Yes	Yes	
26 December 2025	United States	Boeing in St. Louis	Military industry	—N/a	Yes	Yes	
26 December 2025	United States	Gibbs & Cox, Inc.	Military industry	—N/a	Yes	Yes	
26 December 2025	United States	Advanced Acoustic Concepts	Military industry	—N/a	Yes	Yes	
26 December 2025	United States	VSE Corporation	Military industry	—N/a	Yes	Yes	
26 December 2025	United States	Sierra Technical Services, Inc.	Military industry	—N/a	Yes	Yes	
26 December 2025	United States	Red Cat Holdings, Inc.	Military industry	—N/a	Yes	Yes	
26 December 2025	United States	Teal Drones, Inc.	Military industry	—N/a	Yes	Yes	
26 December 2025	United States	ReconCraft	Military industry	—N/a	Yes	Yes	
26 December 2025	United States	High Point Aerotechnologies	Military industry	—N/a	Yes	Yes	
26 December 2025	United States	Epirus, Inc.	Military industry	—N/a	Yes	Yes	
26 December 2025	United States	Dedrone Holdings Inc.	Military industry	—N/a	Yes	Yes	
26 December 2025	United States	Area-I	Military industry	—N/a	Yes	Yes	
26 December 2025	United States	Blue Force Technologies	Military industry	—N/a	Yes	Yes	
26 December 2025	United States	Dive Technologies	Military industry	—N/a	Yes	Yes	
26 December 2025	United States	Vantor	Military industry	—N/a	Yes	Yes	
26 December 2025	United States	Intelligent Epitaxy Technology, Inc.	Military industry	—N/a	Yes	Yes	
26 December 2025	United States	Rhombus Power Inc.	Military industry	—N/a	Yes	Yes	
26 December 2025	United States	Lazarus Enterprises Inc.	Military industry	—N/a	Yes	Yes	
26 December 2025	United States	Palmer Luckey	Founder of Anduril Industries	Yes	Yes	Yes	
26 December 2025	United States	John Cantillon	Vice President of L3Harris Technologies, Inc., Vice President and Principal Accounting Officer of L3Harris Maritime Services	Yes	Yes	Yes	
26 December 2025	United States	Michael J. Carnovale	President and chief executive officer of Advanced Acoustic Concepts	Yes	Yes	Yes	
26 December 2025	United States	John A. Cuomo	President and chief executive officer of VSE Corporation	Yes	Yes	Yes	
26 December 2025	United States	Mitch McDonald	President of Teal Drones, Inc.	Yes	Yes	Yes	
26 December 2025	United States	Anshuman Roy	Founder and chief executive officer of Rhombus Power Inc.	Yes	Yes	Yes	
26 December 2025	United States	Dan Smoot	President and chief executive officer of Vantor	Yes	Yes	Yes	
26 December 2025	United States	Aaditya Devarakonda	Chief Executive Officer of Dedrone Holdings Inc.	Yes	Yes	Yes	
26 December 2025	United States	Ann Wood	President of High Point Aerotechnologies	Yes	Yes	Yes	
26 December 2025	United States	Jay Hoflich	Co-founder and chief executive officer of ReconCraft	Yes	Yes	Yes	
30 March 2026	Japan	Keiji Furuya	Member of the House of Representatives	Yes	Yes	Yes	
11 June 2026	Philippines	Gilberto Teodoro Jr.	Philippine Defense Secretary	Yes	Yes	No	
12 October 2026	Paraguay	Gustavo Emigdio Villate Samaniego	Minister of Communications	Yes	Yes	Yes	
12 October 2026	Belize	Francis Fonseca	Minister for Foreign Affairs, Foreign Trade, Education, Culture, Science and Technology	Yes	Yes	Yes	

== Sanctions announced by the Ministry of Commerce ==
=== Unreliable Entity List ===
As of 9 October 2025, a total of 72 entities (all of which are from the United States) were included in the Unreliable Entities List, of which 55 were under sanctions. Except for two entities that were retaliated against by the second Trump administration for imposing tariffs on China, the rest were sanctioned for United States arms sales to Taiwan.

Date	Country/Region	Entity	Restrictions			Ref.
Date	Country/Region	Entity	Travel restrictions (Note: Listed companies' executives are prohibited from entering mainland China, Hong Kong, and Macau, and existing work or residency permits are cancelled)	Trade restrictions (Note: Listed companies are prohibited from engaging in import and export trade with mainland China, Hong Kong and Macau)	Investment restrictions (Note: Prohibits new investments by listed companies in mainland China, Hong Kong, and Macau)	Ref.
16 February 2023	United States	Lockheed Martin Corporation	Yes	Yes	Yes	
16 February 2023	United States	Raytheon Missiles & Defense	Yes	Yes	Yes	
20 May 2024	United States	General Atomics Aeronautical Systems	Yes	Yes	Yes	
20 May 2024	United States	General Dynamics Land Systems	Yes	Yes	Yes	
20 May 2024	United States	Boeing Defense, Space & Security	Yes	Yes	Yes	
2 January 2025	United States	General Dynamics Information Technology	Yes	Yes	Yes	
2 January 2025	United States	General Dynamics Mission Systems	Yes	Yes	Yes	
2 January 2025	United States	General Dynamics Ordnance and Tactical Systems	Yes	Yes	Yes	
2 January 2025	United States	Lockheed Martin Advanced Technology Laboratory	Yes	Yes	Yes	
2 January 2025	United States	Lockheed Martin Aeronautics	Yes	Yes	Yes	
2 January 2025	United States	Lockheed Martin Missiles and Fire Control	Yes	Yes	Yes	
2 January 2025	United States	Lockheed Martin Missile System Integration Laboratory	Yes	Yes	Yes	
2 January 2025	United States	Lockheed Martin Ventures	Yes	Yes	Yes	
2 January 2025	United States	Raytheon/Lockheed Martin Javelin Joint Venture	Yes	Yes	Yes	
2 January 2025	United States	Raytheon Missile Systems	Yes	Yes	Yes	
14 January 2025	United States	Anduril Industries	Yes	Yes	Yes	
14 January 2025	United States	Applied Technologies Group	Yes	Yes	Yes	
14 January 2025	United States	Axient	Yes	Yes	Yes	
14 January 2025	United States	Inter-Coastal Electronics	Yes	Yes	Yes	
14 January 2025	United States	IronMountain Solutions	Yes	Yes	Yes	
14 January 2025	United States	Maritime Tactical Systems	Yes	Yes	Yes	
14 January 2025	United States	System Studies & Simulation	Yes	Yes	Yes	
15 January 2025	United States	Aevex Aerospace	Yes	Yes	Yes	
15 January 2025	United States	LKD Aerospace	Yes	Yes	Yes	
15 January 2025	United States	Pacific Rim Defense	Yes	Yes	Yes	
15 January 2025	United States	Summit Technologies, Inc.	Yes	Yes	Yes	
4 February 2025	United States	Illumina, Inc.	Yes	Yes	Yes	
4 February 2025	United States	PVH Corp.	Yes	Yes	Yes	
4 March 2025 (Note: The sanctions are ceased since 10 November 2025.)	United States	ACT1 Federal	Yes	Yes	Yes	
4 March 2025	United States	Cubic Corporation	Yes	Yes	Yes	
4 March 2025	United States	Exovera	Yes	Yes	Yes	
4 March 2025	United States	Huntington Ingalls Industries Inc.	Yes	Yes	Yes	
4 March 2025	United States	Planate Management Group	Yes	Yes	Yes	
4 March 2025	United States	S3 AeroDefense	Yes	Yes	Yes	
4 March 2025	United States	Stick Rudder Enterprises LLC	Yes	Yes	Yes	
4 March 2025	United States	TCOM, Limited Partnership	Yes	Yes	Yes	
4 March 2025	United States	Teledyne Brown Engineering, Inc.	Yes	Yes	Yes	
4 March 2025	United States	TextOre	Yes	Yes	Yes	
4 April 2025 (Note: The sanctions are suspended since 14 May 2025 for 90 days, and extended since 12 August 2025 for another 90 days, and extended since 10 November 2025 for one year.)	United States	BRINC Drones, Inc.	Yes	Yes	Yes	
4 April 2025	United States	Domo Tactical Communications	Yes	Yes	Yes	
4 April 2025	United States	Firestorm Labs, Inc.	Yes	Yes	Yes	
4 April 2025	United States	HavocAI	Yes	Yes	Yes	
4 April 2025	United States	Insitu, Inc.	Yes	Yes	Yes	
4 April 2025	United States	Kratos Unmanned Aerial Systems, Inc.	Yes	Yes	Yes	
4 April 2025	United States	Neros Technologies	Yes	Yes	Yes	
4 April 2025	United States	Rapid Flight LLC	Yes	Yes	Yes	
4 April 2025	United States	Red Six Solutions	Yes	Yes	Yes	
4 April 2025	United States	Skydio Inc.	Yes	Yes	Yes	
4 April 2025	United States	SYNEXXUS, Inc.	Yes	Yes	Yes	
9 April 2025 (Note: The sanctions are suspended since 14 May 2025, and ceased since 12 August 2025.)	United States	Cyberlux Corporation	Yes	Yes	Yes	
9 April 2025	United States	Edge Autonomy Operations LLC	Yes	Yes	Yes	
9 April 2025	United States	Group W	Yes	Yes	Yes	
9 April 2025	United States	Hudson Technologies Co.	Yes	Yes	Yes	
9 April 2025	United States	Shield AI, Inc.	Yes	Yes	Yes	
9 April 2025	United States	Sierra Nevada Corporation	Yes	Yes	Yes	
25 September 2025	United States	Aerkomm Inc.	No	Yes	Yes	
25 September 2025	United States	Oceaneering International, Inc.	No	Yes	Yes	
25 September 2025	United States	Saronic Technologies, Inc.	No	Yes	Yes	
9 October 2025	United States	AeroVironment, Inc.	No	Yes	Yes	
9 October 2025	United States	Alliant Techsystems Operations LLC	No	Yes	Yes	
9 October 2025	United States	BAE Systems, Inc.	No	Yes	Yes	
9 October 2025	United States	Cubic Global Defense	No	Yes	Yes	
9 October 2025	United States	Dedrone by Axon	No	Yes	Yes	
9 October 2025	United States	DZYNE Technologies	No	Yes	Yes	
9 October 2025	United States	Elbit Systems of America, LLC	No	Yes	Yes	
9 October 2025	United States	Epirus, Inc.	No	Yes	Yes	
9 October 2025	United States	Exelis Inc.	No	Yes	Yes	
9 October 2025	United States	Halifax International Security Forum	No	Yes	Yes	
9 October 2025	United States	Recorded Future, Inc.	No	Yes	Yes	
9 October 2025	United States	TechInsights Inc. (Note: Including the following subsidiaries: TechInsights Europe Limited, TechInsights Europe Sp zo.o, TechInsights Japan KK, TechInsights USA Inc, TechInsights Korea Co. Ltd., TechInsights Market Analysis Limited, SARL Strategy Analytics, Strategy Analytics GmbH Market Research and Management Consulting, SARI Strategy Analytics Private Limited)	No	Yes	Yes	
9 October 2025	United States	Teledyne FLIR, LLC	No	Yes	Yes	
9 October 2025	United States	VSE Corporation	No	Yes	Yes	
14 October 2025	United States	Hanwha Shipping LLC	No	Yes	Yes	
14 October 2025	United States	Hanwha Philly Shipyard Inc.	No	Yes	Yes	
14 October 2025	United States	Hanwha Ocean USA International LLC	No	Yes	Yes	
14 October 2025	United States	Hanwha Shipping Holdings LLC	No	Yes	Yes	
14 October 2025	United States	HS USA Holdings Corp.	No	Yes	Yes	

=== Countermeasures ===
Date	Country/Region	Entity	Restrictions			Ref.
Date	Country/Region	Entity	Travel restrictions (Note: Listed companies' executives are prohibited from entering mainland China, Hong Kong, and Macau, and existing work or residency permits are cancelled)	Trade restrictions (Note: Listed companies are prohibited from engaging in import and export trade with mainland China, Hong Kong and Macau)	Investment restrictions (Note: Prohibits new investments by listed companies in mainland China, Hong Kong, and Macau)	Ref.
13 August 2025	European Union Lithuania	Urbo Bankas	No	Yes	No	
13 August 2025	European Union Lithuania	AB Mano Bankas	No	Yes	No	

== Sanctions announced by the Taiwan Affairs Office ==
Date	Individual/entity	Position when sanctioned	Restrictions			List type	Ref.
Date	Individual/entity	Position when sanctioned	Travel restrictions (Note: Sanctioned individuals and their immediate family members are prohibited from entering mainland China, Hong Kong, and Macau)	Prohibition on communication (Note: Mainland Chinese residents and institutions are prohibited from trading with sanctions individuals or from dealing with punished entities.)	Freezing of property (Note: Freezing property in mainland China)	List type	Ref.
5 November 2021	Su Tseng-chang	Premier of the Republic of China	Yes	Yes		(Note: The persons listed on the left are those who have been included in the list of "Taiwan independence diehards" by the Taiwan Affairs Office.)	(Note: In addition to the above, other measures include: restricting institutions affiliated with them from cooperating with relevant organizations and individuals in the mainland, never allowing companies affiliated with them and their financiers to make profits in the mainland, and taking other necessary disciplinary measures. Criminal liability will be pursued for life.)
5 November 2021	You Si-kun	President of the Legislative Yuan	Yes	Yes		(Note: The persons listed on the left are those who have been included in the list of "Taiwan independence diehards" by the Taiwan Affairs Office.)	(Note: In addition to the above, other measures include: restricting institutions affiliated with them from cooperating with relevant organizations and individuals in the mainland, never allowing companies affiliated with them and their financiers to make profits in the mainland, and taking other necessary disciplinary measures. Criminal liability will be pursued for life.)
5 November 2021	Joseph Wu	Minister of Foreign Affairs	Yes	Yes		(Note: The persons listed on the left are those who have been included in the list of "Taiwan independence diehards" by the Taiwan Affairs Office.)	(Note: In addition to the above, other measures include: restricting institutions affiliated with them from cooperating with relevant organizations and individuals in the mainland, never allowing companies affiliated with them and their financiers to make profits in the mainland, and taking other necessary disciplinary measures. Criminal liability will be pursued for life.)
3 August 2022	Taiwan Foundation for Democracy		Yes	Yes		(Note: The institutions listed on the left are included in the list of institutions affiliated with "Taiwan independence diehards" by the Taiwan Affairs Office.)	
3 August 2022	International Cooperation and Development Fund		Yes	Yes		(Note: The institutions listed on the left are included in the list of institutions affiliated with "Taiwan independence diehards" by the Taiwan Affairs Office.)	
3 August 2022	Xuande Energy		Yes	Yes		(Note: The institutions listed on the left are included in the enterprises that donated to institutions affiliated with "Taiwan independence diehards" list by the Taiwan Affairs Office.)	
3 August 2022	Lingwang Technology		Yes	Yes		(Note: The institutions listed on the left are included in the enterprises that donated to institutions affiliated with "Taiwan independence diehards" list by the Taiwan Affairs Office.)	
3 August 2022	Dawn Medical		Yes	Yes		(Note: The institutions listed on the left are included in the enterprises that donated to institutions affiliated with "Taiwan independence diehards" list by the Taiwan Affairs Office.)	
3 August 2022	SkyEye Satellite Technology		Yes	Yes		(Note: The institutions listed on the left are included in the enterprises that donated to institutions affiliated with "Taiwan independence diehards" list by the Taiwan Affairs Office.)	
16 August 2022	Hsiao Bi-khim	Taiwanese Representative in the U.S.	Yes	Yes			
16 August 2022	Wellington Koo	Secretary-General of the National Security Council	Yes	Yes			
16 August 2022	Tsai Chi-chang	Vice President of the Legislative Yuan	Yes	Yes			
16 August 2022	Ker Chien-ming	Majority Leader of the Legislative Yuan	Yes	Yes			
16 August 2022	Lin Fei-fan	Deputy Secretary-General of the Democratic Progressive Party	Yes	Yes			
16 August 2022	Chen Jiau-hua	Chairperson of the New Power Party	Yes	Yes			
16 August 2022	Wang Ting-yu	Member of the Legislative Yuan	Yes	Yes			
16 August 2022	Huang Yu-lin	Executive Director of the Taiwan Foundation for Democracy	Yes	Yes			
16 August 2022	Xiang Tianyi	Secretary General of the International Cooperation and Development Foundation	Yes	Yes			
7 April 2023	Prospect Foundation		Yes	Yes			
7 April 2023	Council of Asian Liberals and Democrats		Yes	Yes			
15 May 2024	Edward Huang	Current affairs commentator	Yes	Yes			
15 May 2024	Liu Bao-jie	Television host	Yes	Yes			
15 May 2024	Yu Beichen	Taoyuan City Councillor	Yes	Yes			
15 May 2024	Wang Yi-chuan	Executive Director of the Policy Committee of the Democratic Progressive Party	Yes	Yes			
15 May 2024	Lee Cheng-hao	Current affairs commentator	Yes	Yes			
14 October 2024	Robert Tsao	Founder of the United Microelectronics Corporation	Yes	Yes			
14 October 2024	Puma Shen	Member of the Legislative Yuan	Yes	Yes			
14 October 2024	Kuma Academy		Yes	Yes			
5 June 2025	Sicuens International			Yes			
7 January 2026	Liu Shyh-fang	Minister of the Interior	Yes	Yes			
7 January 2026	Cheng Ying-yao	Minister of Education	Yes	Yes			

== Enforcement of UN Security Council sanctions resolutions ==
Country/Entity	Ministry of Foreign Affairs Notice Number	UN Security Council Resolutions	Ref.
Libya	No. 3/10, 2020, No. 3, 2021	2509/2571	
Islamic State al-Qaeda	No. 1 of 2019, No. 5 of 2020	1267/1989/2253	
Mali	No. 4, 2019, No. 8/10, 2020	2484/2541	
Somalia	No. 6, 2019, No. 10/11, 2020	2498/2551	
Iraq	No. 10, 2020	1518	
Democratic Republic of the Congo	No. 3, 2019, No. 7/10, 2020	2478/2528	
Sudan	No. 10 of 2020, No. 1 of 2021	2562	
Taliban	No. 10, 2020	1988	
Guinea-Bissau	No. 10, 2020	2048	
Central African Republic	No. 1/9/10, 2020	2507/2536	
Yemen	No. 4/10, 2020, No. 2, 2021	2511/2564	
South Sudan	No. 2, 2019, No. 6/10, 2020	2471/2521	
North Korea	International Group Letter [2013] No. 39 (Note: Issued by the International Cooperation Department of the Ministry of Transport, not the Ministry of Foreign Affairs)	2094	

== Other ==
=== Chinese transliteration of Rubio ===
Originally, some news agencies reported the Chinese transliteration of Marco Rubio was 卢比奥 (盧比奧), while the Foreign Affairs Ministry used another transliteration 鲁比欧 (魯比歐). When he assumed the secretary of State in January 2025, some news agencies reported that Chinese transliteration of Rubio was changed to 鲁比奥 (魯比奧), which under the transliteration guideline adpoted by Xinhua News Agency. Under the guideline, Ru referred to 鲁 (魯), and Lu referred to 卢 (盧). Therefore, the standardized Chinese transliteration is "鲁比奥 (魯比奧)". The spokesperson of the Foreign Affairs Ministry Mao Ning stated that "instead of how his name is translated in Chinese, it's his actual name in English that is more important". On 12 May 2026, Rubio headed to Beijing with U.S. President Donald Trump for the first time. According to reports, this arrangement might have been made possible after China changed his name's transliteration. However, The New York Times reported that this was false, noting that Xinhua News Agency had used both transliterations for about a decade.
