= Unreliable Entity List =

Sanctions by the Chinese government

The Unreliable Entity List (Chinese: 不可靠实体清单; pinyin: Bù Kěkào Shítǐ Qīngdān) is a Chinese government sanctions system announced by the Ministry of Commerce on 31 May 2019. Its specific provisions were officially released on 19 September 2020. The Ministry of Commerce stated that foreign enterprises, organizations or individuals that do not comply with market rules, violate the spirit of contracts, block or cut off supplies to Chinese enterprises for non-commercial purposes, and seriously damage the legitimate rights and interests of Chinese enterprises will be included in the list. Individuals and entities included in the list will be fined and restricted from traveling to China.

== History ==
On 31 May 2019, a spokesperson for the Ministry of Commerce stated that, in accordance with relevant laws and regulations, China will establish an “unreliable entity list” system. The spokesperson said that foreign companies, organizations or individuals that do not comply with market rules, violate the spirit of contracts, impose blockades or supply cuts on Chinese companies for non-commercial purposes, or seriously damage the legitimate rights and interests of Chinese companies would be included in the unreliable entity list. On June 8, 2019, according to The New York Times, the National Development and Reform Commission held a meeting with American, British and South Korean technology companies such as Microsoft, Dell, Samsung and SK Hynix. Representatives from the Ministry of Commerce and the Ministry of Industry and Information Technology also attended. The New York Times quoted sources as saying that the Chinese government representatives clearly warned at the meeting that if any company wanted to withdraw its production lines from China, exceed the standard purpose of safe dispersal, or participate in the implementation of the United States government's sanctions on China, it could be included in the unreliable entity list and be punished. On 19 September 2020, China officially released the "Regulations on the Unreliable Entities List". Foreign entities included in the unreliable entities list may be restricted or prohibited from engaging in import and export activities related to China, or from investing in China.

== Content ==
The regulations of the Ministry of Commerce state that, in order to safeguard national sovereignty, security and development interests, maintain a fair and free international economic and trade order, and protect the legitimate rights and interests of Chinese enterprises, other organizations or individuals, the "Regulations on the Unreliable Entities List" are formulated in accordance with the Foreign Trade Law, the National Security Law and other relevant laws. The Ministry stated that China would establish a working mechanism with the participation of relevant departments of the central government to be responsible for the organization and implementation of the unreliable entities list system and to decide whether to investigate the behavior of relevant foreign entities. Foreign entities included in the unreliable entities list may, depending on the actual situation, decide to take one or more of the following measures:

1. Restricting or prohibiting it from engaging in import and export activities related to China;
2. Restricting or prohibiting its investment in China;
3. Restricting or prohibiting the entry of its relevant personnel, means of transport, etc.;
4. Restrict or cancel the work permits, stay or residence qualifications of their relevant personnel in China;
5. A fine of appropriate amount shall be imposed according to the severity of the circumstances;
6. Other necessary measures.

=== Inclusion criteria ===
According to a 2020 order issued by the Ministry of Commerce, the Chinese government will take into account the following factors when deciding whether to include an entity in the "Unreliable Entities List":

1. Does the entity's behavior stem from non-commercial purposes and violate market rules, the spirit of contracts, and internationally accepted trade and economic rules?
2. Does this entity engage in any actions such as imposing blockades, supply disruptions, or other discriminatory measures against Chinese entities?
3. Does the entity's behavior stem from non-commercial purposes and violate market rules, the spirit of contracts, and internationally accepted trade and economic rules?
4. Does the entity's actions cause substantial damage to the legitimate rights and interests of Chinese enterprises, other organizations, or individuals?
5. Does this entity pose a threat or harm to China's national sovereignty, security, or development interests?
6. Other factors that to be considered.

== List ==
As of 9 October 2025, a total of 72 entities (all of which are from the United States) were included in the Unreliable Entities List, of which 55 were under sanctions. Except for two entities that were retaliated against by the second Trump administration for imposing tariffs on China, the rest were sanctioned for United States arms sales to Taiwan.

Date	Country/Region	Entity	Restrictions			Ref.
Date	Country/Region	Entity	Travel restrictions (Note: Listed companies' executives are prohibited from entering mainland China, Hong Kong, and Macau, and existing work or residency permits are cancelled)	Trade restrictions (Note: Listed companies are prohibited from engaging in import and export trade with mainland China, Hong Kong and Macau)	Investment restrictions (Note: Prohibits new investments by listed companies in mainland China, Hong Kong, and Macau)	Ref.
16 February 2023	United States	Lockheed Martin Corporation	Yes	Yes	Yes	
16 February 2023	United States	Raytheon Missiles & Defense	Yes	Yes	Yes	
20 May 2024	United States	General Atomics Aeronautical Systems	Yes	Yes	Yes	
20 May 2024	United States	General Dynamics Land Systems	Yes	Yes	Yes	
20 May 2024	United States	Boeing Defense, Space & Security	Yes	Yes	Yes	
2 January 2025	United States	General Dynamics Information Technology	Yes	Yes	Yes	
2 January 2025	United States	General Dynamics Mission Systems	Yes	Yes	Yes	
2 January 2025	United States	General Dynamics Ordnance and Tactical Systems	Yes	Yes	Yes	
2 January 2025	United States	Lockheed Martin Advanced Technology Laboratory	Yes	Yes	Yes	
2 January 2025	United States	Lockheed Martin Aeronautics	Yes	Yes	Yes	
2 January 2025	United States	Lockheed Martin Missiles and Fire Control	Yes	Yes	Yes	
2 January 2025	United States	Lockheed Martin Missile System Integration Laboratory	Yes	Yes	Yes	
2 January 2025	United States	Lockheed Martin Ventures	Yes	Yes	Yes	
2 January 2025	United States	Raytheon/Lockheed Martin Javelin Joint Venture	Yes	Yes	Yes	
2 January 2025	United States	Raytheon Missile Systems	Yes	Yes	Yes	
14 January 2025	United States	Anduril Industries	Yes	Yes	Yes	
14 January 2025	United States	Applied Technologies Group	Yes	Yes	Yes	
14 January 2025	United States	Axient	Yes	Yes	Yes	
14 January 2025	United States	Inter-Coastal Electronics	Yes	Yes	Yes	
14 January 2025	United States	IronMountain Solutions	Yes	Yes	Yes	
14 January 2025	United States	Maritime Tactical Systems	Yes	Yes	Yes	
14 January 2025	United States	System Studies & Simulation	Yes	Yes	Yes	
15 January 2025	United States	Aevex Aerospace	Yes	Yes	Yes	
15 January 2025	United States	LKD Aerospace	Yes	Yes	Yes	
15 January 2025	United States	Pacific Rim Defense	Yes	Yes	Yes	
15 January 2025	United States	Summit Technologies, Inc.	Yes	Yes	Yes	
4 February 2025	United States	Illumina, Inc.	Yes	Yes	Yes	
4 February 2025	United States	PVH Corp.	Yes	Yes	Yes	
4 March 2025 (Note: The sanctions are ceased since 10 November 2025.)	United States	ACT1 Federal	Yes	Yes	Yes	
4 March 2025	United States	Cubic Corporation	Yes	Yes	Yes	
4 March 2025	United States	Exovera	Yes	Yes	Yes	
4 March 2025	United States	Huntington Ingalls Industries Inc.	Yes	Yes	Yes	
4 March 2025	United States	Planate Management Group	Yes	Yes	Yes	
4 March 2025	United States	S3 AeroDefense	Yes	Yes	Yes	
4 March 2025	United States	Stick Rudder Enterprises LLC	Yes	Yes	Yes	
4 March 2025	United States	TCOM, Limited Partnership	Yes	Yes	Yes	
4 March 2025	United States	Teledyne Brown Engineering, Inc.	Yes	Yes	Yes	
4 March 2025	United States	TextOre	Yes	Yes	Yes	
4 April 2025 (Note: The sanctions are suspended since 14 May 2025 for 90 days, and extended since 12 August 2025 for another 90 days, and extended since 10 November 2025 for one year.)	United States	BRINC Drones, Inc.	Yes	Yes	Yes	
4 April 2025	United States	Domo Tactical Communications	Yes	Yes	Yes	
4 April 2025	United States	Firestorm Labs, Inc.	Yes	Yes	Yes	
4 April 2025	United States	HavocAI	Yes	Yes	Yes	
4 April 2025	United States	Insitu, Inc.	Yes	Yes	Yes	
4 April 2025	United States	Kratos Unmanned Aerial Systems, Inc.	Yes	Yes	Yes	
4 April 2025	United States	Neros Technologies	Yes	Yes	Yes	
4 April 2025	United States	Rapid Flight LLC	Yes	Yes	Yes	
4 April 2025	United States	Red Six Solutions	Yes	Yes	Yes	
4 April 2025	United States	Skydio Inc.	Yes	Yes	Yes	
4 April 2025	United States	SYNEXXUS, Inc.	Yes	Yes	Yes	
9 April 2025 (Note: The sanctions are suspended since 14 May 2025, and ceased since 12 August 2025.)	United States	Cyberlux Corporation	Yes	Yes	Yes	
9 April 2025	United States	Edge Autonomy Operations LLC	Yes	Yes	Yes	
9 April 2025	United States	Group W	Yes	Yes	Yes	
9 April 2025	United States	Hudson Technologies Co.	Yes	Yes	Yes	
9 April 2025	United States	Shield AI, Inc.	Yes	Yes	Yes	
9 April 2025	United States	Sierra Nevada Corporation	Yes	Yes	Yes	
25 September 2025	United States	Aerkomm Inc.	No	Yes	Yes	
25 September 2025	United States	Oceaneering International, Inc.	No	Yes	Yes	
25 September 2025	United States	Saronic Technologies, Inc.	No	Yes	Yes	
9 October 2025	United States	AeroVironment, Inc.	No	Yes	Yes	
9 October 2025	United States	Alliant Techsystems Operations LLC	No	Yes	Yes	
9 October 2025	United States	BAE Systems, Inc.	No	Yes	Yes	
9 October 2025	United States	Cubic Global Defense	No	Yes	Yes	
9 October 2025	United States	Dedrone by Axon	No	Yes	Yes	
9 October 2025	United States	DZYNE Technologies	No	Yes	Yes	
9 October 2025	United States	Elbit Systems of America, LLC	No	Yes	Yes	
9 October 2025	United States	Epirus, Inc.	No	Yes	Yes	
9 October 2025	United States	Exelis Inc.	No	Yes	Yes	
9 October 2025	United States	Halifax International Security Forum	No	Yes	Yes	
9 October 2025	United States	Recorded Future, Inc.	No	Yes	Yes	
9 October 2025	United States	TechInsights Inc. (Note: Including the following subsidiaries: TechInsights Europe Limited, TechInsights Europe Sp zo.o, TechInsights Japan KK, TechInsights USA Inc, TechInsights Korea Co. Ltd., TechInsights Market Analysis Limited, SARL Strategy Analytics, Strategy Analytics GmbH Market Research and Management Consulting, SARI Strategy Analytics Private Limited)	No	Yes	Yes	
9 October 2025	United States	Teledyne FLIR, LLC	No	Yes	Yes	
9 October 2025	United States	VSE Corporation	No	Yes	Yes	
14 October 2025	United States	Hanwha Shipping LLC	No	Yes	Yes	
14 October 2025	United States	Hanwha Philly Shipyard Inc.	No	Yes	Yes	
14 October 2025	United States	Hanwha Ocean USA International LLC	No	Yes	Yes	
14 October 2025	United States	Hanwha Shipping Holdings LLC	No	Yes	Yes	
14 October 2025	United States	HS USA Holdings Corp.	No	Yes	Yes	
