= RTX Corporation =

American multinational aerospace and defense conglomerate

- Trade name: RTX
- Formerly: Raytheon Technologies Corporation (2020–2023)
- Type: Public
- Traded as: NYSE: RTX; S&P 100 component; S&P 500 component
- ISIN: US75513E1010
- Industry: Aerospace; Defense; Information Security; Electronics
- Predecessors: United Technologies; Raytheon Company
- Founded: April 3, 2020; 6 years ago
- Founders: Vannevar Bush; Laurence K. Marshall; Charles G. Smith (as American Appliance Company, later Raytheon in 1922); Frederick Rentschler (as United Technologies in 1934)
- Headquarters: Arlington, Virginia, U.S.
- Area served: Worldwide
- Key people: Christopher T. Calio (CEO and chairman)
- Revenue: ▲US$88.6 billion (2025)
- Operating income: ▲US$9.30 billion (2025)
- Net income: ▲US$6.73 billion (2025)
- Total assets: ▲US$171 billion (2025)
- Total equity: ▲US$65.2 billion (2025)
- Number of employees: 180,000 (2025)
- Subsidiaries: Collins Aerospace; Pratt & Whitney; Raytheon
- Website: rtx.com

RTX Corporation, formerly Raytheon Technologies Corporation, is an American multinational aerospace and defense conglomerate headquartered in Arlington, Virginia. (Note: On June 7, 2022, the company announced plans to move its global headquarters to Arlington, Virginia, from Waltham, Massachusetts. The move was completed in July.) It is one of the largest aerospace and defense manufacturers in the world by revenue and market capitalization, as well as one of the largest providers of intelligence services. In 2023, the company's rank in the Forbes Global 2000 was 79. RTX manufactures aircraft engines, avionics, aerostructures, cybersecurity solutions, guided missiles, air defense systems, satellites, and drones. The company is a large military contractor, getting much of its revenue from the U.S. government.

The company was formed in 2020 by a merger of equals between the aerospace subsidiaries of United Technologies Corporation (UTC) and the Raytheon Company. Before the merger, UTC spun off its Otis Elevator Company and Carrier Corporation subsidiaries. The merged company adopted the better-known name of Raytheon in the form Raytheon Technologies Corporation and transferred its headquarters to Waltham, Massachusetts. Former UTC CEO and chairman Gregory J. Hayes is chairman and CEO of the combined company, which was renamed from Raytheon Technologies Corporation to RTX in July 2023.

== History ==
=== 1922-2020: Raytheon ===
The Raytheon Company was founded in 1922 in Cambridge, Massachusetts, by Laurence K. Marshall, Vannevar Bush, and Charles G. Smith as the American Appliance Company. Its focus, which was originally on new refrigeration technology, soon shifted to electronics. The company's first product was a gaseous (helium) rectifier that was based on Charles Smith's earlier astronomical research of the star Zeta Puppis. The electron tube was christened with the name Raytheon ("light of/from the gods") and was used in a battery eliminator, a type of radio-receiver power supply that plugged into the power grid in place of large batteries. This made it possible to convert household alternating current to direct current for radios and thus eliminate the need for expensive, short-lived batteries.

In 1925, the company changed its name to Raytheon Manufacturing Company and began marketing its rectifier under the Raytheon brand name, with commercial success. In 1928, Raytheon merged with Q.R.S. Company, an American manufacturer of electron tubes and switches, to form the successor of the same name, Raytheon Manufacturing Company. By the 1930s, it had already grown to become one of the world's largest vacuum tube manufacturing companies. In 1933 it diversified by acquiring Acme-Delta Company, a producer of transformers, power equipment, and electronic auto parts.

During World War II, Raytheon mass-manufactured magnetron tubes for use in microwave radar sets and then complete radar systems. At war's end in 1945, the company was responsible for about 80 percent of all magnetrons manufactured. During the war, Raytheon also pioneered the production of shipboard radar systems, particularly for submarine detection. Raytheon ranked 71st among United States corporations in the value of World War II military production contracts. In 1945, Raytheon's Percy Spencer invented the microwave oven by discovering that the magnetron could rapidly heat food. In 1947, the company demonstrated the Radarange microwave oven for commercial use.

After the war, Raytheon developed the first guidance system for a missile that could intercept a flying target. In 1948, Raytheon began to manufacture guided missiles, including the SAM-N-2 Lark, and eventually the air-to-air AIM-7 Sparrow, and the ground-to-air MIM-23 Hawk missiles. In 1959, Raytheon acquired the marine electronics company Apelco Applied Electronics, which significantly increased its strength in commercial marine navigation and radio gear, and changed its name to Raytheon Company.

During the post-war years, Raytheon also made generally low- to medium-powered radio and television transmitters and related equipment for the commercial market. In the 1950s, Raytheon began manufacturing transistors, including the CK722, priced for and marketed to hobbyists. Under the direction of Thomas L. Phillips in 1965, it acquired Amana Refrigeration, Inc., a manufacturer of refrigerators and air conditioners. Using the Amana brand name and its distribution channels, Raytheon began selling the first countertop household microwave oven in 1967 and became a dominant manufacturer in the microwave oven business.

In 1991, during the Persian Gulf War, Raytheon's Patriot missile received great international exposure. It was credited for downing Iraqi Scud missiles. The exposure resulted in a substantial increase in sales for the company outside the United States. By 2006, Raytheon reported $283.9 million in global revenues for its Patriot missile system.

In an effort to establish leadership in the defense electronics business, Raytheon purchased in quick succession Dallas-based E-Systems (1995); Chrysler Corporation's defense electronics and aircraft-modification businesses, and the defense unit of Texas Instruments, Defense Systems & Electronics Group (1997). The businesses were purchased for $2.3 billion and $2.95 billion, respectively. Also in 1997, Raytheon acquired the aerospace and defense business of Hughes Aircraft Company from Hughes Electronics Corporation, a subsidiary of General Motors, which included a number of product lines previously purchased by Hughes Electronics, including the former General Dynamics missile business (Pomona facility), the defense portion of Delco Electronics (Delco Systems Operations), and Magnavox Electronic Systems. Raytheon also divested itself of several nondefense businesses in the 1990s, including Amana Refrigeration and Seismograph Service Ltd (sold to Schlumberger-Geco-Prakla).

In November 2007, Raytheon purchased robotics company Sarcos, and in October 2009, Raytheon acquired BBN Technologies. In December 2010, Applied Signal Technology agreed to be acquired by Raytheon for $490 million.

In October 2014, Raytheon beat rivals Lockheed Martin and Northrop Grumman for a contract to build 3DELRR, a next-generation long-range radar system, for the US Air Force worth an estimated $1 billion. The contract award involved the construction of next-generation radar that can track aircraft, missiles, and remotely piloted aircraft. It was immediately protested by Raytheon's competitors. After re-evaluating the bids following the protests, the US Air Force decided to delay awarding the 3DELRR EMD contract until 2017 and was to issue an amended solicitation at the end of July 2016. In 2017 the Air Force again awarded the contract to Raytheon.

In May 2015, Raytheon acquired cybersecurity firm Websense, Inc. from Vista Equity Partners for $1.9 billion and combined it with RCP, formerly part of its IIS segment to form Raytheon|Websense. In October 2015, Raytheon|Websense acquired Foreground Security, a provider of security operations centers, managed security service solutions and cybersecurity professional services, for $62 million. In January 2016, Raytheon|Websense acquired the firewall provider Stonesoft from Intel Security for an undisclosed amount and renamed itself to Forcepoint.

In July 2016, Poland's Defence Minister Antoni Macierewicz planned to sign a letter of intent with Raytheon for a $5.6 billion deal to upgrade its Patriot missile-defense shield, and in 2017, Saudi Arabia signed business deals worth billions of dollars with multiple American companies, including Raytheon.

In February 2020, Raytheon completed the first radar antenna array for the US Army's new missile defense radar, known as the Lower Tier Air and Missile Defense Sensor (LTAMDS), to replace the service's Patriot air and missile defense system sensor.

=== 1929-2020: United Technologies Corporation ===
In 1929, William Boeing's Boeing Airplane & Transport Corporation teamed up with Frederick Rentschler's Pratt & Whitney to form the United Aircraft and Transport Corporation, a large, vertically integrated, amalgamated firm, uniting business interests in all aspects of aviation—a combination of aircraft engine and airframe manufacturing and airline business, to serve all aviation markets, both civil aviation (cargo, passenger, private, air mail) and military aviation. After the Air Mail scandal of 1934, the U.S. government concluded that such large holding companies as United Aircraft and Transport were anti-competitive, and new antitrust laws were passed forbidding airframe or engine manufacturers from having interests in airlines.

United Aircraft Corporation was formed in 1934 from United Aircraft and Transport's manufacturing interests east of the Mississippi River (Pratt & Whitney, Sikorsky, Vought, and Hamilton Standard Propeller Company), headquartered in Hartford with Frederick Rentschler, founder of Pratt & Whitney, as president.

United Aircraft became a component of the Dow Jones Industrial Average on March 4, 1939, when United Aircraft and AT&T were added to replace Nash Motors and International Business Machines. The company and its successors remained a component of the Dow Jones Industrial Average through August 2020. It was announced that starting August 31, 2020, Raytheon Technologies would be substituted in the Dow Jones Industrial Average by Honeywell International.

During World War II, United Aircraft ranked sixth among United States corporations in the value of wartime production contracts. At the close of the war, United Aircraft entered the emerging markets for jet engines and helicopters, via Pratt & Whitney and Sikorsky, respectively.

In the 1950s, United Aircraft began developing jet engines, including the Pratt & Whitney J57, the most powerful jet engine on the market for some years. In the 1960s, Pratt & Whitney produced the Pratt & Whitney JT9D for the Boeing 747.

In 1974, Harry Jack Gray left Litton Industries to become the CEO of United Aircraft. He pursued a strategy of growth and diversification, changing the parent corporation's name to United Technologies Corporation (UTC) in 1975 to reflect the intent to diversify into numerous high tech fields beyond aerospace. (The change became official on May 1, 1975.) The diversification was partially to balance civilian business against any overreliance on military business. UTC became a mergers and acquisitions (M&A)–focused organization, with various forced takeovers of unwilling smaller corporations. The next year (1976), UTC forcibly acquired Otis Elevator. In 1979, Carrier Refrigeration was acquired;

At one point the military portion of UTC's business, whose sensitivity to "excess profits" and boom/bust demand drove UTC to diversify away from it, actually carried the weight of losses incurred by the commercial M&A side of the business. Although M&A activity was not new to United Aircraft, the M&A activity of the 1970s and 1980s was higher-stakes and arguably unfocused. Rather than aviation being the central theme of UTC businesses, high tech (of any type) was the new theme. Some Wall Street watchers questioned the true value of M&A at almost any price, seemingly for its own sake.

In 1999, UTC acquired Sundstrand Corporation and merged it into UTC's Hamilton Standard unit to form Hamilton Sundstrand. In 2003, UTC entered the fire and security business by purchasing Chubb Security. In 2004, UTC acquired the Schweizer Aircraft Corporation which planned to operate as a wholly owned subsidiary under their Sikorsky Aircraft division.

In 2005, UTC further pursued its stake in the fire and security business by purchasing Kidde. Also in 2005, UTC acquired Boeing's Rocketdyne division, which was merged into the Pratt & Whitney business unit and renamed Pratt & Whitney Rocketdyne (later sold to Aerojet and merged into Aerojet Rocketdyne). In November 2008, UTC's Carrier Corporation acquired NORESCO, an energy service company.

In 2010, UTC conducted its largest acquisition to date, General Electric's security equipment business for US$1.8 billion, a move to support UTC's Fire & Security unit. In September 2011, UTC acquired an $18.4 billion deal (including $1.9 billion in net debt assumed) for aircraft components maker Goodrich Corporation. In July 2012, United Technologies acquired Goodrich and merged it with Hamilton Sundstrand, forming UTC Aerospace Systems.

In November 2018, UTC acquired Rockwell Collins for $23 billion ($30 billion including Rockwell Collins' net debt). As part of the deal, Pratt and Whitney and the newly-formed Collins Aerospace remained under United Technologies, while Otis Elevator and UTC Climate, Controls & Security (doing business as Carrier) were spun off as two independent companies. The spin off was completed in March 2020.

=== 2020-2023: Raytheon Technologies ===
Raytheon Technologies logo used from 2020 to 2023

In June 2019, United Technologies announced the intention to merge with the Raytheon Company. The combined company, valued at more than $100 billion after planned spinoffs, would be the world's second-largest aerospace-and-defense company by sales behind Boeing. Although UTC was the legal survivor, the merged company took the name Raytheon Technologies and based its headquarters at Raytheon's former campus in Waltham, Massachusetts, rather than UTC's former base in Farmington, Connecticut. The merger was completed in April 2020. Raytheon Technologies began trading at $51 per share, on the New York Stock Exchange under the ticker RTX.

On July 28, 2020, the company announced cutting of over 8,000 jobs in its commercial aviation division due to travel slowdown induced by the global COVID-19 pandemic. In December 2020, the Board of Directors authorized a $5 billion repurchase of common stock.

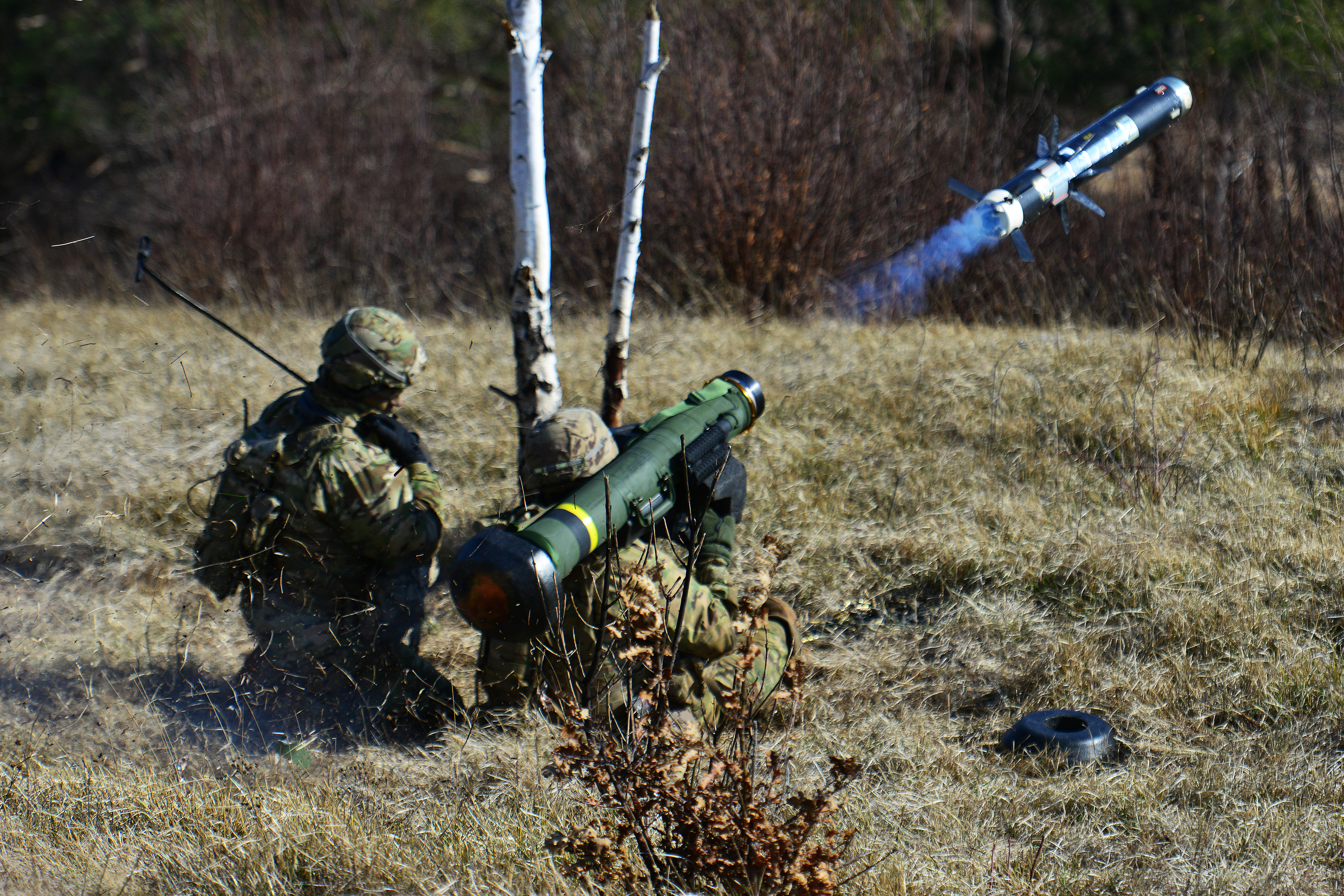
A U.S. soldier firing a Javelin

In 2022, during the Russian invasion of Ukraine, major arms manufacturers, including Raytheon Technologies, reported a sharp increase in interim sales and profits. On June 7, 2022, the company announced plans to move its global headquarters to Arlington, Virginia. The move was completed in July.

In January 2023, Raytheon Technologies announced it would combine its missiles and defense division and intelligence and space division into a single business unit, effective July 1. The reorganization created three divisions at Raytheon Technologies: Collins Aerospace, Pratt & Whitney, and Raytheon. The reorganization was preceded by the rebranding to RTX in June 2023.

=== 2023-today: RTX ===
In July 2023, Raytheon Technologies Corporation changed its name to RTX Corporation. Also in July 2023, RTX announced that it was selling its actuation and flight control business, part of Collins Aerospace, to Safran for a consideration of $1.8 billion. However, the Italian government used its golden share in Microtecnica to veto the sale in the belief it would give Safran the commercial ability to sabotage Eurofighter components production. RTX legally challenged the use of the veto. The deal eventually successfully closed in July 2025. In December 2023, RTX announced that CEO Greg Hayes would step down the following May and be replaced by company president Christopher T. Calio.

== Controversies and legal issues ==
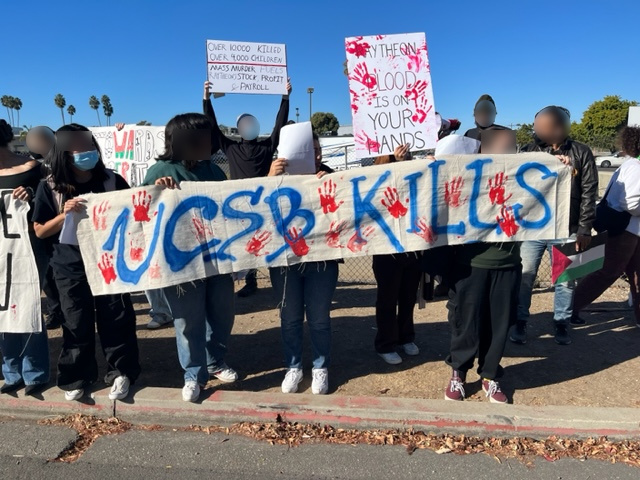
Protesters in Goleta, California, gathered outside the RTX office on November 9, 2023, to protest arms shipments to Israel.

RTX's supply of weapons to Israel led to protests against the company during the Gaza war and genocide. On December 14, 2023, for example, protestors blocked the entrance to an RTX facility in Arizona. In early 2024, 15 people were arrested after blocking access to RTX and BAE Systems facilities in Louisville, Kentucky in protest against supplying weapons to Israel. Economist Clara Mattei writes that, from October 2023 to July 2025, their stock price increased by 77 percent.

In August 2024, RTX was fined US$200 million for International Traffic in Arms Regulations violations, including exchanging data and products with prohibited countries such as China.

RTX Corporation has agreed to pay over $950 million to resolve multiple federal investigations involving bribery, government contracting violations, and export control breaches. The settlement, announced on October 16, 2024, includes penalties for bribing a Qatari official with ties to the country's royal family and defrauding the U.S. Defense Department in procurement contracts. According to the SEC's order, Raytheon used sham subcontracts with a supplier to pay bribes of nearly $2 million to Qatari military and other officials to obtain defense contracts. Additionally, for almost two decades until 2020, Raytheon paid more than $30 million to a Qatari agent related to the Qatari Emir, despite the agent lacking a background in defense contracting.

The second agreement, made with DOJ officials in Boston, involves RTX paying $574 million to settle allegations of overcharging in federal contracts. This includes schemes to defraud the U.S. Department of Defense in connection with the provision of defense products and services, such as Patriot missile systems and radar systems intended for an undisclosed foreign customer. As part of the settlement, RTX will also pay a $124 million penalty to the Securities and Exchange Commission. The company has acknowledged responsibility for the misconduct, which largely occurred prior to 2020, and has stated that it is working on remediation efforts.

== Business units ==
After the 2020 merger, Raytheon Technologies Corporation consisted of four business units:

- Pratt & Whitney: Designs and builds aircraft engines and gas turbines.
  - Pratt & Whitney Canada
- Collins Aerospace: Designs and manufactures aerospace systems for commercial, regional, corporate and military aircraft; a major supplier for international space programs. Provides industrial products for the hydrocarbon, chemical, and food processing industries, construction and mining companies. Collins Aerospace was formed following UTC's acquisition of Rockwell Collins in 2018 and combining that business with UTC Aerospace Systems, which itself was the result of a 2012 merger of Hamilton Sundstrand and the Goodrich Corporation.
- Raytheon Intelligence & Space (RIS): Formerly Raytheon Intelligence, Information and Services (IIS) and Raytheon Space and Airborne Systems (SAS)
- Raytheon Missiles & Defense (RMD): Formerly Raytheon Integrated Defense Systems (IDS) and Raytheon Missile Systems (RMS)

In 2023, the company changed its name to RTX Corporation and re-organized into three business units:

- Pratt & Whitney
  - Pratt & Whitney Canada
- Collins Aerospace: Includes multi-domain command-and-control and air traffic management product lines that were formerly Raytheon Intelligence & Space (RIS) and Raytheon Missiles & Defense (RMD)
- Raytheon: Includes government-facing businesses from RIS and RMD, as well as the ISR (Intelligence, surveillance and reconnaissance) business from Collins Aerospace
