= Raytheon Intelligence & Space =

American defense contractor

- Company type: Subsidiary
- Industry: Defense Contracting
- Predecessor: Raytheon Intelligence, Information and Services; Raytheon Space and Airborne Systems
- Founded: April 3, 2020; 6 years ago
- Defunct: July 1, 2023; 2 years ago
- Successor: Raytheon
- Headquarters: Arlington County, Virginia, United States
- Key people: Roy Azevedo (president)
- Number of employees: 39,000 (2020)
- Parent: RTX Corporation
- Subsidiaries: Raytheon UK; Raytheon Australia
- Website: raytheonintelligenceandspace.com

Raytheon Intelligence & Space (RIS) was one of the four business segments of U.S. defense and aerospace conglomerate RTX Corporation. Headquartered in Arlington, Virginia, RIS has a total employment of 39,000 and 2019 sales of US$15 billion. Roy Azevedo is the segment's president.

Raytheon Intelligence & Space is the result of a merger between two former Raytheon Company businesses: Raytheon Intelligence, Information and Services (IIS) and Raytheon Space and Airborne Systems (SAS). The merger was finalized on the day that Raytheon Technologies was formed, on 3 April 2020.

Raytheon Technologies completed its acquisition of satellite manufacturer Blue Canyon Technologies of Boulder, Colorado on 22 December 2020.

Raytheon Intelligence & Space was merged with Raytheon Missiles & Defense in July 2023 to form the Raytheon business segment.
