= Christopher T. Calio =

American businessman

Christopher T. Calio is an American businessman, and the chairman and chief executive officer (CEO) of RTX Corporation.

Calio graduated from South Windsor High School, Connecticut in 1992. He earned a bachelor's degree in political science from Trinity College, Connecticut, and a juris doctor and MBA from the University of Connecticut.

Calio became a director of RTX in 2023, and president and CEO in May 2024. He additionally became chairman in April 2025.

Calio is married to Caroline, and they have two sons.
