= Percy Spencer =

American electrical engineer and inventor of the microwave oven (1894–1970)

- Born: Percy Spencer; July 19, 1894; Howland, Maine, U.S.
- Died: September 8, 1970 (aged 76); Newton, Massachusetts, U.S.
- Resting place: Newton Cemetery, Newton, Massachusetts
- Education: United States Navy
- Occupations: Physicist; inventor; electrical Engineer
- Employer: Raytheon
- Known for: Inventor of microwave oven
- Spouses: Louise Spencer; Lillian Ottenheimer Spencer
- Children: 3

Percy LaBaron Spencer (July 19, 1894, Howland, Maine, U.S – September 8, 1970, Newton, Massachusetts, U.S.) was an American physicist, electrical engineer, and inventor of the microwave oven. As a boy he was twice orphaned and began work at a young age, never finishing grammar school. During the night shift, he taught himself topics such as calculus, trigonometry, physics, and chemistry, establishing a lifelong habit of self-education or "solving my own situation" as he called it.

Spencer led the power tube division at Raytheon during World War II that expanded massively and continued at the company as an executive and senior member of the board. Even among physicists and top researchers, he was famous for his insatiable knowledge absorption.

== Early life ==
Spencer was born July 19, 1894 in Howland, Maine and orphaned at a young age. His father died when he was 18 months old, and his mother was unable to care for him so he lived with his aunt and uncle. When Spencer was seven years old, his uncle died. He left grammar school to earn money to support himself and his aunt. From the ages of 12 to 16, he worked from sunrise to sunset at a spool mill before achieving a job installing electricity at a local paper mill despite never having received any formal training in electrical engineering or even finishing grammar school. Prior to his hiring, Spencer had heard the paper mill would soon install electricity and quickly learned as much as possible about electricity. At that time, 1910, it was little known in his rural home region.

At the age of 18, Spencer joined the U.S. Navy to gain experience in Wireless communications, a subject he had been interested in since reading of the wireless operators aboard the Titanic. In the Navy he made himself an expert on radio technology: "I just got hold of a lot of textbooks and taught myself while I was standing watch at night." He also subsequently taught himself trigonometry, calculus, chemistry, physics, and metallurgy.

== Career ==
An early water-cooled Raytheon RadaRange in the galley of the NS Savannah

By 1939, Spencer was one of the world's leading experts in radar tube design. He was appointed chief of the power tube division at Raytheon, a U.S. Department of Defense contractor, and his division grew from 15 to more than 1000 staff. Spencer developed a more efficient way to manufacture magnetrons. His improved Magnetron design replaced precision copper bars with lamina and soldered internal wires with a simple solid ring. These changes simplified the manufacturing process and helped Raytheon produce magnetrons much faster, increasing production from 100 to 2600 magnetrons per day. With his reputation and expertise, Spencer helped Raytheon win a government contract to develop and produce combat radar equipment for M.I.T.’s Radiation Laboratory. This was of huge importance to the Allies of World War II and became the military's second-highest priority project during World War II, behind the Manhattan Project. For his work, he was awarded the Distinguished Public Service Award by the U.S. Navy. Spencer originally joined the American Appliance Company in 1925, which later became Raytheon. He spent 39 years working for the company before retiring in 1964.

According to legend, one day while building magnetrons, Spencer was standing in front of an active radar set when he noticed the candy bar he had in his pocket melted. Spencer was not the first to notice this phenomenon, but he was the first to investigate it. He decided to experiment using food, including popcorn kernels, which became the world's first microwaved popcorn. In another experiment, an egg was placed in a tea kettle, and the magnetron was placed directly above it. The result was the egg exploding in the face of one of his co-workers, who was looking in the kettle to observe. Spencer then created the first true microwave oven by attaching a high-density electromagnetic field generator to an enclosed metal box. The magnetron emitted microwaves into the metal box blocking any escape and allowing for controlled and safe experimentation. He then placed various food items in the box, while observing the effects and monitoring temperatures.

Raytheon filed a U.S. Patent application on October 8, 1945, for a microwave cooking oven. In 1947, the first commercially produced microwave oven was about 6 feet tall, weighed about 750 lbs, and cost about $5,000 (equivalent to $72,094 in 2025). The first commercial microwave ovens were initially intended for restaurants and other commercial foods services rather than ordinary household. In 1967 the first more affordable, $495 (equivalent to $4,780 in 2025), and reasonably sized (counter-top) Radarange brand microwave oven was made available for sale, produced by Amana (a division of Raytheon).

Spencer became Senior Vice President and a Senior Member of the Board of Directors at Raytheon. He received 300 patents during his career. Originally, a Raytheon facility in Burlington, Massachusetts involved in vacuum tube development and manufacturing was named Spencer Labs after Spencer. This facility was eventually closed. Later, a new building at the Raytheon Missile Defense Center in Woburn, Massachusetts, was named in his honor. Other achievements and awards, besides the Distinguished Public Service Award, included membership of the Institute of Radio Engineers, Fellowship in the American Academy of Arts and Sciences, and an Honorary Doctor of Science from the University of Massachusetts, despite having no formal education.

For his invention, Spencer received no royalties, but he was paid a one-time $2.00 gratuity from Raytheon, the same token payment the company made to all inventors on its payroll at that time for company patents.

== Personal life ==
Spencer and his first wife, Louise, had three children: John, James, and George. Later, he married Lillian Ottenheimer on November 18, 1960. He died in Newton, Massachusetts in late 1970 at age 76.

His friends included Omar Bradley, William Redington Hewlett, David Packard, and Vannevar Bush, who said "every physicist in the country" respected Spencer for not only his ingenuity but "what he has learned about physics by absorbing it through his skin."

== Legacy ==
Raytheon Integrated Defense Systems, which deals extensively in radar systems, named a building after Spencer in the Woburn, Massachusetts facility. An early Radarange model sits in the lobby, across from the dining center.
