= Raytheon =

U.S. defense contractor

Coordinates: 42°24′20″N 71°16′58″W

Raytheon Company

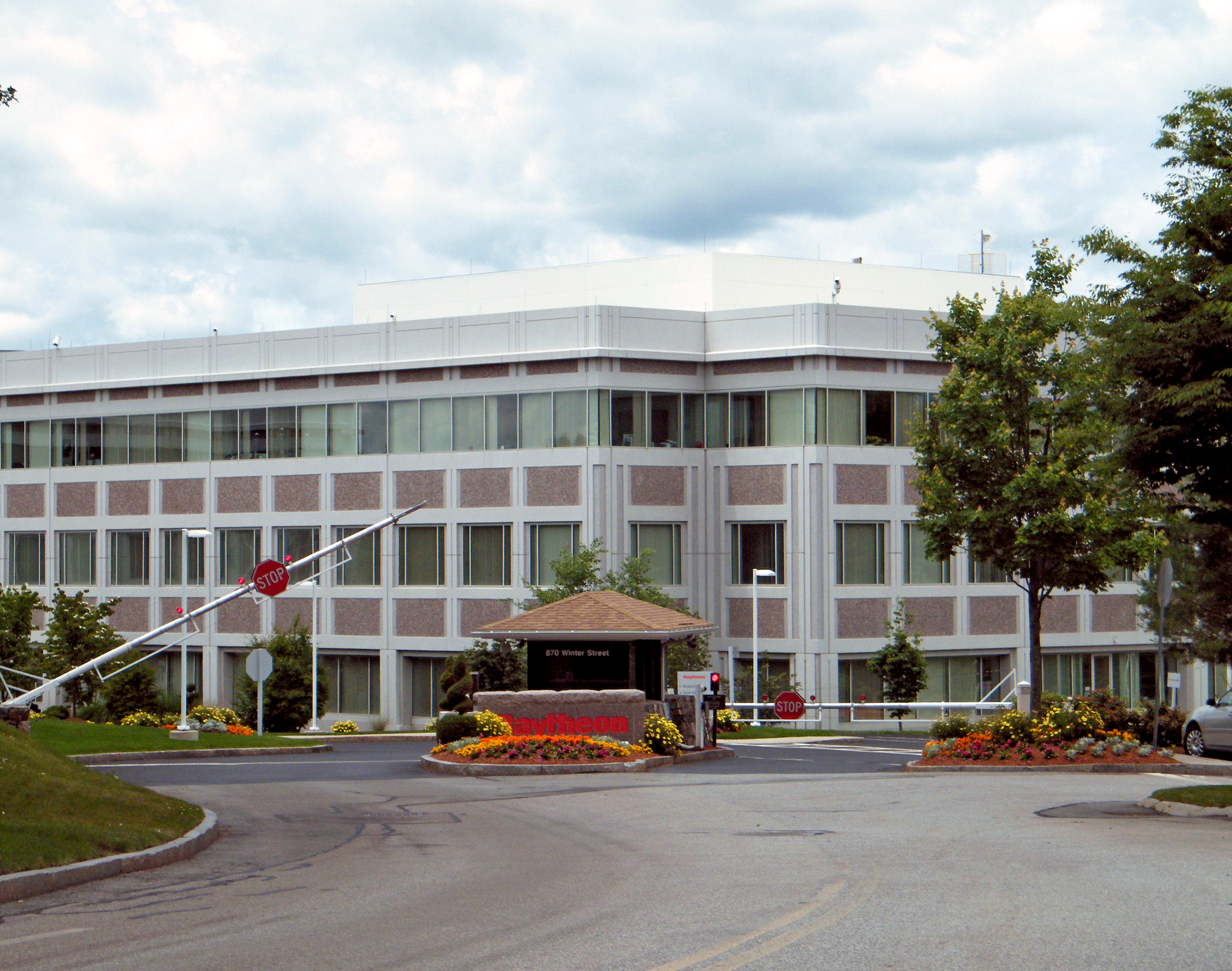
- Raytheon's former headquarters complex in Waltham, Massachusetts
- Type: Public company
- Traded as: NYSE: RTX
- Industry: Aerospace and defense
- Founded: July 7, 1922; 104 years ago, in Cambridge, Massachusetts, U.S.
- Founder: Vannevar Bush; Laurence K. Marshall; Charles G. Smith
- Defunct: 3 April 2020
- Fate: Merged with United Technologies
- Successor: RTX Corporation
- Headquarters: Waltham, Massachusetts, U.S.
- Area served: Worldwide
- Key people: Phil Jasper (chairman and CEO)
- Revenue: US$29.18 billion (2019)
- Net income: US$3.34 billion (2019)
- Number of employees: ~67,000 (2018)
- Website: www.rtx.com/raytheon

Raytheon is a business unit of RTX Corporation and is a major U.S. defense contractor and industrial corporation with manufacturing concentrations in weapons, military, and commercial electronics. Raytheon was founded in 1922 and in 2020 it merged with United Technologies Corporation to form Raytheon Technologies, which changed its name to RTX Corporation in July 2023.

Raytheon was established in 1922, reincorporated in 1928, and adopted the Raytheon Company name in 1959. More than 90% of Raytheon's revenues were obtained from military contracts and by 2012, it was the fifth-largest military contractor in the world. In 2015, it had become the third-largest defense contractor in the United States, by defense revenue. It was the world's largest producer of guided missiles, and was involved in corporate and special-mission aircraft until early 2007. As of 2018, the company had 67,000 employees and annual revenues of about US$ 25.35 billion.

Raytheon has moved its headquarters among various Massachusetts locations: Cambridge from 1922 to 1928; Newton until 1941; Waltham until 1961; Lexington until 2003; and then Waltham again through the present day.

== History ==
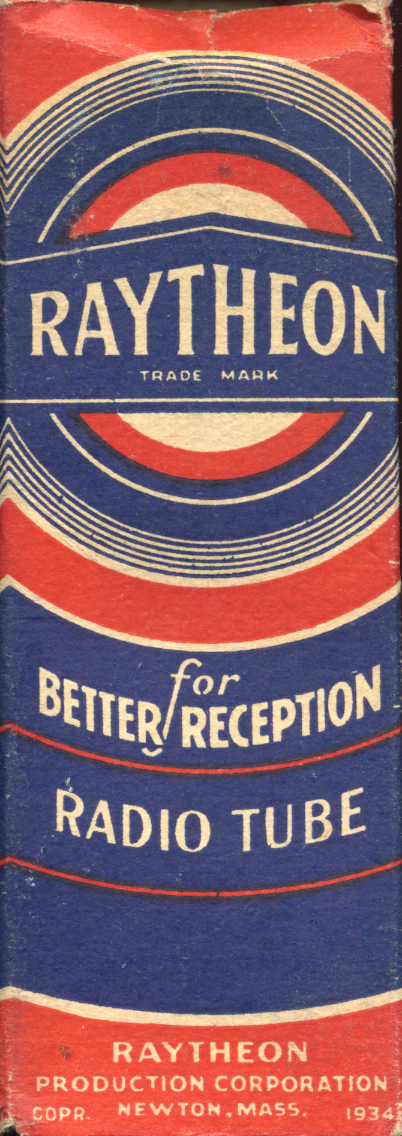
An early Raytheon tube box

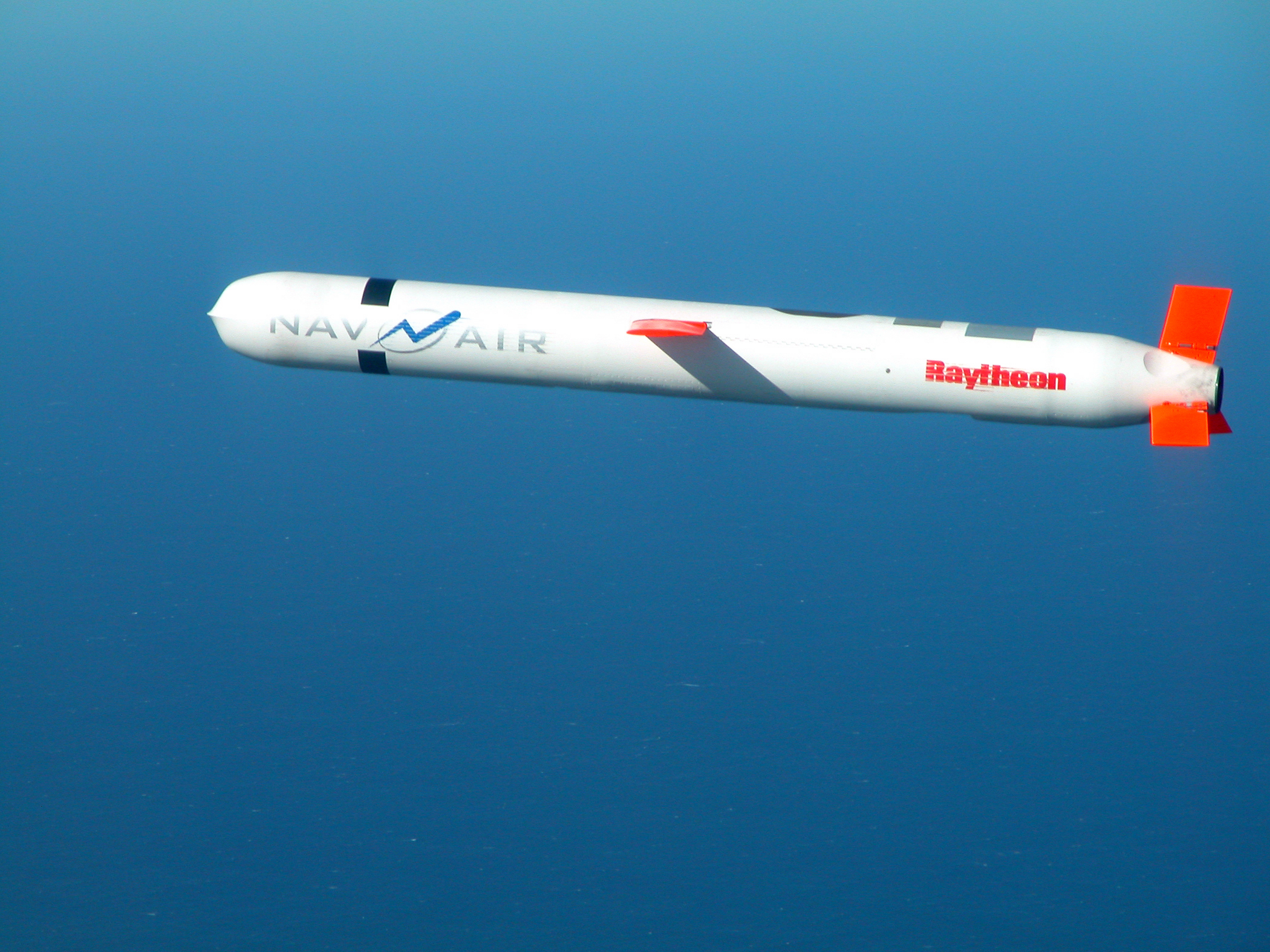
A Raytheon Tomahawk Block IV cruise missile during a U.S. Navy flight test at NAWS China Lake, California (November 10, 2002)

=== Early years ===
In 1922, Vannevar Bush, scientist and professor in the Department of Electrical Engineering at the Massachusetts Institute of Technology (MIT), along with engineer and physicist Laurence K. Marshall, and scientist Charles G. Smith, founded the American Appliance Company in Cambridge, Massachusetts. Its focus, which was originally on new refrigeration technology, soon shifted to electronics. The company's first product was a gaseous (helium) voltage-regulator tube that was based on Charles Smith's earlier astronomical research of the star Zeta Puppis. The electron tube was named Raytheon (a compound of Old French and Greek meaning 'light from the gods') and was used in a battery eliminator, a type of radio-receiver power supply that plugged into the power grid in place of large batteries. This made it possible to convert household alternating current to a regulated, high voltage direct current for radios and thus eliminate the need for expensive, short-lived batteries.

In 1925, the company changed its name to Raytheon Manufacturing Company and began marketing its rectifier, under the Raytheon brand name, with commercial success. In 1928 Raytheon merged with Q.R.S. Company, an American manufacturer of electron tubes and switches, to form the successor of the same name, Raytheon Manufacturing Company. By the 1930s, it had already grown to become one of the world's largest vacuum tube manufacturing companies. In 1933 it diversified by acquiring Acme-Delta Company, a producer of transformers, power equipment, and electronic auto parts.

=== During World War II ===
Early in World War II, physicists in the United Kingdom invented the magnetron, a specialized microwave-generating electron tube that markedly improved the capability of radar to detect enemy aircraft. American companies were then sought by the US government to perfect and mass-produce the magnetron for ground-based, airborne, and shipborne radar systems, and, with support from the Massachusetts Institute of Technology's Radiation Laboratory (recently formed to investigate microwave radar), Raytheon received a contract to build the devices. Within a few months, Raytheon began to manufacture magnetron tubes for use in radar sets, and then complete radar systems. During the war, Raytheon also pioneered the production of shipboard radar systems, particularly for submarine detection. Raytheon was also a contractor for the mass-production of miniature shock-resistant vacuum tubes used in proximity fuses. These tubes were difficult to manufacture and required rigorous attention to detail. At war's end in 1945, the company had built about 80 percent of all magnetrons. Raytheon ranked 71st among U.S. corporations in the value of World War II military production contracts.

In 1945, Raytheon's Percy Spencer invented the microwave oven by discovering that the magnetron could rapidly heat food. In 1947, the company demonstrated the Radarange microwave oven for commercial use.

=== After World War II ===
During the post-war years, Raytheon also made generally low- to medium-powered radio and television transmitters and related equipment for the commercial market, but the high-powered market was solidly in the hands of larger, better-financed competitors such as Continental Electronics, General Electric and Radio Corporation of America.

In 1946, the company expanded its electronics capability through acquisitions that included the Submarine Signal Company (founded in 1901), a leading manufacturer of maritime safety equipment. With its broadened capabilities, Raytheon developed the first guidance system for a missile that could intercept a flying target. In 1948, Charles Francis Adams IV was appointed president of the company and served until 1960. In 1948, Raytheon began to manufacture guided missiles. In 1950, its Lark became the first such missile to destroy a target aircraft in flight. Raytheon then received military contracts to develop the air-to-air Sparrow and ground-to-air Hawk missiles, projects that received impetus from the Korean War. In later decades, it remained a major producer of missiles, such as the Patriot antimissile missile and the air-to-air Phoenix missile.

Raytheon made a foray into computers, producing the RAYDAC computer for the U.S. Navy which became operational in 1953. "Unfortunately, the machine was technically obsolete by the time it was operational." Also in 1953, the company began work on a follow-on, the RAYCOM, which was never completed. In 1954, it entered into a joint venture with Honeywell to form the Datamatic corporation. However it sold its interest to Honeywell a year later, before introduction of the DATAmatic 1000 system.

In 1958, Raytheon acquired the marine electronics company Applied Electronics Company to make commercial marine navigation and radio gear, as well as less-expensive Japanese suppliers of products such as marine/weather band radios and direction-finding gear. In the same year, it changed its name to Raytheon Company.

In the 1950s, Raytheon began manufacturing transistors, including the CK722, priced and marketed to hobbyists.

In 1961, the British electronics company A.C. Cossor merged with Raytheon, following its sale by Philips. The new company's name was Raytheon Cossor. The Cossor side of the organisation was still in the Raytheon group in 2010.

In 1965, it acquired Amana Refrigeration, Inc., a manufacturer of refrigerators and air conditioners. Using the Amana brand name and its distribution channels, Raytheon began selling the first countertop household microwave oven in 1967 and became a dominant manufacturer in the microwave oven business.

In 1966, the company entered the educational publishing business with the acquisition of D.C. Heath and Company, marketing an influential physics textbook developed by the Physical Science Study Committee. Raytheon also manufactured the Apollo Guidance Computer, which was introduced that year and flew aboard all NASA Project Apollo missions.

In the late 1970s, Raytheon acquired McGraw-Edison's appliances division notable for the Speed Queen line of washers and dryers.

=== 1980s ===
In 1980, Raytheon acquired Beech Aircraft Corporation, a leading manufacturer of general aviation aircraft founded in 1932 by Walter H. Beech. In 1993, the company expanded its aircraft activities by adding the Hawker line of business jets by acquiring Corporate Jets Inc., the business jet product line of British Aerospace (now BAE Systems). These two entities were merged in 1994 to become the Raytheon Aircraft Company. In the first quarter of 2007 Raytheon sold its aircraft operations, which subsequently operated as Hawker Beechcraft, and since 2014 have been units of Textron Aviation. The product line of Raytheon's aircraft subsidiary included business jets such as the Hawker 800XP and Hawker 4000, the Beechjet 400A, and the Premier I; the popular King Air series of twin turboprops; and piston-engine aircraft such as the Bonanza. Its special-mission aircraft included the single-turboprop T-6A Texan II, which the United States Air Force and United States Navy had chosen as their primary training aircraft.

=== 1990s ===
In 1991, during the Persian Gulf War, Raytheon's Patriot missile received great international exposure, resulting in a substantial increase in sales for the company outside the United States. In an effort to establish leadership in the defense electronics business, Raytheon purchased in quick succession Dallas-based E-Systems (1995); Chrysler Corporation's defense electronics and aircraft-modification businesses, which had previously acquired companies such as Electrospace systems (1996) (portions of these businesses were later sold to L-3 Communications), and the defense unit of Texas Instruments, Defense Systems & Electronics Group (1997). Also in 1997, Raytheon acquired the aerospace and defense business of Hughes Aircraft Company from Hughes Electronics Corporation, a subsidiary of General Motors, which included a number of product lines previously purchased by Hughes Electronics, including the former General Dynamics missile business (Pomona facility), the defense portion of Delco Electronics (Delco Systems Operations), and Magnavox Electronic Systems.

Raytheon also divested itself of several nondefense businesses in the 1990s, including Amana Refrigeration, Raytheon Commercial Laundry (purchased by Bain Capital's Alliance Laundry Systems), and Seismograph Service Ltd (sold to Schlumberger-Geco-Prakla). On October 12, 1999, Raytheon exited the personal rapid transit (PRT) business as it terminated its PRT 2000 system due to the high cost of development and the lack of interest.

=== 2000s ===
During the September 11 attacks of 2001, Raytheon had an office in the South Tower of the World Trade Center on the 91st floor. Their office, being 6 floors above where United Airlines Flight 175 collided with the building, was spared from the immediate collision, but was destroyed in the subsequent collapse of the South Tower.

In November 2007, Raytheon purchased Sarcos for an undisclosed sum, seeking to expand into robotics research and production.

In September 2009, Raytheon purchased Cambridge-based Bolt Beranek and Newman Inc. as a wholly owned subsidiary for about $350 million.

=== 2010s ===
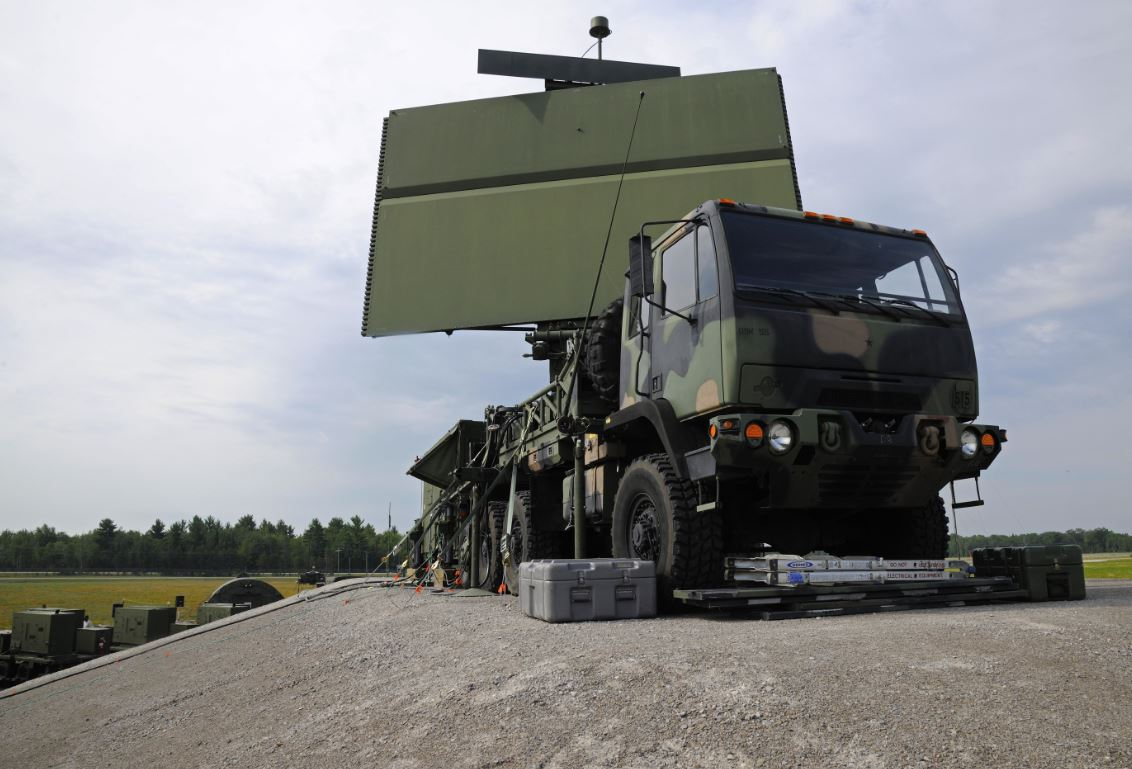
The 3DELRR long-range radar system in 2021

In December 2010, Sunnyvale-based Applied Signal Technology agreed to be acquired by Raytheon for $490 million.

In October 2014, Raytheon beat rivals Lockheed Martin and Northrop Grumman for a contract to build 3DELRR, a next-generation long-range radar system, for the USAF worth an estimated $1 billion.

The contract award was immediately protested by Raytheon's competitors, Lockheed Martin and Northrop Grumman. After re-evaluating the bids following the protests, the USAF decided to delay awarding the 3DELRR EMD contract until 2017 and was to issue an amended solicitation at the end of July 2016. In 2017 the USAF again awarded the contract to Raytheon.

In May 2015, Raytheon acquired Austin-based cybersecurity firm Websense, Inc. from Vista Equity Partners for $1.9 billion and combined it with RCP, formerly part of its IIS segment to form Raytheon|Websense. In October 2015, Raytheon|Websense acquired Foreground Security for $62 million. In January 2016, Raytheon|Websense acquired the firewall provider Stonesoft from Intel Security for an undisclosed amount and renamed itself to Forcepoint.

In July 2016, Poland's Defence Minister Antoni Macierewicz planned to sign a letter of intent with Raytheon for a $5.6 billion deal to upgrade its Patriot missile-defence shield.

In 2017, Saudi Arabia signed business deals worth billions of dollars with multiple American companies, including Raytheon.

In July 2019, Qatar's Ministry of Defense committed to acquire Raytheon's NASAM and Patriot missile defense systems. The company would later be fined for paying bribes to a Qatari officials to influence defense purchases.

=== 2020s ===
In February 2020, Raytheon completed the first radar antenna array for the US Army's new missile defense radar, known as the Lower Tier Air and Missile Defense Sensor (LTAMDS), to replace the service's Patriot air and missile defense system sensor.

In April 2020, the company merged with United Technologies Corporation to form Raytheon Technologies in a $135 billion deal. The merged company is headquartered in Arlington, Virginia rather than UTC's base in Farmington, Connecticut.

Raytheon was sanctioned by the Chinese government in October 2020, and February 2023 due to arm sales to Taiwan.

In July 2023, Raytheon Technologies renamed themselves to RTX Corporation and merged the Raytheon Intelligence & Space and Raytheon Missiles & Defense business segments to form a new Raytheon business segment.

In August 2024, RTX agreed to pay a $200 million fine for the unauthorized export of defense technology to China, Russia, Iran, and elsewhere, to settle more than 750 violations of the Arms Export Control Act and the International Traffic in Arms Regulations, or ITAR. The company was allowed to pay only half the fine to the government and to put half of the fine toward "remedial compliance measures to strengthen RTX's compliance program." In October 2024, RTX agreed to pay nearly $1 billion to settle allegations of defrauding the U.S. Defense Department and bribing a Qatari military official. Company officials said the misconduct mostly occurred before 2020 and pledged to improve its compliance programs.

== Finances ==
For the fiscal year 2017, Raytheon reported earnings of US$2.024 billion, with an annual revenue of US$25.348 billion, an increase of 5.1% over the previous fiscal cycle. Raytheon's shares traded at over $164 per share, and its market capitalization was valued at over US$51.7 billion in November 2018.

Year	Revenue in mil. US$	Net income in mil. US$	Total assets in mil. US$	Price per share in US$	Employees
2005	18,491	871	24,381	27.58	
2006	19,707	1,283	25,491	33.92	
2007	21,301	2,578	23,281	42.79	
2008	23,174	1,672	23,134	44.40	
2009	24,881	1,935	23,607	35.95	
2010	25,150	1,840	24,422	40.55	
2011	24,791	1,866	25,854	38.75	
2012	24,414	1,888	26,686	46.38	
2013	23,706	1,996	25,967	61.96	63,000
2014	22,826	2,244	27,716	89.54	61,000
2015	23,321	2,110	29,281	102.58	61,000
2016	24,124	2,244	30,238	128.50	63,000
2017	25,348	2,024	30,860	164.75	64,000

== Company structure ==
=== Businesses ===
Raytheon is composed of five major business divisions:

- Integrated Defense Systems—based in Tewksbury, Massachusetts; Ralph Acaba, President
- Intelligence, Information and Services—based in Dulles, Virginia; Dave Wajsgras, President
- Missile Systems—based in Tucson, Arizona; Wesley Kremer, President
- Space and Airborne Systems—based in McKinney, Texas; Roy Azevedo, President
- Forcepoint—based Austin, Texas; CEO, Matt Moynahan

Raytheon's businesses are supported by several dedicated international operations including: Raytheon Australia; Raytheon Canada Limited; operations in Japan; Raytheon Microelectronics in Spain; Raytheon UK (formerly Raytheon Systems Limited); and ThalesRaytheonSystems, France.

==== Strategic Business Areas ====
In recent years, Raytheon has expanded into other fields while redefining some of its core business activities. Raytheon has identified five key 'Strategic Business Areas' where it is focusing its expertise and resources:

- Homeland Security
- Missile Defense
- Precision Engagement
- Intelligence, Surveillance, Reconnaissance (ISR)
- Process Improvement (Raytheon Lean6)

=== Leadership ===
In March 2014, Thomas Kennedy was named CEO of Raytheon Company. Kennedy succeeded William H. Swanson, who was CEO since 2003. Swanson remained as Chairman through September 2014 when Kennedy became chairman as well as CEO. Other current and former members of the board of directors of Raytheon were: Vernon Clark, James E. Cartwright, John Deutch, Stephen J. Hadley, George R. Oliver, Frederic Poses, Michael Ruettgers, Ronald Skates, William Spivey, and Linda Stuntz.

=== Ownership ===
As of December 2014, according to filed reports, the top ten institutional shareholders of Raytheon are Wellington Management Company, Vanguard Group, State Street Corporation, Barrow, Hanley, Mewhinney & Strauss, BlackRock Institutional Trust Company, BlackRock Advisors, Bank of America, Bank of New York Mellon, Deutsche Bank and Macquarie Group.

== Products and services ==
=== Overview ===
Raytheon provides electronics, mission systems integration and other capabilities in the areas of sensing; effects; and command, control, communications and intelligence systems; as well as a broad range of mission support services.

Raytheon's electronics and defense-systems units produce air-, sea-, and land-launched missiles, aircraft radar systems, weapons sights and targeting systems, communication and battle-management systems, and satellite components.

=== Air traffic control systems ===
- FIRSTplus Air Traffic Control Simulator
- AutoTrac III ATM System
- STARS

=== Radars and sensors ===
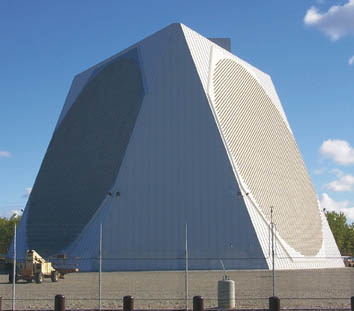
A PAVE PAWS Early Warning Radar System built by Raytheon, based at Clear AFS, Alaska

Raytheon is a developer and manufacturer of radars (including AESAs), electro-optical sensors, and other advanced electronics systems for airborne, naval and ground based military applications. Examples include:

- APG-63/APG-70 radars for the F-15 Eagle
- APG-65/APG-73/APG-79 radars for the F/A-18 Hornet
- APG-77 radar for the F-22 Raptor (joint development with Northrop Grumman)
- APG-84 RACR radar
- ALE-50 towed decoy
- ALR-67(V)3 and ALR-69A radar warning receivers
- AN/APQ-181 (AESA upgrade currently in development), for the B-2 Spirit bomber
- Integrated Sensor Suite (ISS) for the RQ-4 Global Hawk UAV
- ASQ-228 ATFLIR (Advanced Targeting Forward-Looking Infrared) pod
- TPQ-36/TPQ-37 Firefinder and MPQ-64 Sentinel mobile battlefield radars
- F-16 RACR, designed for the F-16 using AESA technology
- SLQ-32 shipboard EW system
- Large fixed-site radars such as PAVE PAWS, BMEWS, and the Missile Defense Agency X-band Radar (XBR)

=== Satellite sensors ===
Raytheon, often in conjunction with Boeing, Lockheed Martin or Northrop Grumman, is also heavily involved in the satellite sensor business. Much of its Space and Airborne Systems division in El Segundo, California is devoted to this, a business it inherited from Hughes. Examples of programs include:

- Space Tracking and Surveillance System (STSS), being developed for the Ballistic Missile Defense. Raytheon is building the sensor payload. Additionally, the El Segundo site is the company center of excellence for the development and production of laser products.
- Raytheon company's Navy Multiband Terminal (NMT) is the first advanced, next-generation satellite communications (SATCOM) system to successfully log on to and communicate with the U.S. government's Milstar SATCOM system using low and medium data rate waveforms. The system provides naval commanders and sailors with greater data capacity, as well as improved protection against enemy intercept and jamming.
- Visible Infrared Imaging Radiometer Suite (VIIRS), was developed by Raytheon Space and Airborne Sensors and is currently in operation on the Suomi NPP satellite. Future deliveries of VIIRS will fly onboard JPSS to continue the operational space based climate and weather sensing legacy of the MODIS sensors.

=== Communications ===
- The company also makes several software radio and digital communication systems for military applications such as Cooperative Engagement Capability (CEC), is participating in Navy-Marine Corps Intranet (NMCI), ECHELON and the Joint Tactical Terminal (JTT) programs.
- Digital Multimedia Watchdog, a tool used by the FBI to record phone calls and Internet communications.

=== Radioactive materials detection system ===
As part of the company's growing homeland security business and strategic focus, Raytheon has teamed with other contractors to develop an Advance Spectroscopic Portal (ASP) to allow border officials to view and identify radioactive materials in vehicles and shipping containers more effectively.

=== Semiconductors ===
Raytheon also manufactures semiconductors for the electronics industry in sites in the US and UK. In the late 20th century it produced a wide range of integrated circuits and other components, but as of 2003 its US semiconductor business specializes in gallium arsenide (GaAs) components for radio communications as well as infrared detectors. It is also making efforts to develop gallium nitride (GaN) components for next-generation radars and radios. The UK arm specialized in CMOS on silicon carbide (SiC) development and foundry work but is no longer taking on new orders, having been on the premises for 57 years.

=== Missile defense systems ===
In the framework of Ground-Based Midcourse Defense, Raytheon is developing a Ground Based Interceptor (GBI) that includes a booster missile and a kinetic Exoatmospheric Kill Vehicle (EKV), along with several key radar components, such as the Sea-Based X-Band Radar (SBX) and the Upgraded Early Warning Radar (UEWR).

=== Missiles ===
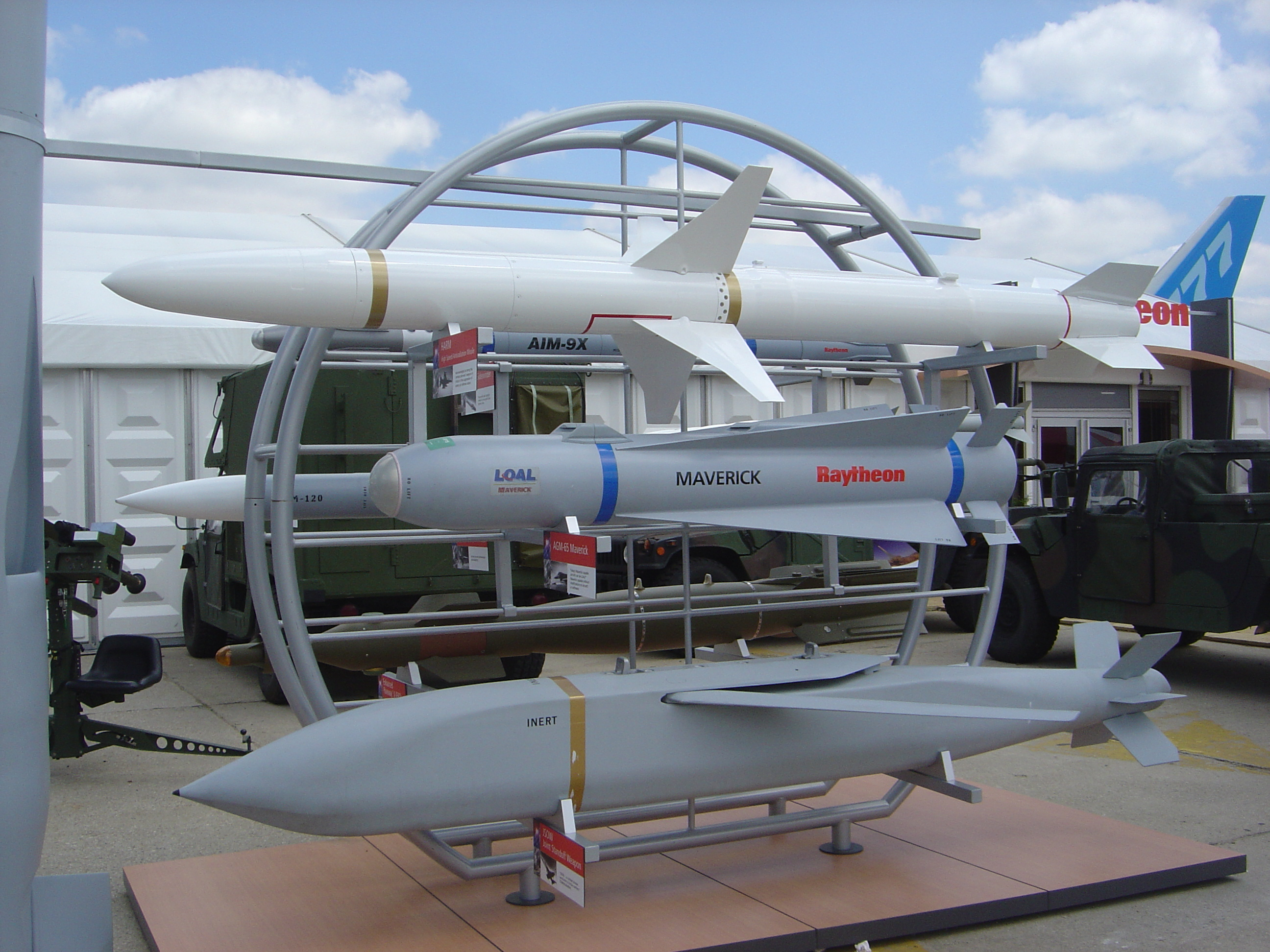
Raytheon missiles on display at the Paris Air Show, 2005

Raytheon is a developer of missiles and related missile defense systems. These include:

- AGM-65 Maverick
- AGM-88 HARM
- AGM-129 Advanced Cruise Missile
- AGM-154 Joint Standoff Weapon
- AIM-7 Sparrow
- AIM-9 Sidewinder
- AIM-54 Phoenix
- AIM-120 AMRAAM
- BGM-71 TOW
- BGM-109 Tomahawk
- FGM-148 Javelin
- FIM-92 Stinger
- GBU-28 Paveway III
- Peregrine air-to-air missile
- MIM-23 Hawk
- MIM-104 Patriot
- RIM-7 Sea Sparrow
- RIM-161 Standard Missile 3
- RIM-162 ESSM
- Pyros

== Environmental record ==
Two lawsuits were filed against a Raytheon Company plant in St. Petersburg, Florida, in April 2008, accusing the company of allowing toxic waste into the groundwater for fifteen years. Raytheon was given until the end of the month to independently test whether or not the groundwater that originated from its area was contaminated. According to the Florida Department of Environmental Protection (DEP), the groundwater contained carcinogenic contaminants, including trichloroethylene, 1,4-dioxane, and vinyl chloride. The DEP also reported that the cloudy groundwater contained other toxins such as lead and toluene.

In 1995, Raytheon acquired Dallas-based E-Systems, including a site in St. Petersburg, Florida, In November 1991, prior to Raytheon's acquisition, contamination had been discovered at the E-Systems site. Soil and groundwater had been contaminated with the volatile organic compounds trichloroethylene and 1,4-Dioxane. In 2005, groundwater monitoring indicated polluted groundwater was moving into areas outside the site. According to DEP documentation, Raytheon has tested wells on its site since 1996 but had not delivered a final report; therefore, it was given a deadline on May 31, 2008, to investigate its groundwater. Contamination in the area has not affected anyone's drinking water supply or health, yet due to negative local media coverage lawsuits are being filed with claims against Raytheon citing decreases in property values.

In another case, Raytheon was ordered by the Environmental Protection Agency (EPA) to treat groundwater at the Tucson Plant (acquired during the merger with Hughes) in Arizona since Raytheon used and disposed metals, chlorinated solvents, and other substances at the plant since 1951. The EPA further required the installation and operation of an oxidation process system to treat the solvents and make the water safe to drink.

On August 9, 2006, the Stream Contact Centre in Derry, Northern Ireland, which had a contract with Raytheon at the time, was attacked by protesters. They destroyed the computers, documents, and mainframe of the office, and proceeded to occupy it for eight hours prior to their arrest.

The activists were charged with criminal damage and affray under terrorism laws. The trial of six of the accused began May 19, 2008, in the Laganside Courts in Belfast. Colm Bryce, Gary Donnelly, Kieran Gallagher, Michael Gallagher, Sean Heaton, Jimmy Kelly, Paddy McDaid and Eamonn O'Donnell were acquitted of all charges on June 11, with Eamonn McCann found guilty of the theft of two computer discs.

By 2013, the company received a Goal Achievement Award from the EPA for meeting certain greenhouse gas reduction targets that the company had set for itself.

== Criminal and civil settlements ==
On October 16, 2024, the U.S. Department of Justice (DOJ) reported that as a result of a whistle-blower instigated DOJ investigation, the Raytheon subsidiary of RTX was entering a three-year deferred prosecution agreement (DPA) over "a major... scheme" to defraud the U.S. government over the period of 2009 to 2020, and agreeing to pay over $950M in penalties. The agreement ended a criminal investigation in connection with accusations of defective pricing (overcharging on government contracts), foreign bribery, and schemes related to export controls. The penalties included $574 million to resolve their criminal civil liability—of which $428 million is a False Claims Act settlement "for knowingly failing to provide truthful certified cost and pricing data during negotiations on numerous government contracts" over the period in question, "in violation of the Truth in Negotiations Act"—and then a further $147 million as a criminal monetary penalty, and $111 million in victim compensation.

== See also ==
- Tactical Control System
- Top 100 US Federal Contractors – $16.1 billion in FY2009
