= Ground based operational surveillance system =

The Ground-Based Operational Surveillance System, (G-BOSS) created by Raytheon Integrated Defense Systems, is a trailer-mounted tower with surveillance systems. It was integrated with the command operations center (COC) used primarily by the United States Marine Corps during the war in Afghanistan and the Iraq War. The G-BOSS is used primarily for force protection, checkpoint security, route reconnaissance, patrol over watch, improvised explosive devices emplacement detection, intelligence gathering, and personnel/vehicle identification.

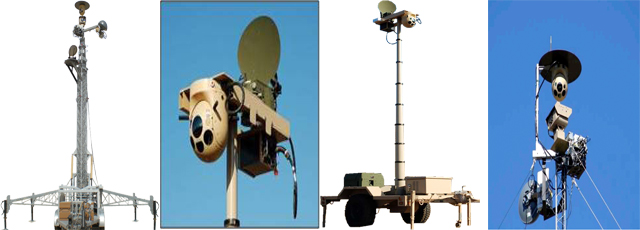
Ground-Based Operational Surveillance System and its various tower configurations.

== Description ==
The G-BOSS is an integrated surveillance system, which employs the following: a multi-spectral Electro-Optic/Infrared sensor suite with multiple detection and assessment technologies in a self-contained, mobile platform. The G-BOSS has the ability to operate independently between an 80-foot or 107-foot tower. The sensor suite is composed of: a Star SAFIRE IIIFP camera composed of lasers and rangefinders, a ThermoVision 3000 camera with a Global Positioning System (GPS), a Man-portable Surveillance and Target Acquisition Radar (MSTAR). The Ground Control Station (GCS) also contains an optional Remote Ground Station (RGS). With the above technologies, the G-BOSS has the capabilities of video capture, storage, transmission, and power generation. The G-BOSS can also integrate signals from unmanned aerial vehicles (UAVs) using VideoScout management systems along with the Tactical Remote Sensor Suite (TRSS) ground sensors. The G-BOSS has 3 variants: the G-BOSS itself, the G-BOSS Lite, and the CERBERUS Lite.

In 2013, U.S. Navy surveillance experts upgraded the G-BOSS system with DC-to-DC converters for power generation, having awarded Vicor Corporation a contract to improve the power systems. This upgrade package will include a 24-volt DC power electronics devices with 48-, 12-, and 9-volt DC outputs, 24-volt DC converters with 19.5-, 12-, and 48-volt DC outputs, and input mating connector kits.

== Origins and development ==
The G-BOSS originated and enhanced the Rapid Aerostat Initial Deployment (RAID) system. After the September 11 terrorist attacks, the RAID system was deployed to various Forward Operating Bases both in Iraq and Afghanistan. The basis for the RAID surveillance system was improved with the development of the G-BOSS. The G-BOSS took the concept of using elevated infrared sensors and put it on a stationary platform. In addition, the G-BOSS brought the addition of a second electro-optic/infrared sensor and a ground-based radar network located in the remote ground station. Included with the RAID towers are tethered blimp balloon systems (aerostats) as part of the Persistent Surveillance and Dissemination Systems, which later developed into the current G-BOSS system. The system employs a variety of sensors tethered from the blimp balloon system, and later evolved into other platforms, including fixed towers and relocated masts, which addressed logistical issues tested while on deployments.

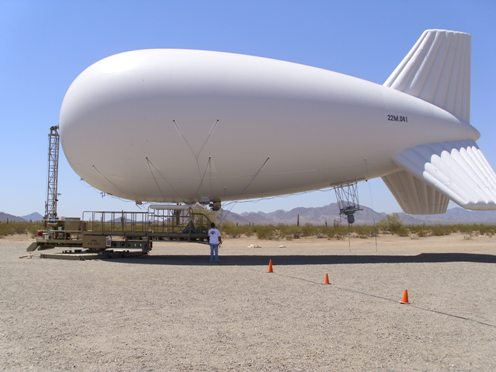
Rapid Aerostat Initial Deployment system, the predecessor to the Ground Based Operational Surveillance System.

== Operational impact ==
The majority of casualties during both the war in Afghanistan and the Iraq War were from improvised explosive devices (IEDs). Increased IED use increased the need for surveillance. In a move to counter this threat and lower the effectiveness of IEDs, the US Marine Corps directed the creation of a persistent surveillance system to identify and counter threats to security of military installations. The Marines requested the system be fielded as soon as possible. The result of this request was the development of the Ground Based Operational Surveillance System ready for rapid deployment to theater. The G-BOSS provides the command operations center with a round-the-clock display and tracking of items of interest through the use of high resolution night and day cameras. The cameras are integrated with enhanced target recognition and radar systems used to increase the ability to detect moving targets. The G-BOSS allows personnel to counter insurgent activities with an emphasis of disrupting placement of improvised explosive devices. The G-BOSS enhances situational awareness by allowing personnel to monitor activities in the vicinity of the military installation. Common places of surveillance include the gates, along the roads, borders, rivers, pipelines, and chokepoints, among other areas of responsibility and interest. The multiple towers of cameras and surveillance systems allows for 360-degree security with easily understood computer displays. Included on the computer displays are alarms and assessment data through overlay and window pop-ups, with 24/7 network running capability, allowing reduced manpower and hours in relation to personnel on guard. The multiple camera systems have the capability of routing all into a single remote ground system.

The Marine Corps Operational Test and Evaluation Activity, (MCOTEA), conducted operational tests on the G-BOSS with a simulation of the how to employ it in relation to situational awareness. From the testing of the G-BOSS, it was concluded that the most critical factor in enhancing its operational effectiveness is the positioning of the towers. The G-BOSS is best utilized in open terrain, which employs better dispersion and better performance.

The tests utilized role-players and stealth techniques of insurgents to test the intuitive nature and helping to identify attempts to mask hostile intent. The key is to increase the G-BOSS operators’ training and vigilance to counter the insurgency. The more use of stealth in relation to the G-BOSS that occurs, the slew rate provides a low proportion of correct identifications and vice versa. When the MSTAR is implemented, there is a detection of more agents and enhanced capabilities for correct identifications of personnel. However, in testing the underutilization of the MSTAR, it was concluded that the stand-alone G-BOSS is nearly as effective as it is without. The test finally concluded with the success rate of 76% in relation to the detection of improvised explosive devices, proving the ability to counter the threat of such devises.
