= Joanne M. Drake =

American political aide

Joanne M. Drake is an American political aide who served during the presidency of Ronald Reagan and as chief of staff to U.S. President Ronald Reagan during his post-presidency. She is currently the chief administrative officer of The Ronald Reagan Presidential Foundation and Institute where she oversees human resources and manages projects related to preserving Reagan's legacy.

== Career ==
Drake worked for the Republican side of the U.S. House Interior Committee. In 1984, she volunteered for the Ronald Reagan presidential campaign in Washington, D.C. In January 1985, she joined the Executive Office of the President of the United States as a staff member in the Office of Presidential Advance, where she was responsible for managing logistics for presidential trips both domestically and internationally. Drake remained in this role until December 1988, completing her work at the White House at the conclusion of Reagan's second term.

In January 1989, Drake moved to California with President Reagan as part of his post-presidential staff. She initially served as the Director of Advance, coordinating the President’s travel and event logistics. In 1994, following Fred Ryan's departure, Drake was appointed Chief of Staff to President Reagan, overseeing his schedule, public appearances, and correspondence during his retirement years.

Drake also played a role in commemorating Ronald Reagan's legacy. In 2004, she coordinated the state funeral of Ronald Reagan, managing arrangements for the multi-day national event. Later, in 2016, she organized the funeral service for Nancy Reagan.

In 2005, Drake joined the Ronald Reagan Presidential Foundation and Institute as chief administrative officer. In this role, she took responsibility for the organization’s human resources needs and managed projects to promote Reagan’s legacy, including the placement of bronze statues of the former president in the U.S. Capitol Rotunda, Ronald Reagan Washington National Airport, Grosvenor Square in London, and the U.S. Embassy in Berlin.

On April 7, 2023, Drake was sanctioned by the Chinese government after Taiwanese President Tsai Ing-wen gave a speech at the Ronald Reagan Presidential Foundation.
