= Applied Signal Technology =

- Traded as: AST
- Industry: Defense; Intelligence; Homeland security
- Founded: 1984
- Parent: Raytheon

Applied Signal Technology (Nasdaq: APSG; also known as AST) is a provider of advanced intelligence, surveillance and reconnaissance (ISR) products, systems, and services, established in 1984 in Sunnyvale, California. Its 2009 revenue was $202.6 million with a profit of $22.9 million.

AST serves the defense, intelligence, homeland security, and select commercial markets. Its products are used to scan and filter cell phone, ship-to-shore, microwave, and military transmissions and evaluate them for relevant information.

In February 2011, AST was acquired by military contractor Raytheon for $490 million. William B. Van Vleet III served as the company's president and CEO prior to being acquired by Raytheon.
