= United Nations Security Council Resolution 2048 =

UN Security Council Resolution 2048
- Guinea-Bissau within the African Union
- Date: 18 May 2012
- Meeting no.: 6,774
- Code: S/RES/2048 (Document)
- Subject: The Situation in Guinea-Bissau
- Voting summary: 15 voted for; None voted against; None abstained
- Result: Adopted

Security Council composition
- Permanent members: China; France; Russia; United Kingdom; United States
- Non-permanent members: Azerbaijan; Colombia; Germany; Guatemala; India; Morocco; Pakistan; Portugal; South Africa; Togo

United Nations Security Council Resolution 2048 was unanimously adopted on 18 May 2012.

== See also ==
- List of United Nations Security Council Resolutions 2001 to 2100
