= Aevex Aerospace =

US research and development organization

AEVEX Corp.
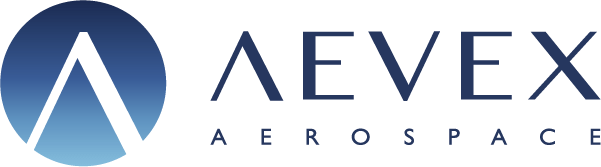
- Type: Public
- Traded as: NYSE: AVEX; Defense technology company
- Industry: Defense
- Founded: 2017
- Headquarters: Solana Beach, California, U.S.
- Area served: Worldwide
- Key people: Roger Wells (CEO); Brian Raduenz (chairman)
- Number of employees: 650 (2026)
- Website: aevex.com

Aevex is an American defense industry firm specializing in airborne intelligence gathering solutions, headquartered in Solana Beach, California. The company designs aircraft, integrates sensors and payloads and provides flight test support services. According to CNN reporter Barbara Starr, Aevex "does work for US special operations, specifically for covert special operations units."

== History ==
Aevex is an American defense contractor, formed through the consolidation of three defense contractors: Merlin Global Services, CSG Solutions, and Special Operations Solutions - specialized in the development of advanced autonomous systems. Headquartered in Solana Beach, California and was founded in 2017 by Brian Raduenz. Aevex provides airborne intelligence, surveillance and reconnaissance offerings to the U.S. government and other countries. Aevex also specializes in unmanned weapons systems that can deliver precision guided strikes against targets in GPS denied environments. The company currently employs 650 people.

In August 2026, Aevex purchased the Baltimore based unmanned surface vessel company BlackSea Technologies for $650M USD. This expanded their capabilities within the air, surface, and sea domains.

On 10 October 2024, the Taipei Times reported that AEVEX showcased two drones and announced expanded operations in Taiwan. The Vandal and the Onyx were the drones developed in collaboration with Taiwanese drone maker Coretronic Intelligent Robotics (CIRC).

== Products ==
Aevex’s “Phoenix Ghost” family of systems, developed with the Air Force and deployed within Ukraine starting in 2022.

1st CAB Tests ATLAS in Germany

- Disruptor is a Group 3 drone with 14 hours of endurance, over 621 mile range, and a 50 pound payload capacity. It functions as a precision-strike UAS, but it can also carry ISR and electronic warfare payloads.
- Atlas is a precision strike system and has a maximum takeoff weight of 20.9 pounds, including an 8.1-pound payload, is 2.9 feet long and has a wingspan of 5.5 feet. It serves as a Group 2 platform designed to support intelligence, surveillance and reconnaissance (ISR) as well as strike missions.
- Raker an (ISR) drone with 16 hours of endurance and an over-600 mile range. The payload capacity up to 67 pounds.

BlackSea's family of autonomous sea based systems.

Global Autonomous Reconnaissance Craft Deployed during BALTOPS 25

- GARC is 16 feet designed for ISR, autonomy and distributed maritime ops.
- Comet is 43 feet with top speeds of 45 knots and a 10,000 pound payload capacity. Comet has a combat focus with a large payload capacity, such as the AGM-114 Hellfires.
- NightTrain is autonomous logistics low profile vessel built to move ISO containers and supplies directly to shorelines.
- Chaser is the second iteration and combat focused GARC. Improvements include more weapons integration and a slightly larger profile.
