= Raytheon Missiles & Defense =

Part of Raytheon Technologies

- Type: Subsidiary
- Industry: Aerospace and defense
- Predecessor: Hughes Missile Systems Co. and Raytheon Missile Systems Division (via merger)
- Defunct: July 1, 2023
- Successor: Raytheon
- Headquarters: Tucson, Arizona, United States
- Key people: Wes Kremer, President
- Number of employees: 30,000 (2020)
- Parent: RTX Corporation
- Website: www.raytheonmissilesanddefense.com

Raytheon Missiles & Defense (RMD) was one of four business segments of RTX Corporation. Headquartered in Tucson, Arizona, its president was Wes Kremer. The business produced a broad portfolio of advanced technologies, including air and missile defense systems, precision weapons, radars, and command and control systems. Raytheon Intelligence & Space was merged with Raytheon Missiles & Defense in July 2023 to form the Raytheon business segment.

== History ==
The business was a combination of two Raytheon Company legacy businesses, Raytheon Integrated Defense Systems (IDS) and Raytheon Missile Systems (RMS), which operated a plant formerly owned by the Hughes Aircraft Company.

Raytheon had been criticized for selling arms to Saudi Arabia that were used in the Yemen Civil War. These sales were blocked by the Obama administration in 2016 due to humanitarian concerns, a decision that was reversed by the Trump administration six months later.

On May 22, 2024, the unit was sanctioned by the Chinese government due to arms sales to Taiwan.

== Products ==
Key Raytheon Missiles & Defense capabilities combined key IDS and RMS capabilities. Key IDS capabilities include:

- Ground-based and sea-based radars for air and missile defense
- Navy radar and sonar
- Torpedoes and naval mine countermeasures

Key RMS capabilities include:

- Missiles and precision-guided munitions
- Drones and air-launched decoys
- Counter-drone and non-lethal directed energy weapons
- Ground vehicle sensors and weapons
- Ground based operational surveillance system

The division's products included:

- Active Denial System non-lethal millimeter wave weapon
- AGM-65 Maverick air-to-surface missile
- AGM-88 HARM air-to-surface missile
- AGM-129 ACM air-to-surface missile
- AGM-154 Joint Standoff Weapon air-to-surface glide bomb
- AGM-176 Griffin air-to-surface missile
- AIM-7 Sparrow air-to-air missile
  - RIM-7 Sea Sparrow naval surface-to-air missile
- AIM-9 Sidewinder air-to-air missile
- AIM-54 Phoenix air-to-air missile
- AIM-120 AMRAAM air-to-air missile
- Peregrine air-to-air missile
- AIM-424 LRAAM air-to-air missile
- AN/SPY-6 Air and Missile Defense Radar (AMDR) for Navy ships
- AN/TPY-2 radar for the THAAD missile defense system
- AN/AQS-20C Mine hunting sonar suite
- AN/ASQ-235 Airborne Mine Neutralization System (AMNS)
- BGM-71 TOW anti-tank missile
- BGM-109 Tomahawk cruise missile
- Coyote unmanned aerial system
- David's Sling Medium to long range surface-to-air/anti-ballistic missile (partner with prime contractor Rafael Advanced Defense Systems)
- Extended Range Guided Munition
- Exoatmospheric Kill Vehicle anti-ICBM system
- FGM-148 Javelin anti-tank missile
- FIM-92 Stinger person-portable air defense system surface-to-air missile
- M982 Excalibur guided artillery round
- MIM-23 Hawk surface-to-air missile
- MIM-104 Patriot surface-to-air missile
- Paveway laser-guided bomb
- Phalanx CIWS naval anti-missile defense system
- RIM-116 Rolling Airframe Missile naval surface-to-air missile
- RIM-162 Evolved Sea Sparrow Missile naval surface-to-air missile
- Standard Missile family of naval missiles
  - RIM-66 Standard
  - RIM-67 Standard
  - RIM-161 Standard Missile 3
  - RIM-174 Standard ERAM
- SAM-N-2 Lark
