= Raytheon Intelligence, Information and Services =

Business unit of Raytheon Company

Coordinates: 32°53′55.62″N 96°40′53.48″W

- Industry: Intelligence and Surveillance
- Predecessor: E-Systems, Inc.
- Founded: 1995; 31 years ago
- Headquarters: Dulles, Virginia, United States
- Number of locations: 551 sites
- Operating income: $538 million (2018)
- Number of employees: 17,000
- Parent: Raytheon Company

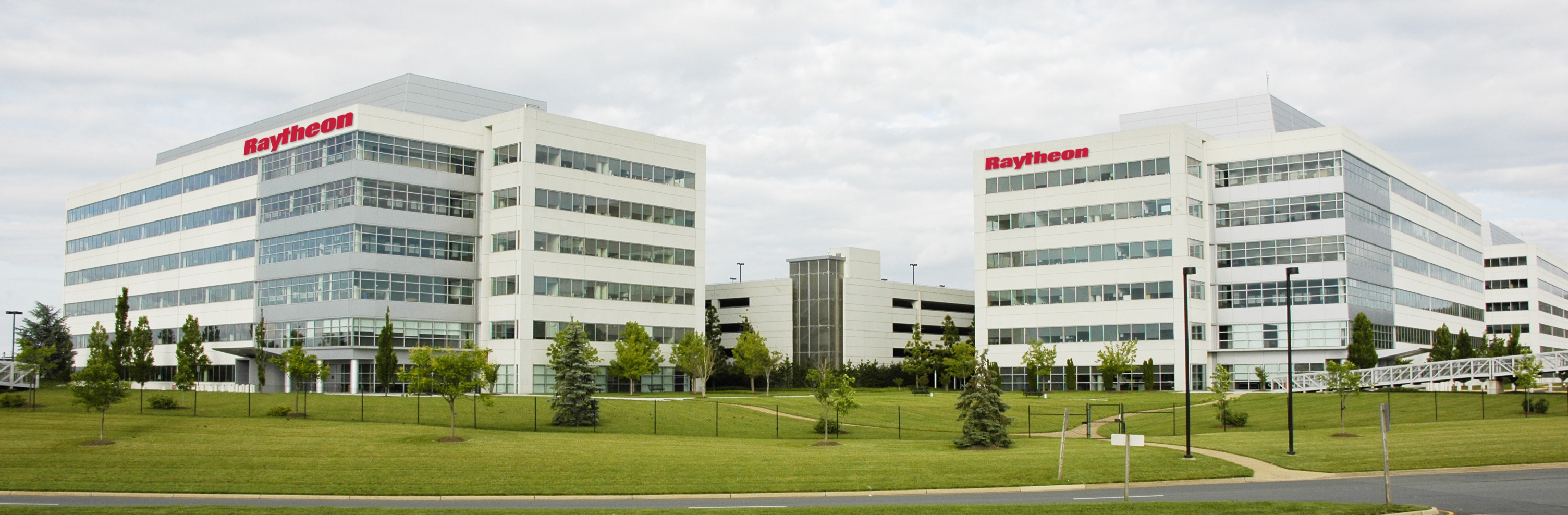
The Raytheon Intelligence, Information and Services headquarters in Dulles, Virginia

Raytheon Intelligence, Information, and Services (RIIS or IIS) is a business unit of Raytheon Company headquartered in Dulles, Virginia. IIS specializes in intelligence, surveillance, and reconnaissance, advanced cybersecurity services; weather and environmental services, and information-based services for homeland security. The company also provides training, logistics, engineering, product support, and operational support services and solutions for mission support, homeland security, space, civil aviation, counter-proliferation, and counter-terrorism markets.

== History ==
Originally founded as LTV Electro Systems in the mid-1960s, the company changed its name to E-Systems in the early 1970s. In 1995, Raytheon Company acquired E-Systems, Inc., a Texas-based company that designed, developed, produced, and serviced high-technology systems including surveillance, verification, and aircraft ground-land navigation equipment. The company also developed electronics programs and systems for business, industrial, and non-defense government programs and agencies. E-Systems was renamed Raytheon Intelligence and Information Systems.

In 2013, Raytheon Company announced the consolidation of its six internal business units to four. Intelligence and Information Systems was combined with Raytheon Technical Services Company and renamed Raytheon Intelligence, Information and Services.

== Technologies and capabilities ==
- Data & Network Security
- Big data Analytics, Processing and Dissemination
- Command and Control of Air and Space Vehicles
- Geospatial Intelligence (GEOINT)
- Automation and Machine Learning
- Signal and Image Processing
- Air Traffic Management Solutions
- Mission Systems Integration
- Training & Knowledge Management
- Operations, Maintenance and Engineering
- Logistics & Product Support

== Organization ==
Raytheon Intelligence, Information, and Services is organized into four business units, known internally as Mission Areas:

=== Cybersecurity and Special Missions (CSM) ===
The Cybersecurity and Special Missions (CSM) mission area provides end-to-end cyber capabilities that address data and network security threats to governments and critical infrastructure. CSM provides customers with computer network defense, advanced persistent threat protection, and cyber hardening of military systems and critical infrastructure. In addition to advanced technologies, CSM develops integrated systems, trade craft and support capabilities for a broad spectrum of special missions.

=== Global Intelligence Solutions (GIS) ===
The Global Intelligence Solutions (GIS) mission area develops and integrates large-scale, high-performance signals intelligence (SIGINT), geospatial intelligence (GEOINT), and Multi-INT systems. GIS provides commercial and intelligence customers with large-scale information processing, integration, and visualization systems for intelligence, satellite, and space-based programs. It also supports national security objectives by providing comprehensive technical, analytical and operational support to the intelligence community.

=== Mission Support and Modernization (MSM) ===
The Mission Support and Modernization (MSM) mission area provides full life-cycle mission operations, engineering, sustainment and modernization services for site and platform missions, as well as multi-intelligence (Multi-INT) ground systems, multi-domain command and control systems, commercial software integration, border security and unmanned systems technology.

=== Navigation, Weather and Services (NWS) ===
The Navigation, Weather and Services (NWS) mission area provides satellite-based mission planning and data processing to support civil and military missions, specializing in the ground systems needed to launch, operate and plan satellite missions. NWS also provides modernized air traffic management with a focus on cyber-hardened avionics, GPS-guided precision landing, and enhanced weather planning. NWS is building the control segment that will operate the next generation of Global Positioning System (GPS) satellites, known as GPS OCX. It also provides environmental solutions for defense, civil, commercial and international customers.

== Locations ==
Raytheon Intelligence, Information and Services operates out of several major locations in the US, including:

- Dulles, Virginia – corporate headquarters
- Richardson, Texas
- Aurora, Colorado
- Orlando, Florida
- Indianapolis, Indiana
- Linthicum, Maryland
- Riverdale Park, Maryland
- Omaha, Nebraska
- State College, Pennsylvania
- Burlington, Massachusetts

== Former presidents ==
- David Wajsgras (2015–2020)
- Lynn Dugle (2009–2015)
- Mike Keebaugh (2002–2009)
