= América Air Linhas Aéreas =

Brazilian airline

- Operating bases: São Paulo, Brazil.
- Fleet size: See Fleet below

América Air Linhas Aéreas is a small airline based in São Paulo, Brazil.

== Fleet ==
The airline flies the Embraer EMB-120 Brasilia.
