= Kolwezi International Airport =

Kolwezi International Airport Aéroport international de Kolwezi
- IATA: KWZ; ICAO: FZQM

Summary
- Airport type: Public
- Operator: Government
- Serves: Kolwezi, DRC
- Elevation AMSL: 5,007 ft (1,526 m)
- Coordinates: 10°45′57″S 025°30′21″E

Map
- Location in the Democratic Republic of the Congo

Runways
Direction	Length		Surface
Direction	m	ft	Surface
11/29	2,410	7,907	Asphalt
- Source: GCM Google Maps

Kolwezi International Airport (IATA: KWZ, ICAO: FZQM) is an airport serving Kolwezi, the capital of Lualaba District in the Democratic Republic of the Congo. The airport is 6 kilometres (3.7 mi) south of Kolwezi.

The Kolwezi non-directional beacon (Ident: KWZ) is located 0.7 nautical miles (1.3 km) west of the airport.

== History ==
On 11 June 2025, Lualaba Vice-Governor Fifi Masuka Saini and President Félix Tshisekedi inaugurated the international terminal of the airport in a ribbon-cutting ceremony. It was broadcast on national television and YouTube by RTNC. The terminal is fully compliant with ICAO standards and is updated with new amenities.

== Airlines and destinations ==
Airlines	Destinations
Air Congo	Kinshasa-N'djili
Compagnie Africaine d'Aviation	Lubumbashi

== Accidents and incidents ==
On 17 November 2025 an Embraer ERJ145LR, operating as AirJet Angola flight MBC100, carrying about 20 people, including the Minerals Minister, Louis Watum Kabamba, overshot the runway while attempting to land. The aircraft then ignited. All passengers were able to evacuate without any injuries. The aircraft was responding to an earlier bridge collapse at a mine which had killed 49 people.

== See also ==
- Transport in the Democratic Republic of the Congo
- List of airports in the Democratic Republic of the Congo
