= Embraer ERJ family =

Regional jet airliner family

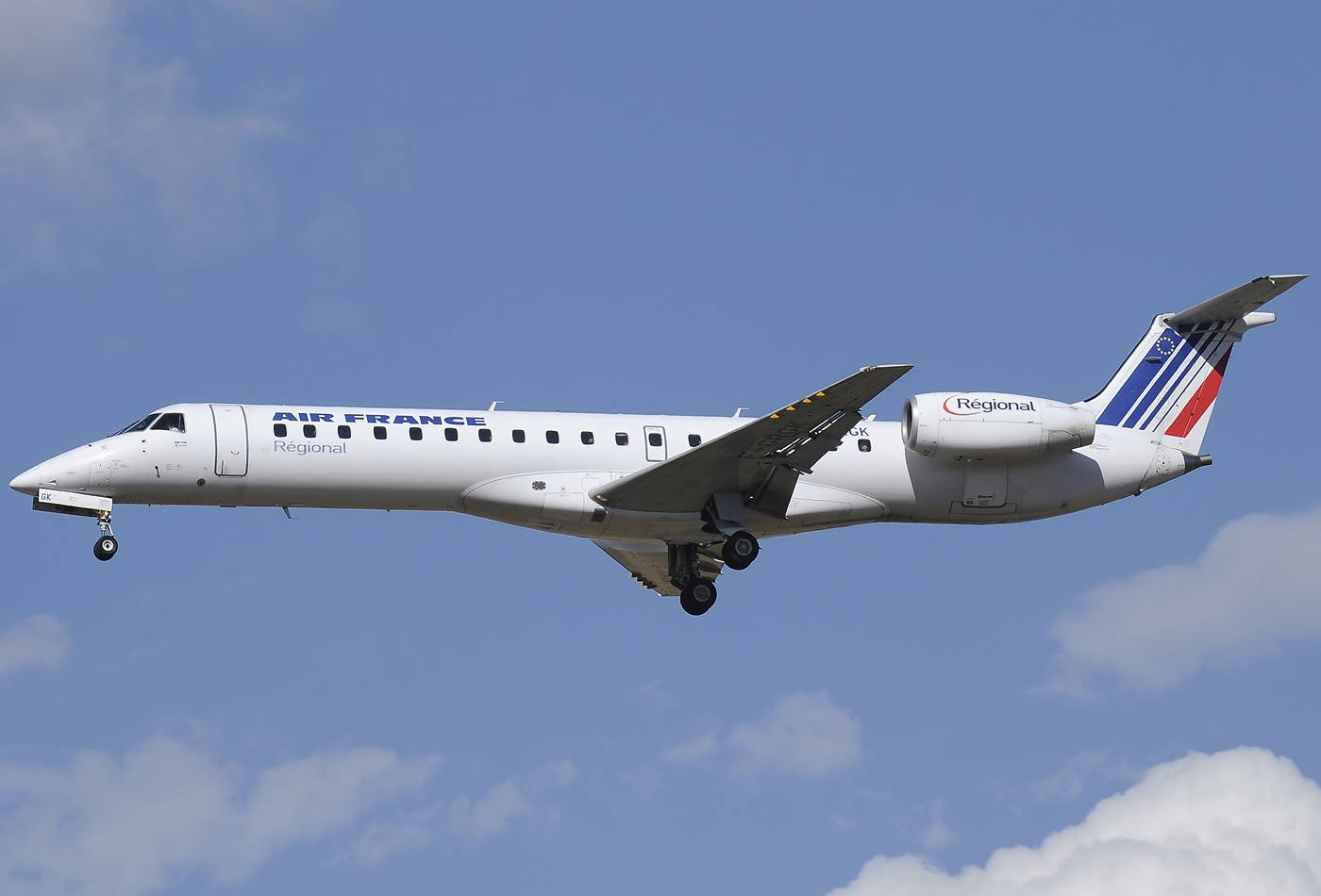
- An Air France Régional ERJ-145

General information
- Type: Regional jet
- National origin: Brazil
- Manufacturer: Embraer
- Status: In service
- Primary users: CommuteAir: Piedmont Airlines; Airlink; JSX
- Number built: 1,231

History
- Manufactured: 1992–2020; 2003–2016 (China)
- Introduction date: 6 April 1997
- First flight: 11 August 1995
- Developed from: Embraer EMB 120 Brasilia
- Variants: Embraer E/P/R-99; Embraer Legacy 600

The Embraer ERJ family (for Embraer Regional Jet) are regional jets designed and produced by the Brazilian aerospace company Embraer. The family includes the ERJ 135 (37 passengers), ERJ 140 (44 passengers), and ERJ 145 (50 passengers), as well as the Legacy 600 business jet and the R-99 family of military aircraft.

Development of the ERJ 145 was launched in 1989. Its early design took the form of a turbofan-powered stretch of the existing turboprop-powered EMB 120 Brasilia regional aircraft. After the project was temporarily suspended in 1990, work on a revised configuration was undertaken during the early 1990s. While retaining the three-abreast seating of the Brasilia, the twinjet featured a new swept wing and is powered by two rear-fuselage-mounted Rolls-Royce AE 3007 turbofans for a range up to 2,000 nautical miles [nmi] (3,700 km; 2,300 mi). By the time of its maiden flight on 11 August 1995, Embraer had garnered 18 firm orders, 16 options and 127 letters of intent for the type. On 10 December 1996, the ERJ 145 received its type certificate; it entered revenue service with ExpressJet Airlines on 6 April 1997.

Embraer prioritised the rapid expansion of the family, leading to the introduction of the shortened ERJ 135 and ERJ 140 in 1999. The ERJ series' primary competition came from the similarly sized Bombardier CRJ100/200 regional jets. In December 2002, Embraer entered a partnership with the Chinese aerospace manufacturer Harbin Aircraft Industry Group to jointly produce the ERJ 145 in Harbin, China; this production line was shuttered in 2016 after producing 41 aircraft. Overall production of the type was terminated in 2020, by which point 1,231 aircraft were built. By this point, the ERJ family had been eclipsed by the newer and more advanced E-Jet family.

== Development ==
=== Background and early design ===
The ERJ 145 was designed for a perceived new market for regional jet aircraft, where the increased speed, comfort and passenger appeal would outweigh the inherent fuel economy of the turboprop aircraft which were in service and in development.

The original EMB 145 Amazon design with a straight wing and overwing engines

The 45–48 seat EMB 145, nicknamed Amazon, was launched at the Paris Air Show in 1989 as an 18-foot (5.5 m) stretch of the EMB 120 Brasilia developed for US$150 million plus $50 million for training and marketing, one third the cost of the cancelled Short Brothers FJX project. Its $11 million unit cost would have been $3 million less than the Canadair CRJ. The jet was anticipated to be able to travel at 400 knots (740 km/h; 460 mph), equipped with the CFE738, Lycoming ALF 502 or Rolls-Royce/Allison AB580 turbofan engines, with the model to be selected in the summer of 1989. It was targeted for a late 1992 introduction with six produced, then ramping to 60 per year by 1995. It aimed for half of a market for 1,000 aircraft with break-even after twelve years with 400 sold.

Keeping 75% of the Brasilia parts and systems, the EMB 145 Amazon aimed for a 1991 first flight. The stretch resulted from two 11-foot (3.4 m) plugs of the 7-foot-6-inch (2.29 m) diameter fuselage in the front and behind the redesigned 538-square-foot (50.0 m^{2}) wing. Its supercritical airfoil with a 14% root thickness had its chord extended at the leading edge with a slight sweepback, increased aspect ratio and winglets. The overwing podded engines were expected to generate 6,400 pounds-force (28 kN) of thrust. Designed for 500–600 nmi (930–1,110 km; 580–690 mi) stages, up to 1,400 nmi (2,600 km; 1,600 mi) with a reduced payload, it had a 36,375 lb (16,500 kg) maximum takeoff weight (MTOW) and a 21,045 lb (9,546 kg) operating empty weight.

=== Engine selection ===
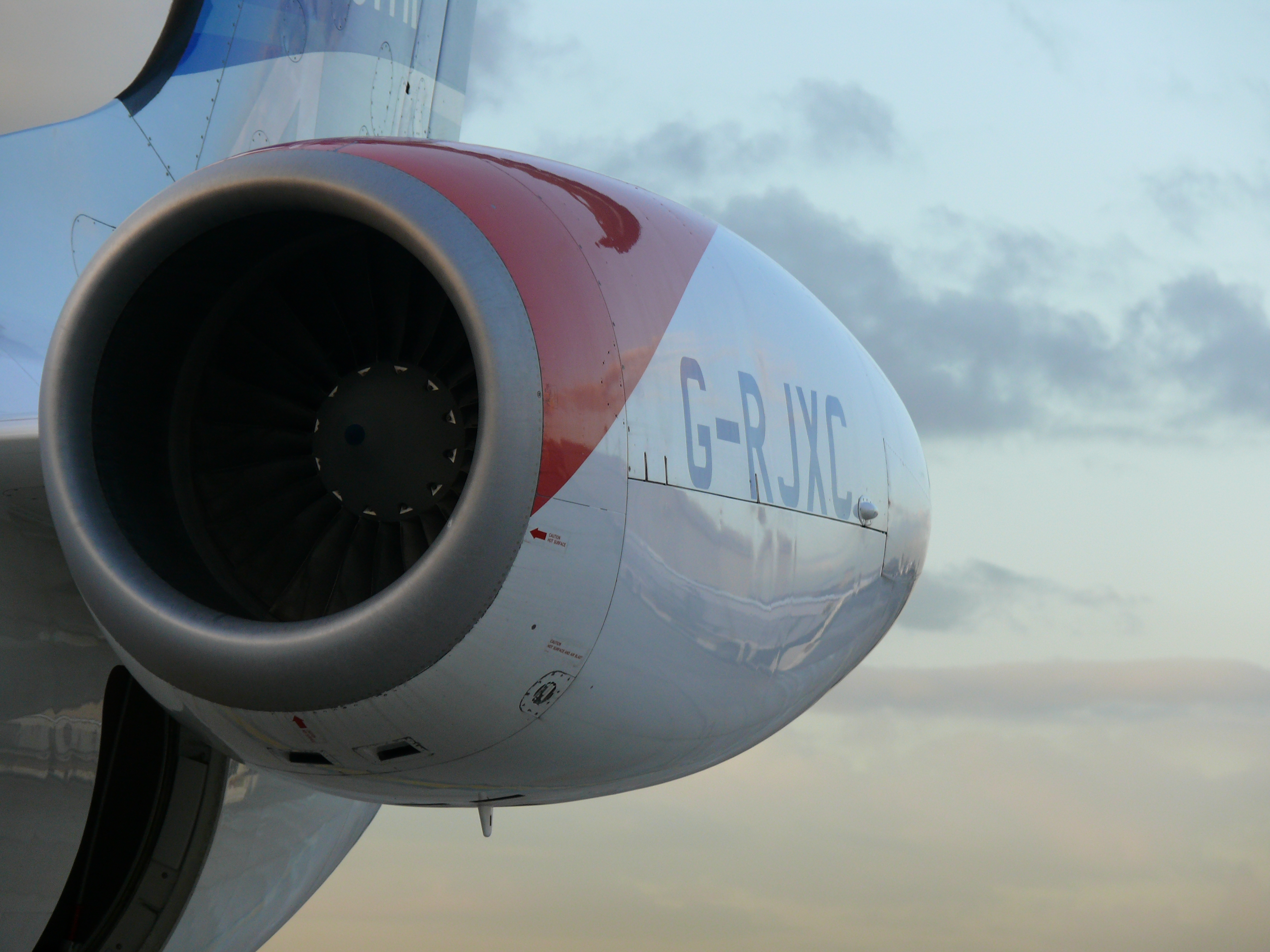
AE3007 Turbofan

In early 1990, no engine supplier willing to share the risk of the $250 million development was yet selected. The Allison GMA3007 (later renamed the Rolls-Royce AE 3007) was selected in March 1990, with a maximum 40 kN (7,100 lbf) take-off thrust and growth capability to 45 kN (10,000 lbf), first flight was then due in September 1991. Rolls-Royce could participate in the fan and low-pressure turbine, its original responsibility on the RB.580 joint development. By May, it had 296 commitments from 19 operators, and was seeking external finance. In June, maiden flight was expected by the end of 1990 before mid-1993 deliveries for $11.5 million each, cabin pressurisation was increased to 0.55 bar (8.0 psi) from the Brasilia 0.48 bar (7.0 psi).

Following the engine selection, design was revised: length decreased from 27.08 to 26.74 m (88.8 to 87.7 ft), span increased from 22.37 to 22.49 m (73.4 to 73.8 ft), aspect ratio to 9.3 from 9.2. MTOW rose from 16,500 to 18,500 kg (36,400 to 40,800 lb), basic operating weight from 9,560 to 10,940 kg (21,080 to 24,120 lb), maximum fuel from 3,900 to 4,210 kg (8,600 to 9,280 lb) and payload from 4,500 to 5,160 kg (9,920 to 11,380 lb); wing loading increased from 330 to 370 kg/m^{2} (68 to 76 lb/sq ft), time-to-climb to FL400 gained 5 min to 30 min and maximum cruise rose from 405 to 428 kn (750 to 793 km/h) at FL360. The first delivery in 1993 was slated to Comair, which ordered 60. In November 1990, a major reduction in Brazilian government spending, which held 61% of its voting share, resulted in Embraer laying off 32% of its 12,800 employees and suspending development of the EMB 145 for six months.

=== Revised design ===
Revised design with swept wing and underwing engines

In March 1991, a revised configuration started wind tunnel testing: the quarter chord wing sweep increased to 22.3° with underslung engines for lower aerodynamic drag. This reduced the span by almost 2 to 20.5 m (6 ft 7 in to 67 ft 3 in), reducing its aspect ratio from 9.3 to 8.4 and wing area from 50 to 47 m^{2} (540 to 510 sq ft). The semi-monocoque wing has two main and one auxiliary spar and holds 4,500 kg (9,900 lb) of fuel, it has double-slotted fowler flaps and spoilers. To accommodate the underwing engines, the landing gear is longer, allowing use of jetways, and the fuselage was lengthened from 25.8 to 26 m (85 to 85 ft).

During June 1991, the Brazilian Government loaned $600 million to Embraer and in July the programme was re-evaluated while tooling was 80% complete. By November 1991, Embraer was still looking for partners to share the risk of the $350 million project, hoping to obtain Government approval by the end of the year. Sold at $12 million with an all-digital cockpit and 31.8 kN (7,100 lbf) engines, it had letters of intent for 337 units. The scheduled date for the first flight slipped to 1992 and certification for late 1993.

=== Definitive design ===
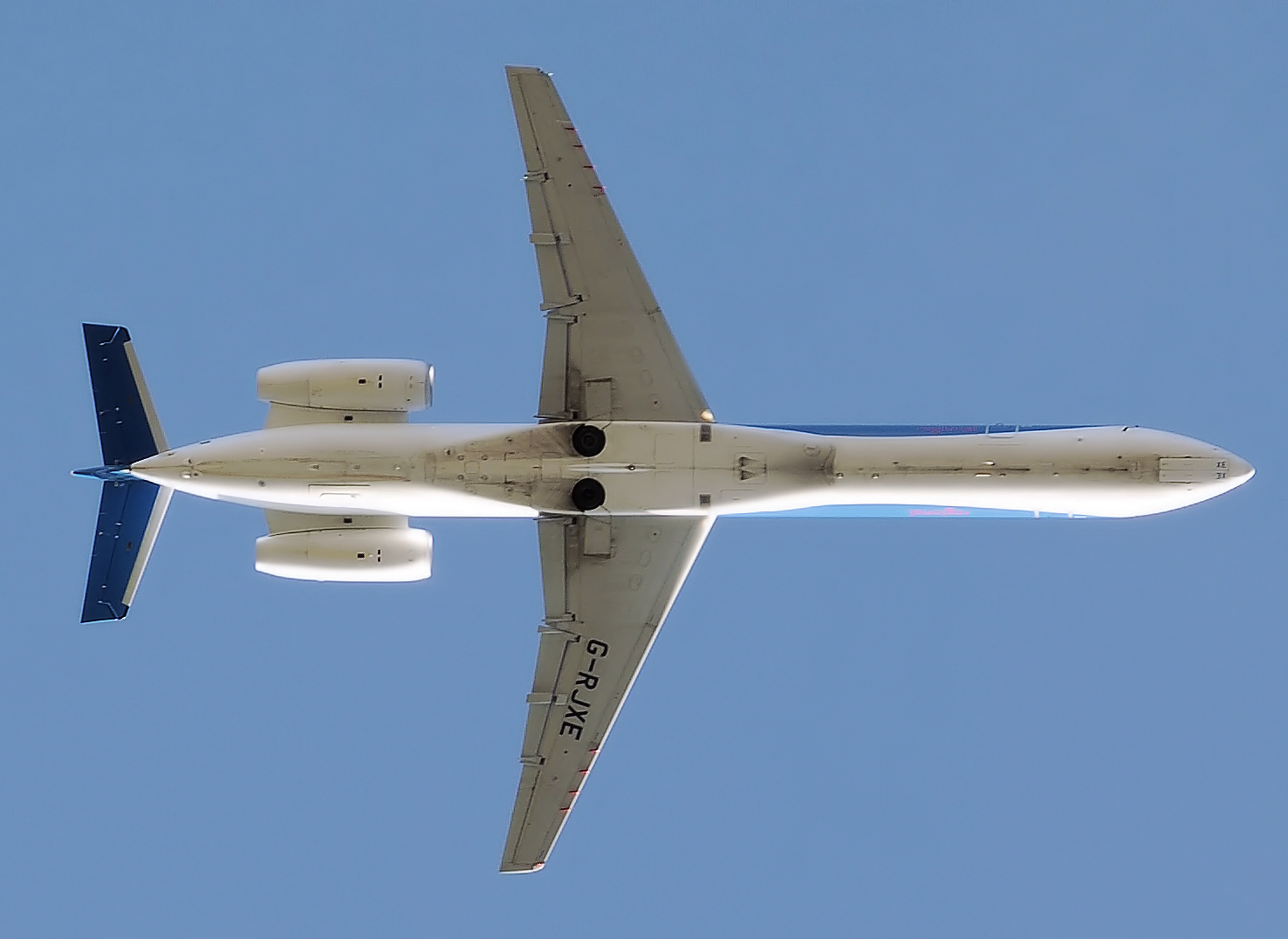
ERJ 145 planform view

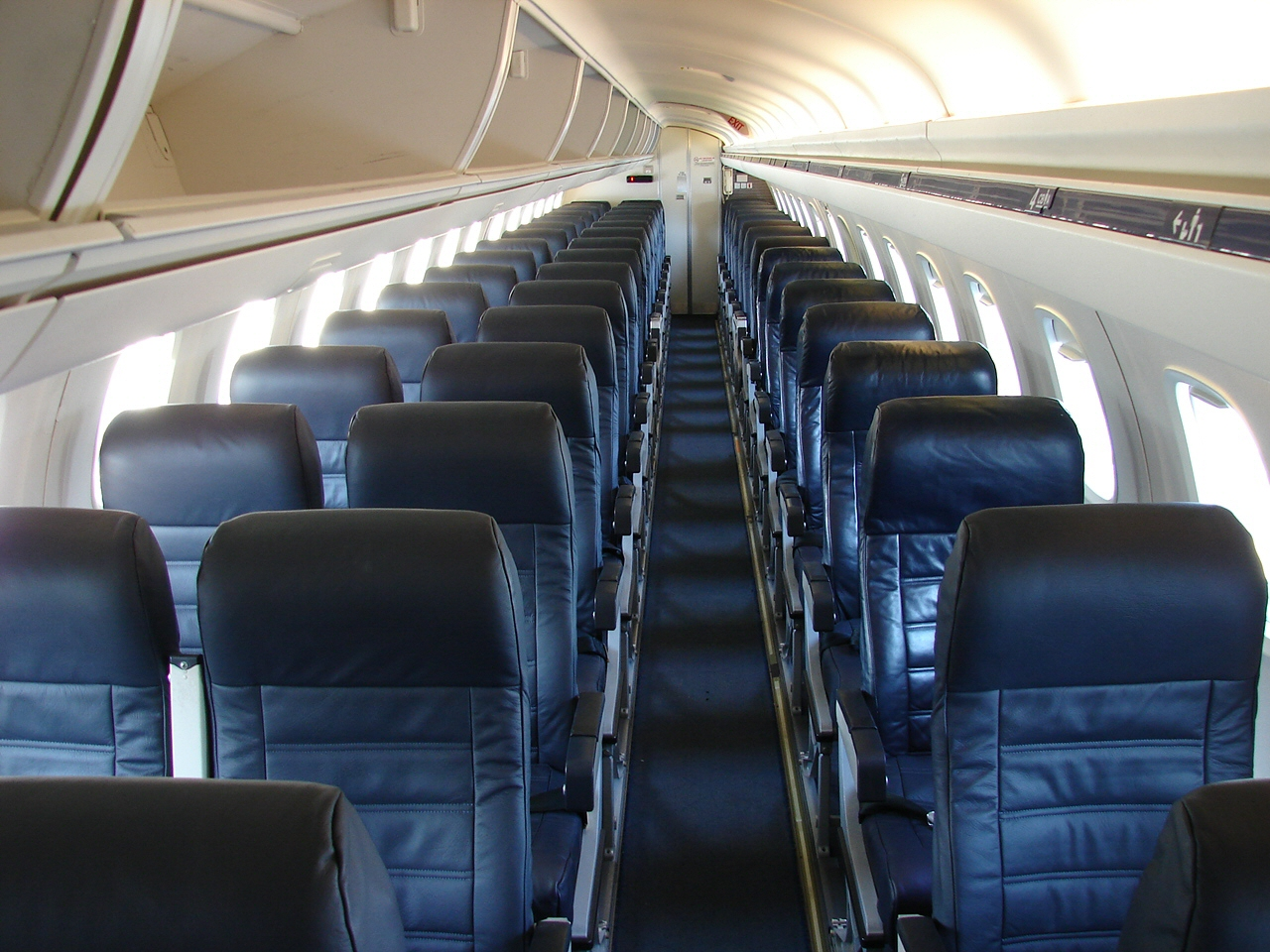
Three-abreast cabin

After re-evaluation late in 1991, the layout was again revised with two rear-fuselage-mounted engines, and a Mach 0.8 cruise speed would be tested in the wind tunnel. Seat pitch is 79 cm (31 in). A further stretch to 50–55 passengers is limited by a 12° rotation angle. Embraer continued to look for partners to share the $350 million development as first flight was expected for late 1994. In December 1994, Embraer was privatised for 80% to Brazilian and US investors while 20% was kept by the Brazilian Government.

The definitive ERJ 145 first flew on August 11, 1995, with 18 firm orders, 16 options and 127 letters of intent. A 1,300h flight-test programme for the prototype and three pre-series aircraft (excluding two ground-test airframes) was planned within 13 months for certification in the third quarter of 1996, before deliveries in the fourth quarter of 1996 to launch customer Flight West. The $14.5 million aircraft is developed with risk-sharing partners including Spain's Gamesa producing the wing; Chile's Enaer for the tail; and the USA's C&D Interiors equipping the cabin. The standard maximum ramp weight is 19,300 and 20,300 kg (42,500 and 44,800 lb) for the extended-range, it is fitted with Honeywell Primus 1000 integrated avionics.

The estimated $300 million development cost is divided between Embraer for 34%, risksharing partners for 33% (including Belgium's SONACA supplying centre and rear fuselage sections, doors, engine pylons and wing leading-edges), long-term loans from Brazilian development-funding institutions for 23% and participating suppliers for 10%. On both 370 km (200 nm) hubfeeder and 1,100 km hub-bypass sectors, the EMB145 was expected to offer lower operating costs than the similarly priced Saab 2000 high-speed turboprop and the CRJ. Its $15 million price was $4 million lower than the CRJ.

The Flight Test campaign took four aircraft: S/N 801, PT-ZJA, S/N 001, PT-ZJB, S/N 002, PT-ZJC and S/N 003, PT-ZJD. Only S/N 003 was fitted with passenger seats and had no FTI (flight test instrumentation) and was used for functional and reliability tests.

In July 1996, its certification was targeted for October, and the unit cost was then forecast to be US$15 million. The first delivery was planned for late November, while 29 aircraft were to be produced in 1997, 38 in 1998 and at least 48 per year thereafter. Its MTOW could be raised from the standard 19,200 to 20,600 kg (42,300 to 45,400 lb) for an Enhanced Range version. Flight tests allowed to increase its cruise speed to Mach 0.78 from 0.74, and showed fuel economy was 7% better than predicted. Before the Summer 1996 Farnborough Airshow, Embraer held 62 firm orders and 218 options. Continental Express then purchased 25 EMB145s and took 175 options. More than 50 seats would need a wider fuselage for four-abreast seating, an enlarged wing and a more powerful turbofan.

On 10 December 1996, type certification was issued by the Federal Aviation Administration (FAA), clearing the type for operational use in North America.

Embraer delivered 892 units of all variants through 2006, and predicted that another 102 units would be delivered in the 2007–2016 time period.

=== Production in China ===
During December 2002, Embraer entered a partnership with the Chinese aerospace manufacturer Harbin Aircraft Industry Group, resulting in the creation of Harbin Embraer Aircraft Industry, a joint venture company, to locally produce the ERJ 145 in Harbin for the Chinese market. The assembly line was sized to produce a maximum of 24 aircraft per year, assembling complete knock down kits prepared by Embraer at its facilities overseas. During February 2004, the first delivery of a Chinese-assembled ERJ 145 took place; two months later, China Southern took delivery for two of the locally-built ERJ145s.

In April 2009, it was announced that Hainan Airlines had halved its original order for 50 ERJ145s from the joint venture. By April 2011, 41 aircraft had reportedly been produced in China, considerably less than the line's capacity. By this time, the company was undertaking changes to facilitate the local production of the similar Embraer Legacy 650 business jet as well. In March 2016, the final delivery of aircraft produced by the joint venture took place. Two months later, the discontinuation of the local assembly initiative was announced; it was reported that in excess of 40 ERJ 145 and five Legacy 650s had been completed by this point.

=== Shortened versions ===
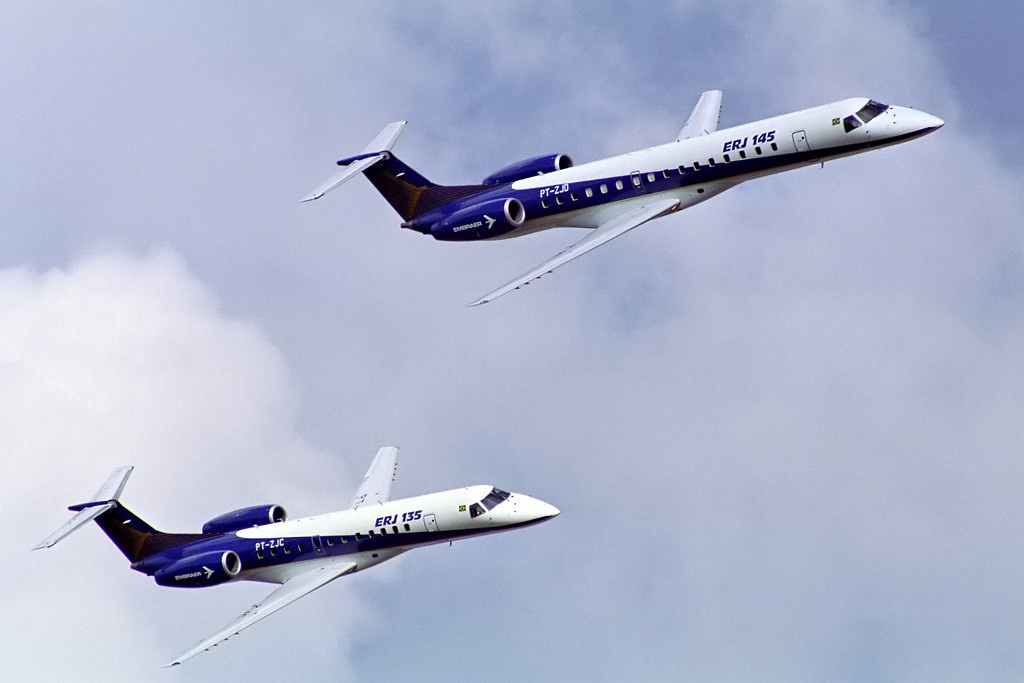
The ERJ 145 with the ERJ 135 at Farnborough in 2000

Embraer has introduced two shortened versions of the ERJ145. All three aircraft share the same crew type rating, allowing pilots to fly any of the three aircraft without the need for further training.

The ERJ 140 is 1.42 metres (4 ft 8 in) shorter, seating 44 passengers, and has 96% parts commonality with the ERJ145. The only significant changes are a shorter fuselage, a slightly derated engine and an increased range. The ERJ140 was designed with fewer seats in order to meet the needs of some major United States airlines, which have an agreement with the pilots' union to limit the number of 50-seat aircraft that can be flown by their affiliates. At launch, Embraer estimated the cost of an ERJ140 to be approximately US$15.2 million. The estimated cost of development of the ERJ140 was US$45 million.

The ERJ 135 is 3.54 metres (11 ft 7 in) shorter, seating 37 passengers, and has 95% parts commonality with the ERJ145. The first ERJ 135 entered service in 1999.

== Design ==
The Embraer ERJ family is a series of twin-engine regional jets. The ERJ family retains a relatively high level of commonality with the Embraer Legacy 600 business jet; the principal difference being the addition of winglets and additional fuel tanks as standard on the latter. The airframe is composed of stretched, machined and chemically milled aluminium, with CFRP for moving parts, GFRP for fairings and sidewalls, kevlar for leading edges and Nomex honeycomb-CFRP/GFRP sandwiches for floors.

The EMB145 family is generally powered by a pair of Rolls-Royce AE 3007 series turbofan engines. Each engine has a bypass ratio of 5:1 and can generate up to 8,917 lbf of thrust. The engines are controlled by a dual Full Authority Digital Engine Controls (FADEC) arrangement, which is capable of controlling virtually all aspects of the engine and sending engine data to be displayed on the engine-indicating and crew-alerting system (EICAS) for the flight crew.

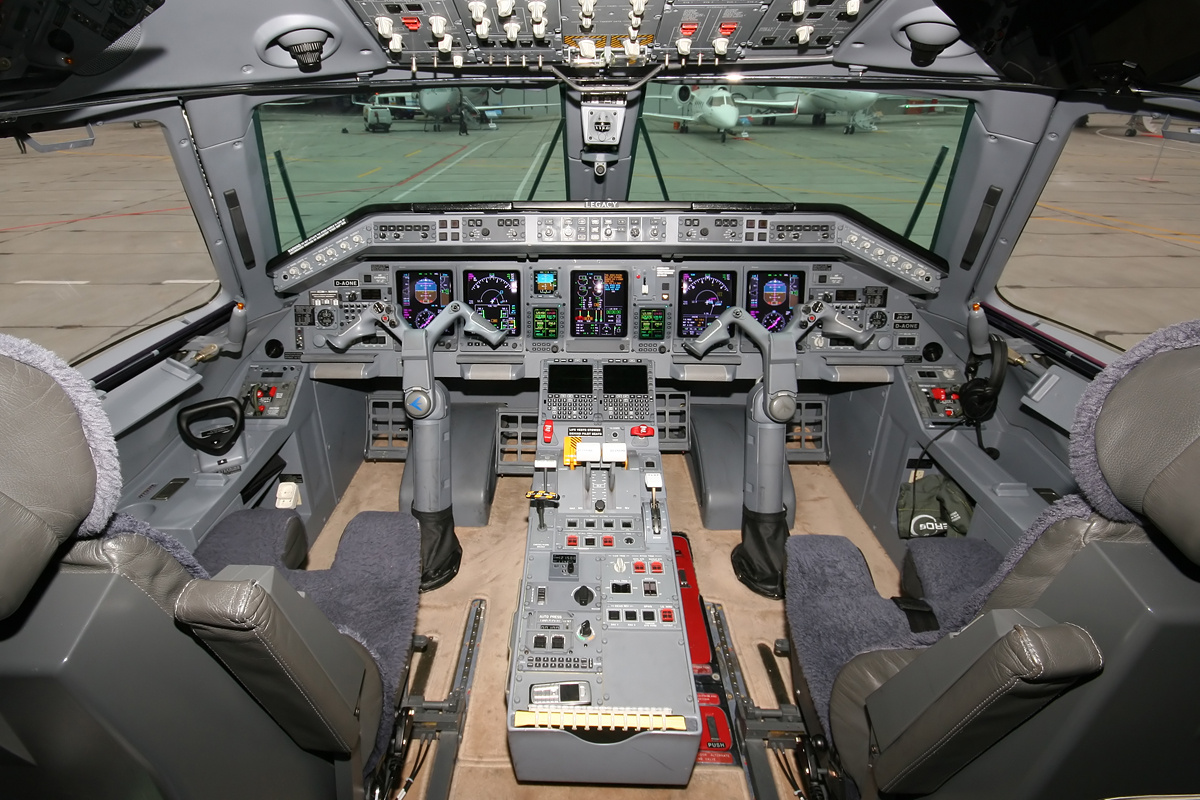
The flight deck of an Embraer EMB-135BJ, 2008

The ERJ 145 family initially shared its cockpit layout with that of the aborted CBA123. It is equipped with the Honeywell Primus 1000 avionics suite. This provides an electronic flight instrument system (EFIS) that comprises five monitors; from left to right, these consists of a Primary Flight Display (PFD), Multi-Function Display (MFD), Engine Indication and Crew Alerting System (EICAS), Multi-Function Display (MFD) (Co-pilot) and Primary Flight Display (PFD) (Co-pilot). While these are CRT displays as standard, they can be upgraded to LCD counterparts, which are lighter and have additional functionality.

In a typical commuter/airliner configuration, the ERJ 145 can accommodate up to 60 seats, although many operators would have fewer seats than this on their selected configuration. Embraer has offered a premium cabin configuration, which seats between 16 and 28 passengers in a more comfortable and spacious arrangement. The cabin can accommodate various interiors, these being customisable to fulfil each customer's own requirements. The fittings can be suited to various market sectors, from the relatively modest commuter to the more luxury-inclined VIP traveller. It is typical, but not compulsory, for ERJ 135/145 airliners to be configured with an offset aisle. Dependent on an individual aircraft's role, overhead bins may be installed; their exclusion gives more headroom but reduces the available storage space for carry-on luggage.

Embraer has stated that every ERJ 145 is capable of being converted into a semi-private aircraft configuration, and that the conversion process can be performed at Embraer-owned service centers. Numerous aftermarket companies have also offered their own conversions of ERJ family aircraft, often involving various levels of interior refurbishment, such as the installation of an expanded galley, redesigned lavatories, seat track relocation, at-seat power provision, Wi-Fi, alternative ceilings, LED lighting upgrades, and various storage options.

== Operational history ==
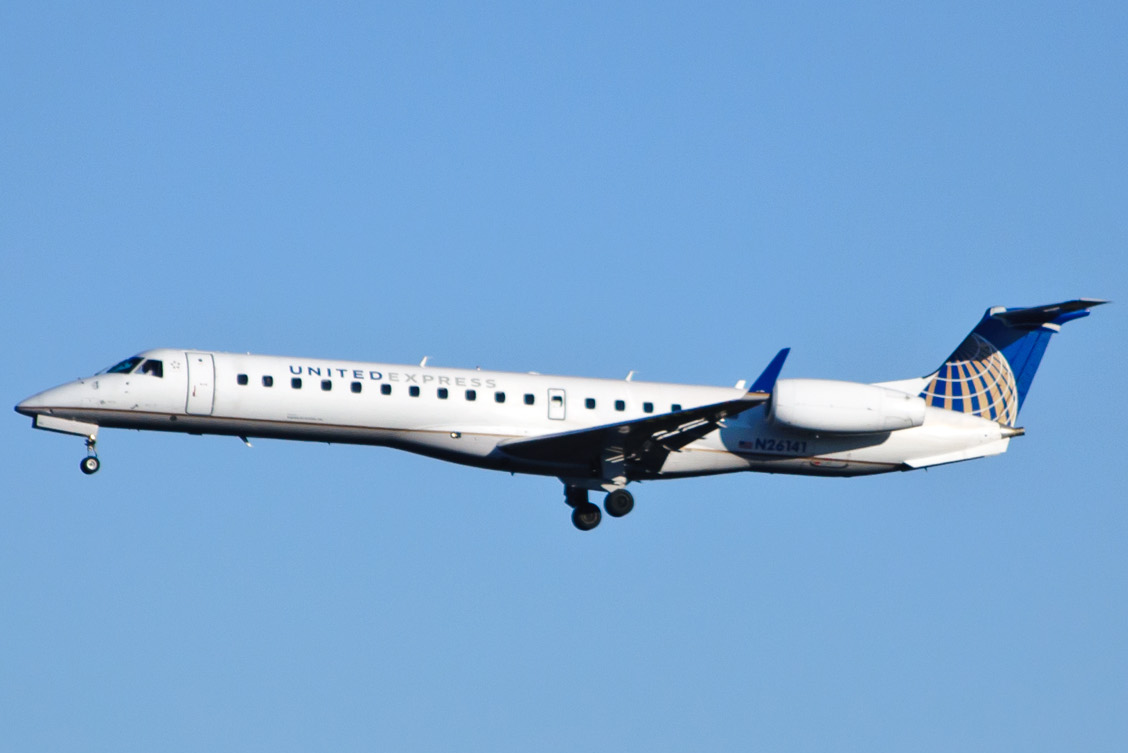
ERJ 145 operated for United Express by ExpressJet Airlines, 2013

In December 1996, the first delivery of the ERJ 145 was made to ExpressJet Airlines (then the regional division of Continental Airlines flying as Continental Express). As a newly established company, ExpressJet chose the ERJ 145 with which to launch its operations; this was achieved in April 1997, the same month that Embraer completed deliveries to the operator. Particular value was attached the American market as there was a near-insatiable hunger for regional aircraft at this time, and thus a substantial amount of potential sales to capitalise upon.

The ERJ 145 quickly entered service with various other operators throughout the Americas, being particularly popular on high-demand regional routes. However, the type proved to be less successful in the European market allegedly on account of logistical difficulties. Nonetheless, several European operators did emerge; LOT Polish Airlines operated as many as 14 ERJ145s, while British Regional Airlines also flew the type on behalf of the national flag carrier British Airways.

During the early 2000s, various governments opted to procure the ERJ 145 as dedicated transports for high-ranking officials, amongst some other purposes. One such country was Belgium, who operated a pair of ERJ145s for VIP transport, regularly carrying the Belgian prime minister, cabinet members, members of the royal family, or military officials, between 2001 and 2020.

By the 2020s, various operators had elected to retire their ERJ 145 fleets in favour of newer airliners; they have often been replaced by members of Embraer's E-Jet family. Aircraft formerly used as regional airliners have often been sold on to charter operators. To capitalise on the growing sector of corporate/private travellers, some customers have elected to acquire secondhand ERJ145s from regional operators and refurbishing them with new interiors with more luxurious fittings to suit their new role. As of August 2021, the largest operator of the ERJ 145 is CommuteAir, which serves as United Express under United Airlines, possessing a fleet of 165 aircraft.

During September 1999, the slightly smaller ERJ140 was introduced; it performing its first flight on 27 June 2000, and entering commercial service in July 2001. Envoy Air, the regional jet subsidiary of American Airlines flying as American Eagle, operated the majority of the ERJ140s built, including the first to be delivered (N800AE) However, Envoy Air opted to withdraw all of their ERJ140 fleet in mid-2020. By early 2005, 74 ERJ140s had been delivered; while this model has been marketed as ERJ140, its designation on the company's internal documents and on FAA certification is EMB 135KL. In March 2007, ExpressJet entered into a short-term agreement to operate some regional routes for JetBlue Airways using its ERJ 145 aircraft.

In May 2017, the ERJ 135 was leased $33,000 to $43,000 per month ($396,000 to $516,000 per year) and the ERJ 145 $38,000 to $55,000 per month ($456,000 to $660,000 per year).

== Variants ==
Aircraft lengths at the same scale

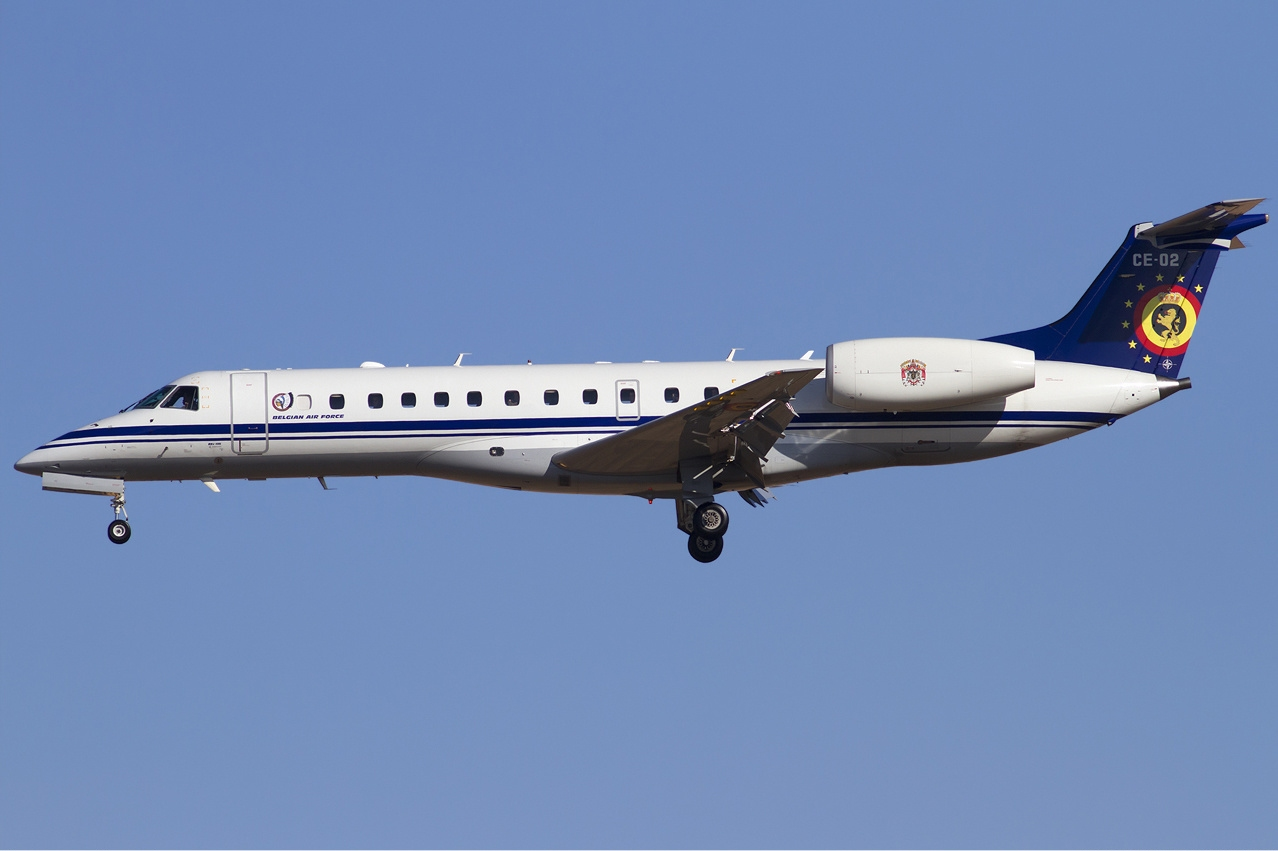
26.33 m-long (86.4 ft) ERJ 135

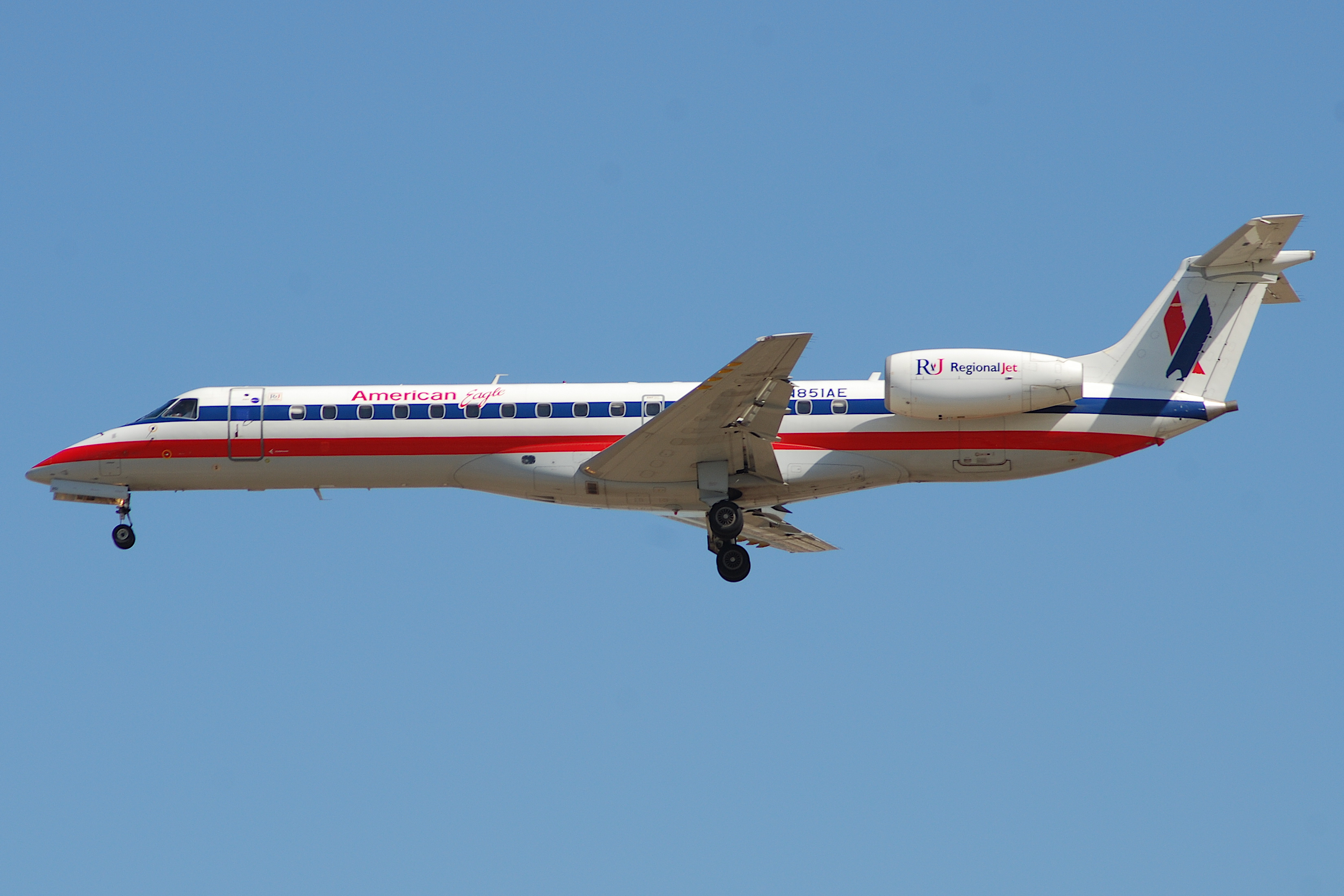
28.45 m-long (93.3 ft) ERJ 140

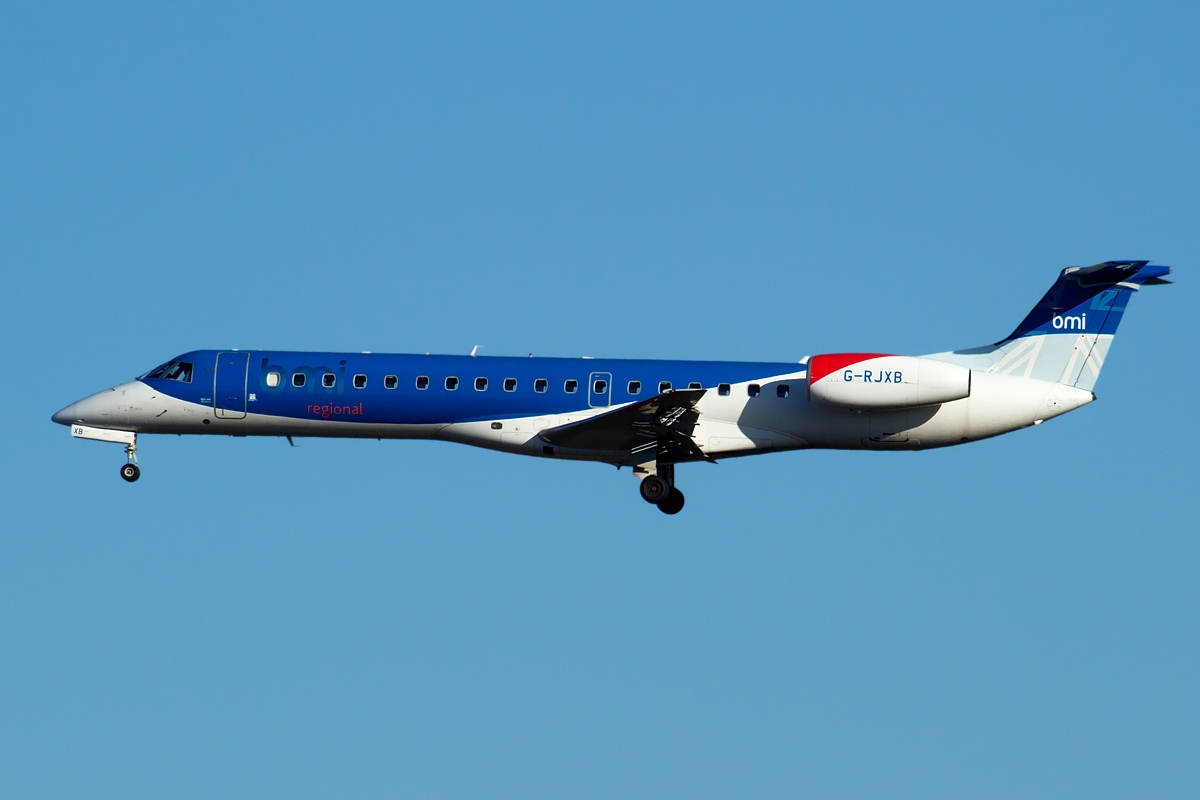
29.87 m-long (98.0 ft) ERJ 145

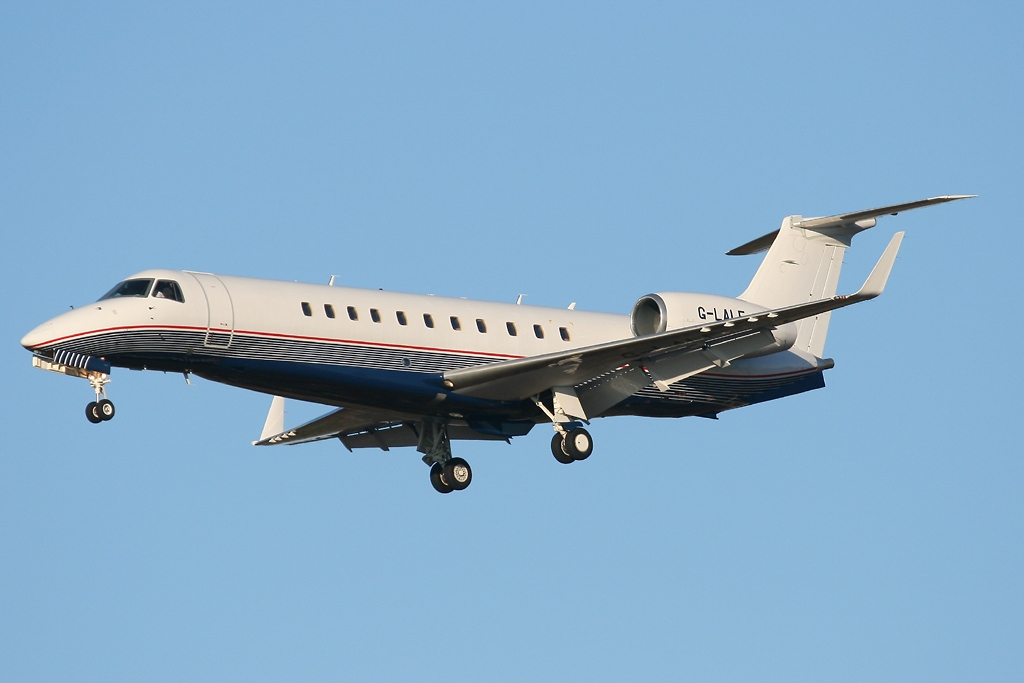
The Legacy 600 business jet derivative adds a fuel tank fairing forward of the wing and winglets.

=== Civilian models ===
- ERJ 135ER – Extended Range, although this is the baseline 135 model. Simple shrink of the ERJ145, seating thirteen fewer passengers, for a total of 37 passengers.
- ERJ 135LR – Long Range, increased fuel capacity and upgraded engines. Launch customer: Belgium Air Component.
- ERJ 140ER – Extended Range, although this is the baseline 140 model. Simple shrink of the ERJ145, seating six fewer passengers for a total of 44 passengers.
- ERJ 140LR – Long Range (increased fuel capacity (5,187 kg) and upgraded engines. Launch customer: American Eagle (Envoy).
- ERJ 145EU – Model optimized for the European market. Same fuel capacity as 145LR (4,174 kg) but a lower MTOW 19,990 kg
- ERJ 145ER – Extended Range, although this is the baseline 145 model with 50 seats. Launch customer: ExpressJet Airlines
- ERJ 145EP – Same fuel capacity as 145ER (4,174 kg) but an increased MTOW 20,990 kg. Launch customer: Flybmi.
- ERJ 145LI – Built in China – joint venture with Harbin Aircraft Manufacturing Corporation
- ERJ 145LR – Long Range – increased fuel capacity (5,187 kg) and upgraded engines.
- ERJ 145LU – Same fuel capacity as 145LR (5,187 kg) but an increased MTOW 21,990 kg. Launch customer: Luxair.
- ERJ 145MP – Updated version of the 145ER with increased MTOW, increased empty weight, and increased payload with same fuel capacity of the 145ER. Range also slightly increased by 30nm.
- ERJ 145XR – Extra-long Range, numerous aerodynamic improvements, including winglets, strakes, etc. for lower cruise-configuration drag; an aft ventral fuel tank in addition to the two main larger capacity wing tanks (same tanks as in the LR models); increased weight capacity; increased cruise from .78 mach to .80 mach. Launch customer: ExpressJet Airlines.
- Legacy 600 (EMB 135BJ) – Business jet variant based on the ERJ 135.
- Legacy 650 (EMB 135BJ) – Business jet variant based on the Legacy 600 with increased range.

The physical engines are the same (Rolls-Royce AE 3007), however, the FADEC (Full Authority Digital Engine/Electronic Control) logic is what differs between the various models in regards to total thrust capability.

The extended range version, the ERJ 145ER, has Rolls-Royce AE 3007A engines rated at 31.3 kN (7,036 lb) thrust, with the option of more powerful AE 3007A1 engines. A, A1, A1P models are mechanically identical but differ in thrust due to variations in FADEC software. The A1E engine, however, has not only new software, but significantly upgraded mechanical components.

The long-range ERJ 145LR aircraft is equipped with Rolls-Royce AE 3007A1 engines which provide 15% more power. The engines are flat rated at 33.1 kN (7,440 lb) thrust to provide improved climb characteristics and improved cruise performance in high ambient temperatures.

The extra-long-range ERJ 145XR aircraft is equipped with Rolls-Royce AE 3007A1E engines. The high performance engines provide lower specific fuel consumption (SFC) and improved performance in hot and high conditions. The engines also yield a higher altitude for one-engine-inoperable conditions."

Despite the multiple variants, pilots need only one type rating to fly any variant of the ERJ aircraft. Companies like American Eagle utilizes this benefit with its mixed fleet of ERJ 135ER/LR and ERJ145EP/LR/XR. Shared type-ratings allow operators to utilize a single pilot pool for any ERJ aircraft.

=== Military models ===
- C-99A – Transport model
- EMB 145SA (E-99A / E-99M) – Airborne Early Warning model
- EMB 145RS (R-99B) – Remote sensing model
- EMB 145MP/ASW (P-99) – Maritime patrol model
- EMB 145H (Hellenic Air Force) – Airborne Early Warning model
- EMB 145SM (Indian Air Force) – Airborne Early Warning model
- B.LL.2 (Royal Thai Navy) – (Thai: บ.ลล.๒) designation for the ERJ 135LR.

== Operators ==
=== Civilian operators ===
As of May 2025, the civilian operators with ten or more ERJs are:

- Piedmont Airlines: 61 (7 parked)
- CommuteAir: 53 (1 parked)
- JSX: 79 (31 parked)
- Airlink: 27
- Contour Airlines: 23 (4 parked)
- Loganair: 11 (1 parked)
- TAR Aerolíneas: 11 (8 parked)

=== Military operators ===
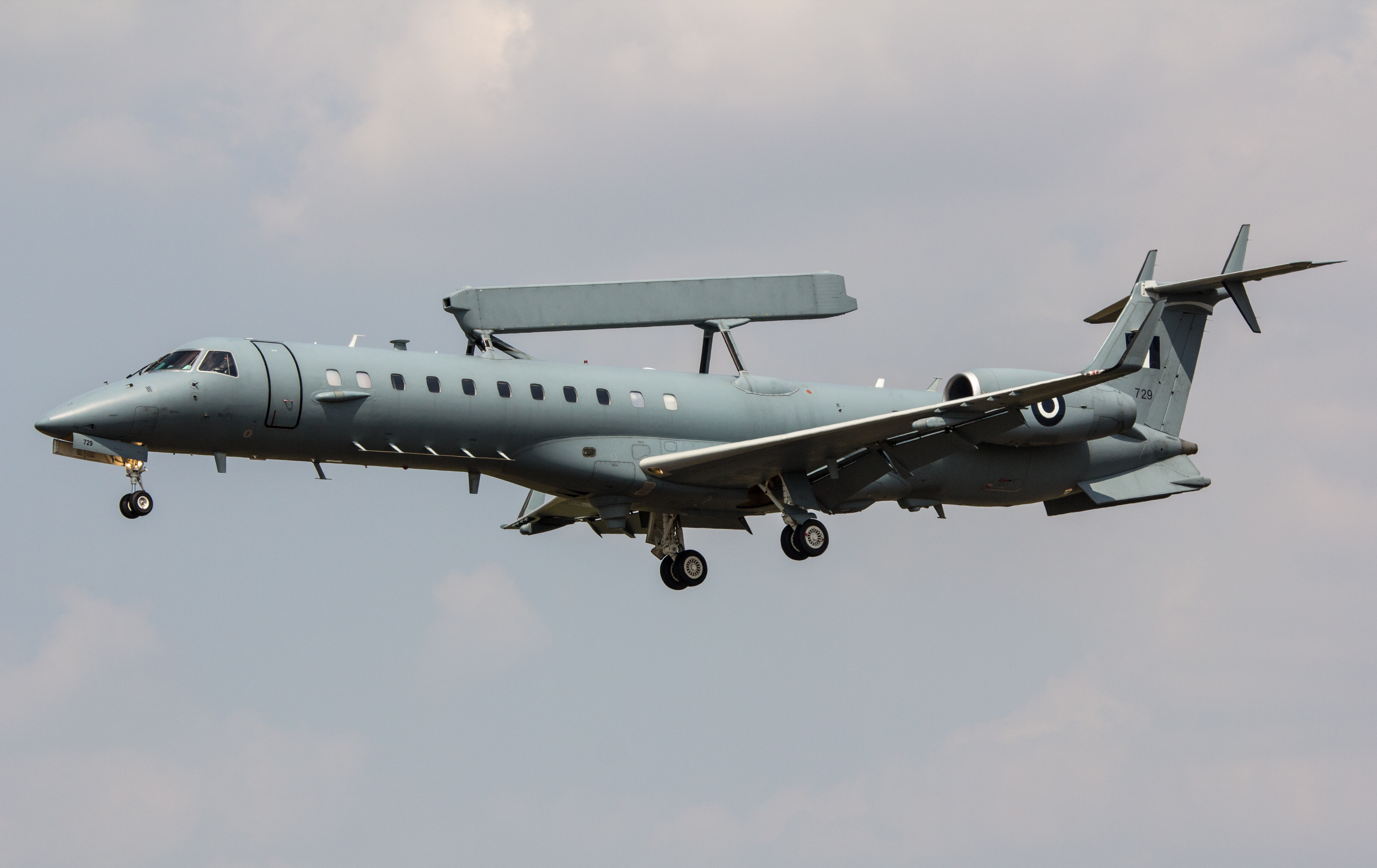
Erieye variant (R-99A) of the Hellenic Air Force with an AESA antenna on top for AEW&C

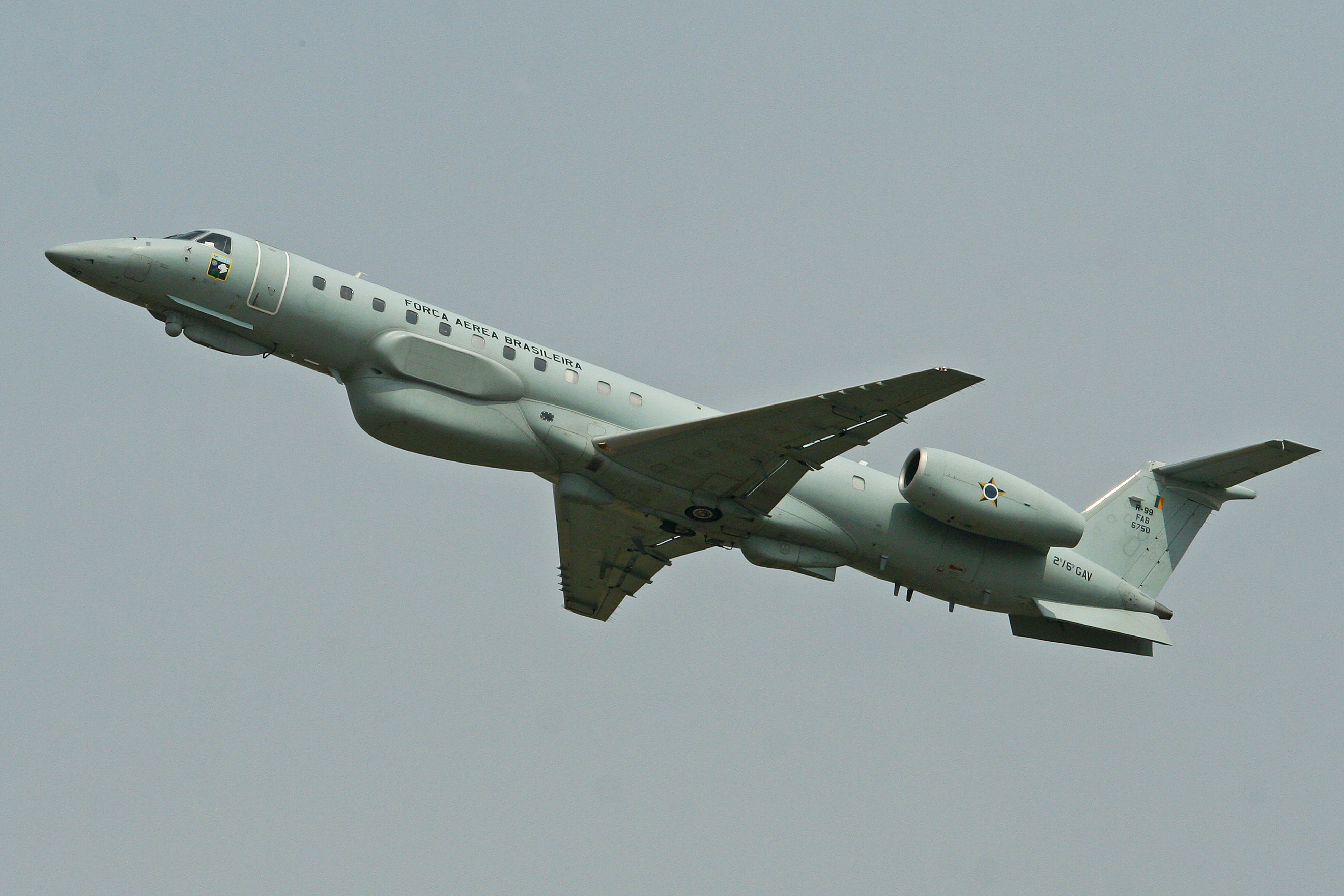
Embraer R-99B variant of the Força Aérea Brasileira with a synthetic aperture radar on the side

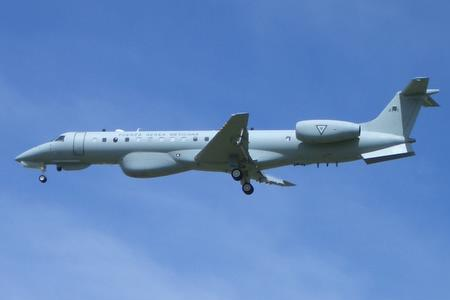
EMB 145 MPA maritime patrol version of the Fuerza Aérea Mexicana, without the R-99B side radar

Argentina

- Argentinean Air Force

Angola

- Angolan Air Force

Belgium

- Belgian Air Component (operated two ERJ 135 and two ERJ 145 between 2001 and 2020 in passenger transport and VIP roles)

Brazil

- Brazilian Air Force
- Brazil Federal Police

Colombia

- Colombian Air Force
- SATENA

Cyprus

- Cyprus Air Command

Ecuador

- Ecuadorian Air Force

Greece

- Hellenic Air Force

India

- Indian Air Force (Operates 4 Legacy 600s as VIP transport and 3 ERJ 145 as AEW&CS)
- Border Security Force

Mexico

- Mexican Air Force

Panama

- Panamanian Presidential Air Guard

Thailand

- Royal Thai Army
- Royal Thai Navy

== Accidents and incidents ==
The ERJ 135/140/145 has been involved in 26 aviation accidents and incidents, including 11 hull losses, which resulted in zero fatalities.

Hull loss accidents
Date	Variant	Operator	Location	Description
11 Feb 1998	ERJ 145	ExpressJet for Continental Express	Beaumont, Texas, United States (Jack Brooks Regional Airport)	Crashed on takeoff during a training flight: the left wing stalled after the incorrect application of rudder during a V1 cut maneuver.
28 Dec 1998	ERJ 145	Rio Sul Serviços Aéreos Regionais	Curitiba, Brazil (Afonso Pena International Airport)	Excessive descent rate upon landing, causing the fuselage to crack near the tail and drag along the runway.
18 Jan 2003	ERJ 135	American Eagle Airlines	Columbus, Ohio, United States (John Glenn Columbus International Airport)	Collided with hangar doors during an engine run-up test.
7 Dec 2009	ERJ 135	SA Airlink	George, South Africa (George Airport)	When landing in wet weather, the aircraft slid past the aerodrome's fence; the landing gear tyres had evidence of aquaplaning.
5 May 2010	ERJ 145	SATENA	Mitú, Colombia (Fabio Alberto León Bentley Airport)	Over ran runway. Suspected hydroplaning.
25 Aug 2010	ERJ 145	Passaredo Linhas Aéreas	Vitória da Conquista, Brazil (Glauber Rocha Airport)	Crash-landed on approach: touched-down short of the runway and stopped away from the runway.
28 Apr 2011	ERJ 145	Dniproavia	Moscow, Russia (Sheremetyevo International Airport)	Skidded off runway after attempted ground loop to slow down. Brake failure was suspected.
4 Sep 2011	ERJ 145	Trans States Airlines for United Express	Ottawa, Canada (Ottawa Macdonald–Cartier International Airport)	Slid off the runway upon landing.
4 Mar 2019	ERJ 145	CommuteAir for United Express	Presque Isle, Maine, United States (Presque Isle International Airport)	United Express Flight 4933 – pilots misidentified the runway in snow and did not abort the approach due to confirmation bias.
11 Nov 2019	ERJ 145	Envoy Air for American Eagle	Chicago, Illinois, United States (O'Hare International Airport)	Slid off the runway upon landing in icy conditions.
17 Nov 2025	ERJ 145	AirJet	Kolwezi, Democratic Republic of the Congo (Kolwezi Airport)	Airjet Angola Flight 100 – crashed while attempting to land; aircraft consumed by fire.

== Specifications ==
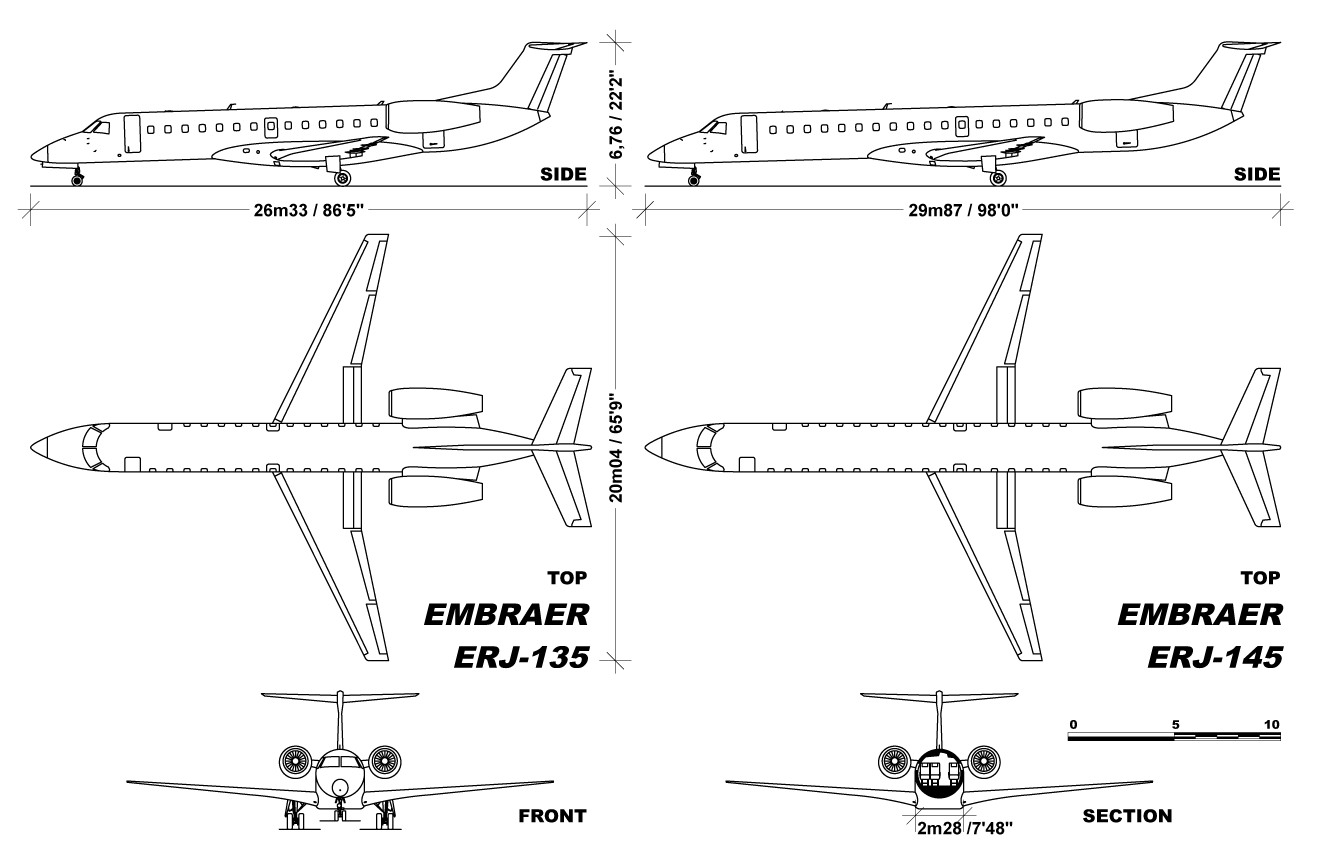
Line drawings of ERJ 135 and 145

Variant	ERJ 135LR	ERJ 140LR	ERJ 145XR
Cockpit crew	Two		
Seating	37	44	50
Length	26.34 m (86 ft 5 in)	28.45 m (93 ft 4 in)	29.87 m (98 ft 0 in)
Wing span	20.04 m (65 ft 9 in)		
Wing	51.18 m^{2} (550.9 sq ft) area, aspect ratio 7.9, supercritical airfoil		
Height	6.76 m (22 ft 2 in)		
MTOW	20,000 kg (44,000 lb)	21,100 kg (46,500 lb)	24,100 kg (53,100 lb)
BOW	11,501 kg (25,355 lb)	11,808 kg (26,032 lb)	12,591 kg (27,758 lb)
Max payload	4,499 kg (9,919 lb)	5,292 kg (11,667 lb)	5,909 kg (13,027 lb)
Fuel capacity	4,499 kg (9,919 lb)		5,973 kg (13,168 lb)
Engines (2x)	AE 3007-A1/3		AE 3007-A1E
Takeoff Thrust	33.71 kN (7,580 lbf)		39.67 kN (8,917 lbf)
Maximum cruise	Mach 0.78 (449 kn; 831 km/h; 516 mph)		Mach 0.8 (460 kn; 852 km/h; 530 mph)
Service ceiling	37,000 ft (11,000 m) (Note: 6,100 m (20,013 ft) on one engine)		
Range	1,750 nmi (3,240 km; 2,010 mi)	1,650 nmi (3,060 km; 1,900 mi)	2,000 nmi (3,700 km; 2,300 mi)

Avionics

- Primus 1000 colour weather radar
- Dual digital ADCs
- Dual AHRS
- TCAS and GPWS standard with FMS/GPS optional
- HUD for Cat III landing from 2000

== See also ==
Related development

- Embraer EMB 120 Brasilia
- Embraer Legacy 600
- Embraer R-99 and P-99

Aircraft of comparable role, configuration, and era

- Bombardier CRJ100/200
- Fairchild Dornier 328JET
- VFW-Fokker 614
- Yakovlev Yak-40
- Embraer E-Jet family

Related lists

- List of jet airliners
- List of civil aircraft

== Sources ==
- Crane, Keith., Jill E. Luoto, Scott Warren Harold, David Yang, Samuel K. Berkowitz, and Xiao Wang. "The Effectiveness of China's Industrial Policies in Commercial Aviation Manufacturing". Rand Corporation, 2014. ISBN 0-8330-8584-0.
- Eden, Paul E. "The World's Most Powerful Civilian Aircraft." Rosen Publishing Group, 2016. ISBN 1-4994-6589-0.
