= PT-ZBA =

Preserved Embraer EMB-120 aircraft

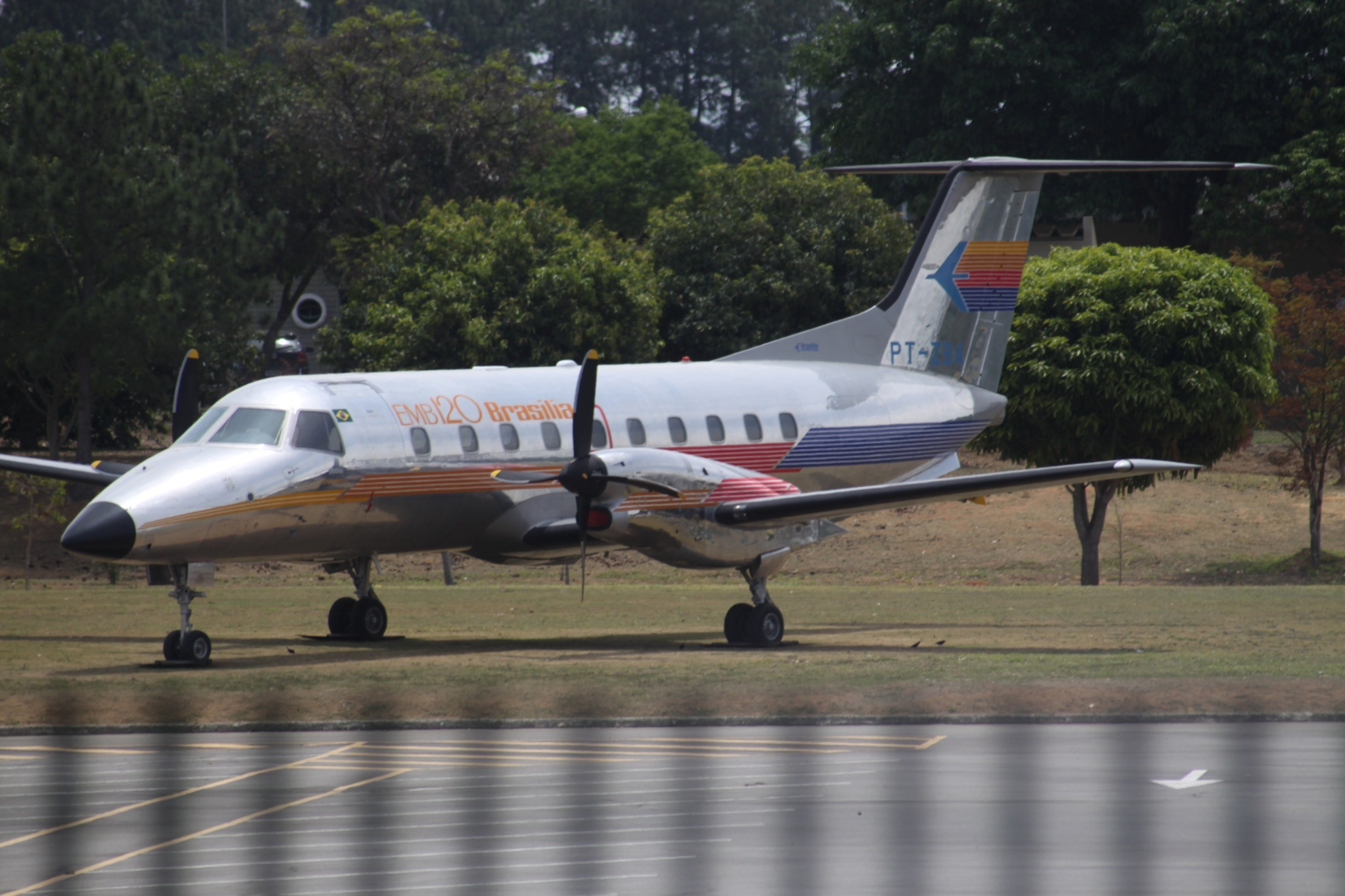

General information
- Type: Embraer EMB 120 Brasilia
- Manufacturer: Embraer
- Service: 1983-2003
- Registration: PT-ZBA
- Serial: 120001

History
- Manufactured: 1983
- First flight: July 27th, 1983
- Last flight: 2003
- Preserved at: São José dos Campos Airport at São José dos Campos, São Paulo, Brazil
- Fate: On static display

PT-ZBA was a Embraer EMB-120 Brasilia that was built by Embraer as the prototype of the EMB-120 and the very first example of the EMB-120.

== History ==
=== Construction and first flight ===
The PT-ZBA took its maiden flight on July 27th, 1983. The Embraer EMB-120 Brasilia was designed as a regional turboprop aircraft, capable of carrying passengers and cargo efficiently. The airliner was used only by Embraer as a demonstrator of the EMB-120 and was never used by any other airline. Throughout its life, the aircraft utilized two PWC PW118 engines.

=== Brasília series ===
Following the successful testing and certification of the prototype, production of the Embraer EMB-120 Brasilia series began in 1985. These aircraft were widely used for regional transport, connecting smaller cities and towns. The production of the Embraer EMB-120 Brasilia officially came to an end in 2001.

=== Preservation ===
The aircraft was retired from active service by Embraer and placed into storage at São José dos Campos in 2003. As of today, PT-ZBA is preserved at São José dos Campos Airport and the Embraer plant.
