= Embraer EMB 120 Brasilia =

Commuter airliner by Embraer

EMB 120 Brasilia
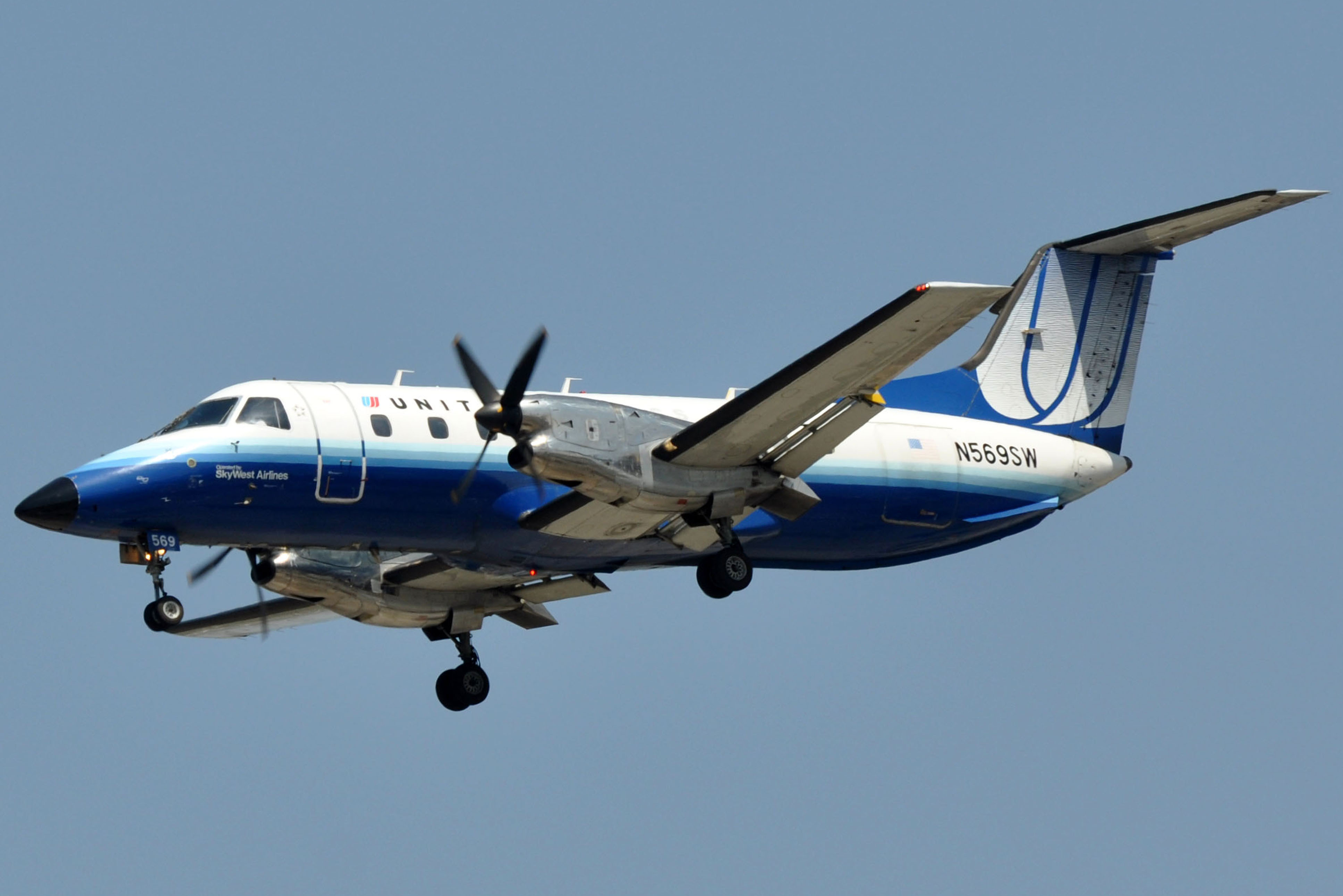
- United Express operated by SkyWest

General information
- Type: Turboprop regional airliner
- National origin: Brazil
- Manufacturer: Embraer
- Status: In service
- Primary users: Brazilian Air Force Ameriflight; Swiftair (Former); InterCaribbean Airways
- Number built: 727 105 (passenger service)

History
- Manufactured: 1983–2001
- Introduction date: October 1985
- First flight: 27 July 1983
- Developed into: Embraer/FMA CBA 123 Vector; Embraer ERJ family

The Embraer EMB 120 Brasilia is a twin-turboprop 30-passenger commuter airliner designed and manufactured by the Brazilian aircraft manufacturer Embraer.

The EMB 120 began development in 1974. While initially conceived as a modular series of aircraft, the Family 12X, referred to as the Araguaia, was intended to achieve a high level of commonality with the EMB 121 Xingu. However, the aircraft was redesigned and relaunched with the Brasilia name scheme during 1979. The redesign, which drew on operator feedback, reduced the seating capacity somewhat while removing commonality with the EMB 121. Its size, speed, and ceiling enabled faster and more direct services to be flown in comparison to similar aircraft. The EMB 120 features a circular cross-section fuselage, low-mounted straight wings, and a T-tail.

On 27 July 1983, the prototype performed its maiden flight. During October 1985, the first EMB 120 entered service with Atlantic Southeast Airlines; it quickly entered service with numerous regional airlines, particularly those in the lucrative US market. While the majority of sales were made to civilian operators, a few military customers were also garnered for the type; a specialised VIP transport version, the VC-97, was operated by the Brazilian Air Force. Numerous models were developed to fulfil differing roles and requirements; these included the flexible EMB120 Convertible and the extended range EMB120ER. In 2001, production of the EMB 120 was terminated; it was the last turboprop-powered airliner produced by Embraer.

== Design and development ==
=== Background ===
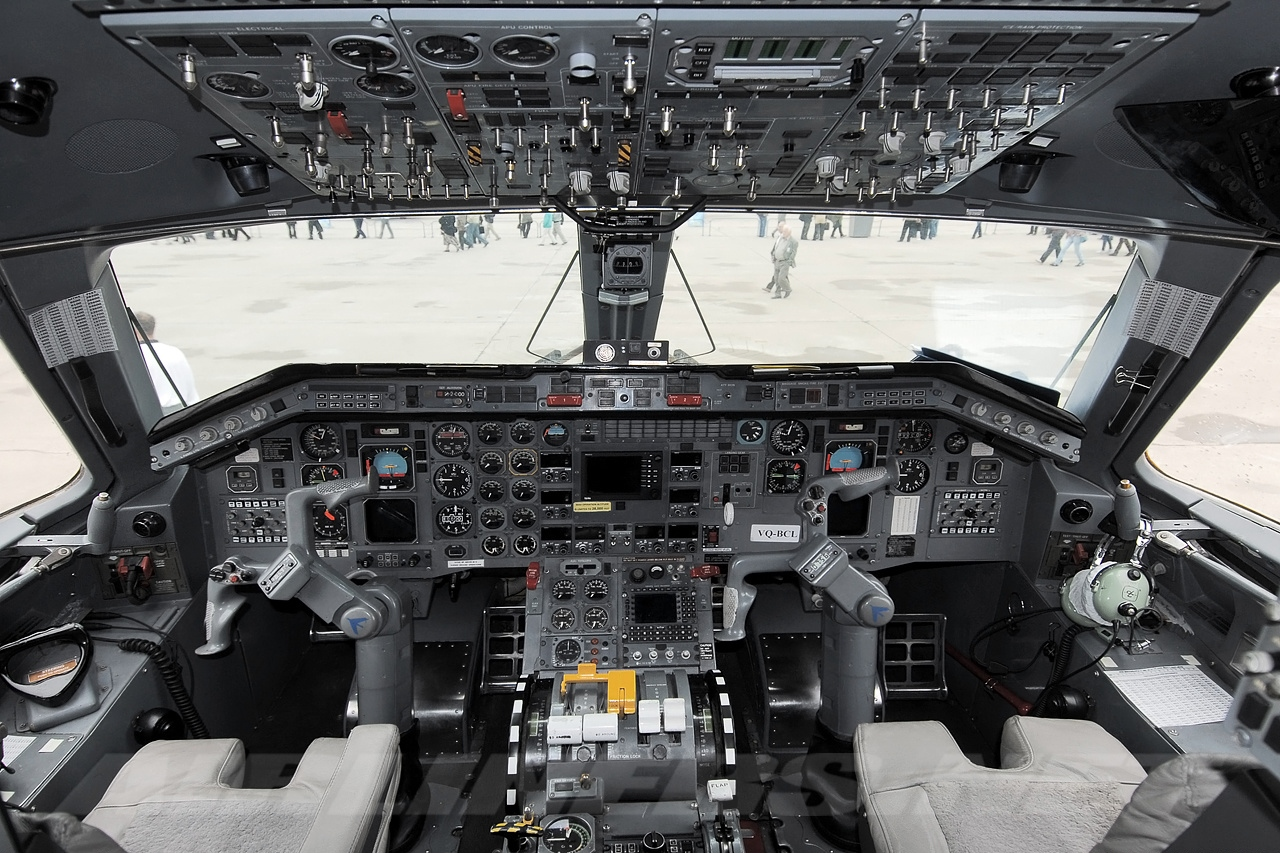
The cockpit of an EMB 120 (non-glass cockpit)

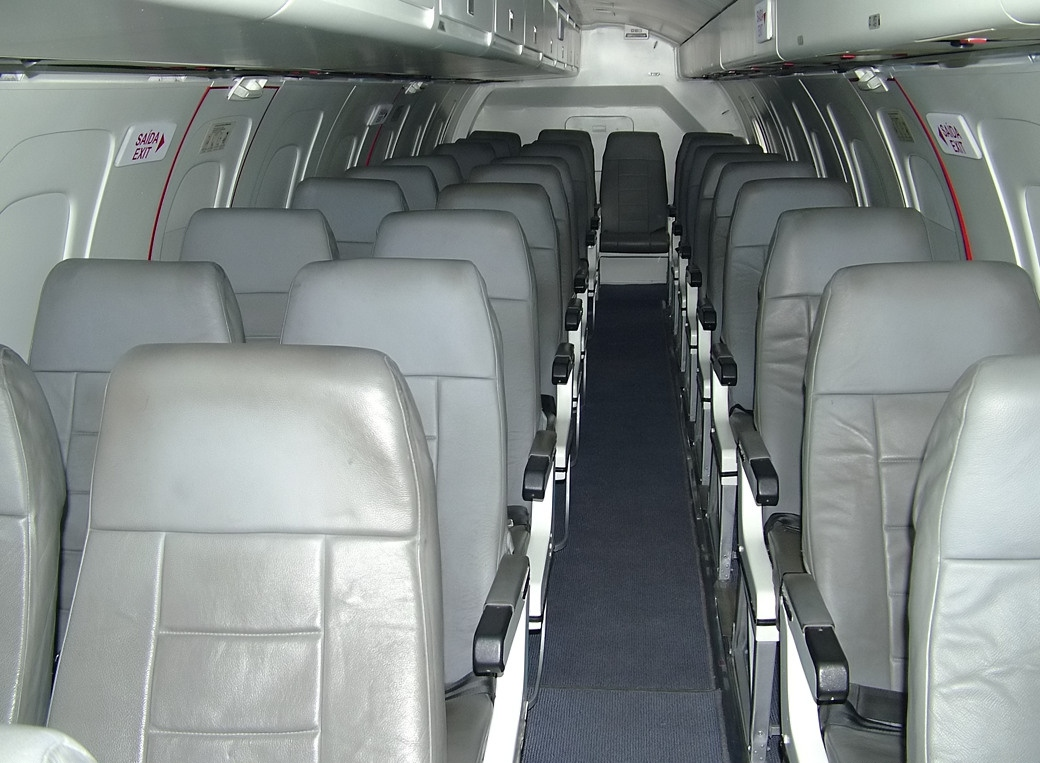
Three-abreast cabin

Following the success of the EMB 110 Bandeirante, Embraer began developing its first transport category airliner in 1974. At one point, this culminated in the Family 12X, which comprised three models with a modular design concept: EMB 120 Araguaia, EMB 123 Tapajós and EMB 121 Xingu. The original concept for the EMB 120 would have been a relatively straightforward stretch of the EMB 121, facilitating a high degree of commonality between the two types. However, the EMB 121 would be the sole 12X model that was actually produced in its original form; the EMB 120 would be redesigned during 1979, disposing of the Araguaia name at the same time.

At the official launching of the project, held in 1979, the name Brasilia was first applied to the EMB 120. Reportedly, the concept had been heavily revised on the basis of suggestions that had been gathered from prospective operators attending Commuter Airline Association of America (CAAA) convention, and the renaming was to reflect the level of alteration to the EMB 120. Being a completely new aircraft, it was no longer related to the 12X family, and had effectively no parts in common with the EMB 121 Xingu. Furthermore, the capacity was revised downwards from 30 to 24 seats. It had originally been designed to be powered by a pair of Pratt & Whitney Canada PW115 turboprop engine, which was capable of 1,500 shp, the aircraft was subsequently redesigned to make use of more powerful PW118 engines, which produced up to 1,892 shp.

In terms of its basic configuration, the EMB 120 features a circular cross-section fuselage, low-mounted straight wings and has a T-tail. The fuselage is of semi-monocoque design, its skin being composed of an aluminium alloy. The wing structure comprises a single three-spar design that is linked to the frames of the lower side of the fuselage, while the nose cone, dorsal fin and leading edges of the wing and tailplane primarily comprise a Kevlar-reinforced glass fibre. The EMB 120 is equipped with retractable tricycle landing gear, which is actuated hydraulically. It is fitted with Goodrich-supplied wheels, oleo-pneumatic shock absorbers, a Hydro Aire anti-skid system, and either carbon or steel brakes.

=== Into flight ===
On 27 July 1983, the PW115-powered EMB 120 prototype performed its maiden flight. The type was able to rapidly attract interest from numerous regional airlines, particularly those based in the United States. Its size, speed, and ceiling enable faster and more direct services to be flown around the US and Europe in comparison to similar aircraft. During October 1985, the first aircraft entered service with Atlantic Southeast Airlines.

Numerous models would be developed to suit different operational circumstances; the EMB120RT featured a reduced take off weight, while the EMB120 cargo freighter had an elevated payload capacity of 4,000 kg; the EMB120 Combi and EMB120 Convertible emphasised flexible operations. During 1993, the first deliveries of the EMB120ER, an extended range model, took place; it was thereafter adopted as the standard production model. Furthermore, hot-and-high versions of these models were commonly equipped with PW118A engines that retain their power ratings at a higher altitude. The EMB120ER Advanced incorporates a range of external and interior improvements in comparison to most other models. The EMB 120RT could be upgraded to the EMB 120 ER; older aircraft were retrofitted to this standard via a Service Bulletin.

During 2001, production of the EMB 120 was terminated. As of 2021, Embraer has not manufactured a turboprop-powered successor, although company executives have occasionally hinted at there being interest in doing so at some point.

== Operational history ==
The majority of the EMB 120s were sold in the United States and other countries across the Western Hemisphere. US airlines operating the type have included Great Lakes Airlines, which had six EMB 120s in its fleet, while Ameriflight was flying ten freighter-configured EMB 120s as late as 2022. The largest operator of the type in the United States was SkyWest Airlines, which operated more than 62 at one point in its history (c. 2006). SkyWest retired the fleet in early 2015. Several European airlines, such as Régional in France, Atlant-Soyuz Airlines in Russia, DAT in Belgium, and DLT in Germany, also purchased EMB 120s.

The EMB 120 has also proven itself to be popular amongst African operators. One of the biggest operators in the region was the charter operator Sahara African Aviation, which had flown as many as nine EMB 120ERs. Into the 2020s, numerous airlines have opted to retain a handful of examples in their active fleet. It has been commonly contrasted against the ubiquitous Douglas DC-3, often being used as a more modern substitute for the aging classic and possessing roughly double the speed.

Several military operators also procured the type, such as the Angolan Air Force, which received new-build aircraft during 2007. A specialised VIP transport version, the VC-97, was produced and procured by the Brazilian Air Force.

== Variants ==
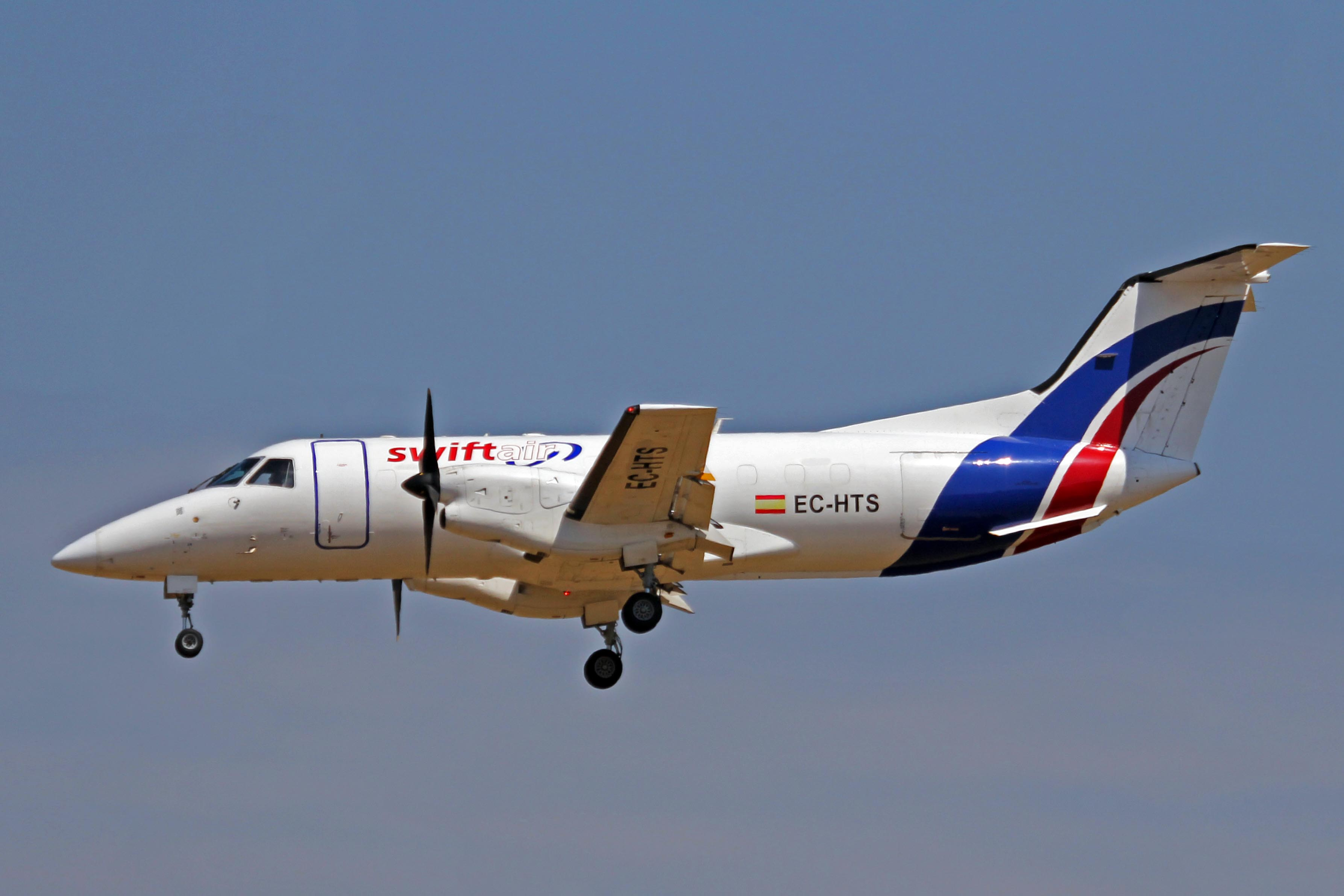
A Swiftair Cargo EMB 120

EMB 120
Basic production version.
EMB 120ER
Extended range and increased capacity version. All EMB 120ER S/Ns may be converted into the EMB 120FC or EMB 120QC models if desired.
EMB 120FC
Full cargo version.
EMB 120QC
Quick change cargo version.
EMB 120RT
Transport version. All EMB-120RT S/Ns may be converted into the model EMB-120ER.
VC-97
VIP transport version for the Brazilian Air Force.

== Operators ==
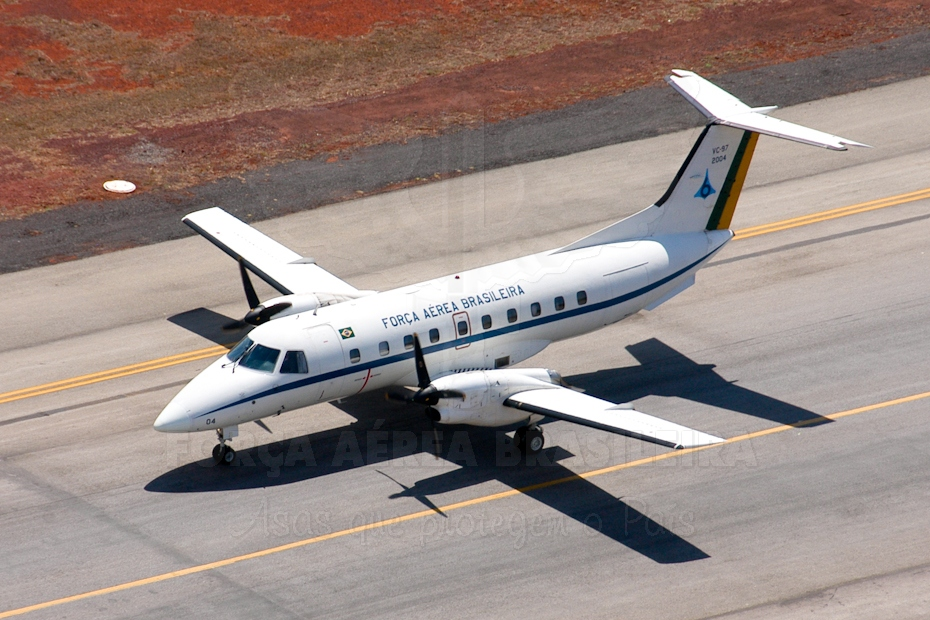
Brazilian Air Force EMB 120

=== Civil operators ===
As of July 2018, 105 Brasilias were in airline service: 45 in North/South America, 26 in Africa, 14 in Europe and 20 in Asia-Pacific, with major operators:

- As Salaam Air (2 passenger)
- Ameriflight (16 freighters)
- Swiftair Hellas (5 freighters)
- Freight Runners Express (9 passenger and freighters)
- Airnorth (7)
- InterCaribbean Airways (7)
- Skippers Aviation, Freedom Airlines Express (6)
- Berry Aviation (9) (freighters, on demand cargo)
- Budapest Aircraft Service (4)
- Allegiance Air (2)
- Sahara African Aviation (18)
- Flight West Airlines Australia (9)

=== Military operators ===
Brazil

- Brazilian Air Force - 20 transports

Uruguay

- Uruguayan Air Force - 2 transports

=== Former operators ===
- Skywest Airlines - Retired 2015 (Operated the aircraft on behalf of Delta Air Lines and United Airlines as Delta Connection and United Express)

== Accidents and incidents ==
- On 19 September 1986, an Atlantic Southeast Airlines EMB 120RT (N219AS) struck a mountain near Mantiqueira, Brazil while being delivered to Atlantic Southeast, killing all five on board.
- On 21 December 1987, Air Littoral Flight 1919 crashed into trees during approach to the wrong runway at Bordeaux–Mérignac Airport (South-West of France). All 16 occupants died.
- On 8 July 1988, Brazilian Air Force EMB 120RT Brasília FAB-2001 crashed during an engine-out landing at São José dos Campos. Five of the nine occupants died.
- On 9 April 1990, Atlantic Southeast Airlines Flight 2254, was involved in a mid-air collision with Cessna 172, operating by Civil Air Patrol, over Gadsden. All 7 people on board EMB 120 survived, but both people on board Cessna died.
- On 5 April 1991, Atlantic Southeast Airlines Flight 2311, operating for Delta Connection, crashed on approach to Glynco Jetport in Brunswick, Georgia. The crash claimed the lives of all twenty-three people on board, including former U.S. Senator John Tower of Texas and astronaut Sonny Carter. This was due to propeller control failure which led to incorrect propeller blade angles.
- On 11 September 1991, Continental Express Flight 2574 broke up in flight and crashed at Eagle Lake, Texas, killing all 14 passengers and crew members on board. The NTSB determined that missing screws on the horizontal stabilizer led to part of it detaching from the aircraft.
- On 21 August 1995, one of the blades on Atlantic Southeast Airlines Flight 529's number-one propeller sheared off, partly tearing the left engine from its mount and increasing drag on the left side. It crashed in a field near Carrollton, Georgia. Of the twenty-nine people on board, ten of them died (one casualty was from a heart attack nearly eight weeks after the accident).
- On 9 January 1997, Comair Flight 3272 crashed in Monroe, Michigan. All of the 29 passengers and crew died. The probable cause was in-flight icing.
- On 21 May 1997, SkyWest Airlines Flight 724, an EMB 120 (N198SW), experienced a total loss of engine power to the right engine and associated engine fire, followed by a total loss of all airplane hydraulic systems, after takeoff from San Diego International-Lindbergh Field, San Diego, California. The airplane sustained substantial damage. The two pilots, one flight attendant, and 14 passengers were not injured. The flight was destined for Los Angeles, California. It diverted to NAS Miramar, San Diego, where it landed at 14:27 hrs.
- On 21 October 1998, a Capital Táxi Aéreo EMB 120RT Brasilia registration PT-WKH crashed due to pilot error during final approach to Pinto Martins International Airport. The two-man crew and one passenger on board were killed, along with one person on the ground. Seven more people were injured.
- On 14 January 2002, Ibertrans Aérea Flight 1278 crashed onto the Santa María Vieja mountain, Zaldivar. All 3 people on board were killed.
- On 30 August 2002, Rico Linhas Aéreas Flight 4823 operated by an EMB 120ER Brasília (registration PT-WRQ), en route from Cruzeiro do Sul and Tarauacá to Rio Branco crashed on approach to Rio Branco during a rainstorm, 1,5 km short of the runway. Of the 31 passengers and crew aboard, 23 died.
- On 14 May 2004, Rico Linhas Aéreas Flight 4815 operated by an EMB 120ER Brasília (registration PT-WRO), en route from São Paulo de Olivença and Tefé to Manaus, crashed in the forest about 18 nmi (33 km; 21 mi) from Manaus. All 33 passengers and crew died in the deadliest accident involving the EMB 120.
- On 26 May 2007, Skywest Airlines Flight 5741 nearly collided with Republic Airways Flight 4912, a Embraer E-170, at the intersection of runway 01L and 28R at San Francisco International Airport. All 27 people on board both aircraft survived.
- On 22 March 2010, an Airnorth EMB 120 (VH-ANB) took off approximately 10.10am (ACST) from Darwin International Airport on a routine simulated engine-failure training exercise known as a V1 cut when it apparently banked sharply to the left and crashed into the nearby bushland at RAAF Base Darwin. The two pilots on board were killed instantly.
- On 14 September 2011, Angolan Air Force EMB 120ER T-500 crashed while attempting to take off from Huambo Airport, killing 17 of 23 people on board.
- On 12 October 2011, a Nationale Regionale Transport EMB 120, registered as ZS-PYO, performing a charter flight from Libreville to Port Gentil (Gabon) overran runway 21 and came to a stop with the nose gear intact, both main gear struts bent backwards causing the engines to "pitch down" together with the wings. A few passengers sustained minor injuries, but the aircraft was damaged beyond repair and was written off.
- On 27 November 2012, an Inter Îles Air EMB 120ER Brasilia (registration number D6-HUA) was underway from Moroni to Anjouan (both in Comoros Islands) on a charter flight with 25 passengers and 4 crew, when after taking off from Moroni's Prince Said Ibrahim International Airport it lost height, and while attempting to return to the airport, waterlanded 200 m (660 ft) off the coast, about 5 km north of the airport. Local fishermen rescued everybody on board. There were only minor injuries, but the aircraft was damaged beyond repair and was written off.
- On 3 October 2013, Associated Aviation Flight 361, an EMB 120RT (5N-BJY), was involved in a crash on takeoff from Lagos Airport bound for Akure. The aircraft was on a charter flight taking the body of the former Governor of Ondo State, Dr. Olusegun Agagu, for burial. There were at least 16 reported fatalities amongst passengers travelling in the burial party. Two people who survived the crash died later in hospital.
- On 12 October 2017, an Air Guicango EMB-120 (D2-FDO) crashed en route from Dundo to Luanda (both in Angola). Crew declared engine failure and fire prior to losing radio contact. The wreckage was located the following day with no survivors.
- On 4 May 2020, an African Express Airways EMB 120 (5Y-AXO), operating a flight to Baidoa from Mogadishu, was reportedly shot down by a rocket in Somalia. This aircraft was carrying medical aids to fight COVID-19. A total of six people on board died after crash landing near Bardale.
- On 11 July 2023, a Halla Airlines EMB-120 (6O-AAD), operating a domestic flight from Garowe to Mogadishu, crashed into a fence at Aden Adde International Airport, while attempting to land on runway 05, after suffering a left landing gear collapse and veering off the runway. All 34 people on board survived. Preliminary data indicated that the pilots lost control of the aircraft after landing due to strong tailwinds and wind shear which caused the left gear to collapse.

== Aircraft on display ==
- PT-ZBA 120001 - Brasília's first prototype, preserved at the Brazilian Airspace Memorial at the entrance of São José dos Campos airport and Embraer plant.

== Specifications (EMB 120) ==
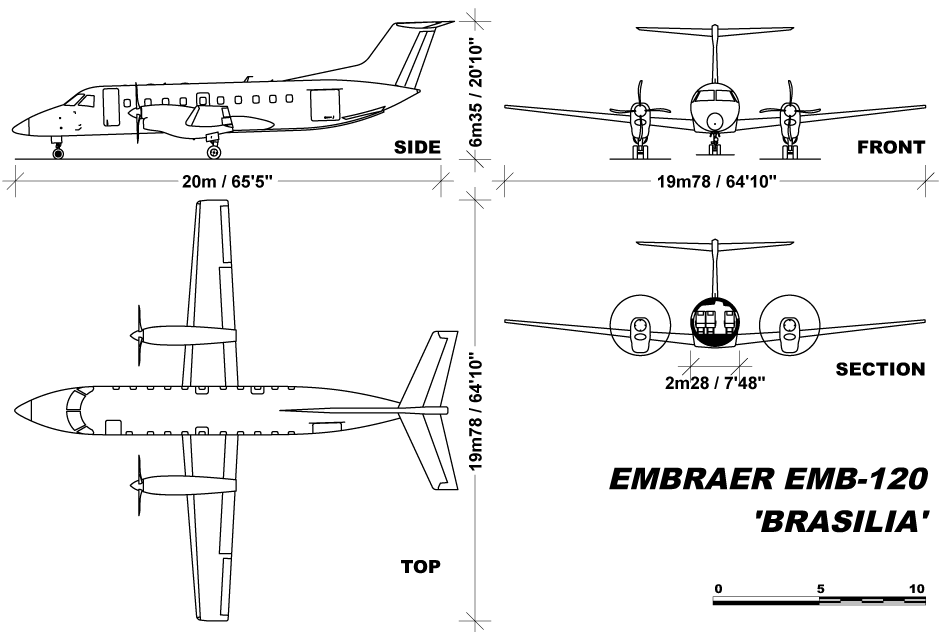

Data from Jane's All The World's Aircraft 1988-89

General characteristics

- Crew: 2 pilots and 1 flight attendant
- Capacity: 30-36 passengers
- Length: 20 m (65 ft 7 in)
- Wingspan: 19.78 m (64 ft 11 in)
- Height: 6.35 m (20 ft 10 in)
- Wing area: 39.4 m^{2} (424 sq ft)
- Airfoil: root: NACA 23018 mod.; tip: NACA 23012
- Empty weight: 7,070 kg (15,587 lb)
- Max takeoff weight: 11,500 kg (25,353 lb)
- Powerplant: 2 × Pratt & Whitney Canada PW118, PW118A or PW118B turboprop engines, 1,340 kW (1,800 hp) each
- Powerplant: 1 × Garrett, GTCP36-150 or Sundstrand Turbomach T-62T-40C7E1 Auxiliary Power Unit (APU)
- Propellers: 4-bladed Hamilton Standard 14RF19 constant-speed, fully-feathering

Performance

- Maximum speed: 608 km/h (378 mph, 328 kn) at 6,100 m (20,000 ft)
- Cruise speed: 552 km/h (343 mph, 298 kn)
- Stall speed: 162 km/h (101 mph, 87 kn) (flaps down) (CAS)
- Range: 1,750 km (1,090 mi, 940 nmi) (30 passengers, reserves for 185 km (115 mi; 100 nmi) divert and 45 minute hold)
- Service ceiling: 9,085 m (29,800 ft)
- Take-off run: 1,420 m (4,660 ft)

Avionics

- Collins analog Flight Instrument System or Collins five-screen Electronic Flight Instrument System or Bendix five-screen Electronic Flight Instrument System
- Dual autopilots

== See also ==
Related development

- Embraer EMB 110 Bandeirante
- Embraer EMB 121 Xingu
- Embraer/FMA CBA 123 Vector
- Embraer ERJ family
- PT-ZBA

Aircraft of comparable role, configuration, and era

- British Aerospace Jetstream 41
- De Havilland Canada Dash 8 100/200
- Dornier 328
- Saab 340

== Sources ==
- Taylor, John W. R., ed. (1988). Jane's All the World's Aircraft 1988–89. Coulsdon, UK: Jane's Information Group. ISBN 0-7106-0867-5.
- Thisdell, Dan; Morris, Rob (21 August – 3 September 2018). "World Airliner Census". Flight International. pp. 24–47. ISSN 0015-3710.
- Embraer, S.A., ed. (1987). EMB120 AFM (AFM-120/813 Revision 92 14/11/2019). AV. BRIGADEIRO FARIA LIMA, 2.170 – SÃO JOSÉ DOS CAMPOS - SÃO PAULO - BRASIL: Embraer S.A.
- Embraer, S.A., ed. (1985). EMB120 OM (OM-120BAS/625 Revision 48 20/12/2012). AV. BRIGADEIRO FARIA LIMA, 2.170 – SÃO JOSÉ DOS CAMPOS - SÃO PAULO - BRASIL: Embraer S.A.
