= AirJet Exploração Aérea de Carga =

Cargo airline from Angola

AirJet Angola
IATA	ICAO	Call sign
-	MBC	MABECO
- Founded: 2003; Angola
- Fleet size: 3

AirJet Exploração Aérea de Carga (a.k.a. AirJet Angola) is an airline based in Angola. It was established in 2003 and operates 3 aircraft. AirJet joined the JetVision Holdings (South Africa) on 1 May 2019 as an airline partner. AirJet's head offices are located in Luanda, Angola and Pretoria, South Africa. It is banned in EU airspace like most other Angolan airlines.

== Accidents and incidents ==
On November 17, 2025, an Embraer ERJ 145LR, registration D2-AJB, operating flight MBC100 suffered a runway excursion accident during its landing on runway 29 at Kolwezi Airport in the Democratic Republic of the Congo while operating a charter flight. After touching down extremely late, the landing gear collapsed and the aircraft veered to the left and skidded off the runway. All passengers and crew were evacuated safely. The aircraft was partly consumed by fire and written off. The regional jet was coming back from a mine that collapsed and killed 32 people.

== See also ==
- List of airlines of Angola
