= Swiftair Hellas =

Greek airline

IATA	ICAO	Call sign
-	MDF	MED-FREIGHT
- Founded: 11 May 2000; 26 years ago
- AOC #: GR-004
- Hubs: Athens International Airport
- Fleet size: 8
- Parent company: Swiftair
- Headquarters: Markopoulo Mesogaias, Greece
- Website: swiftairhellas.com

Swiftair Hellas is a cargo airline based in Athens, Greece. Its main base is Athens International Airport.

== History ==
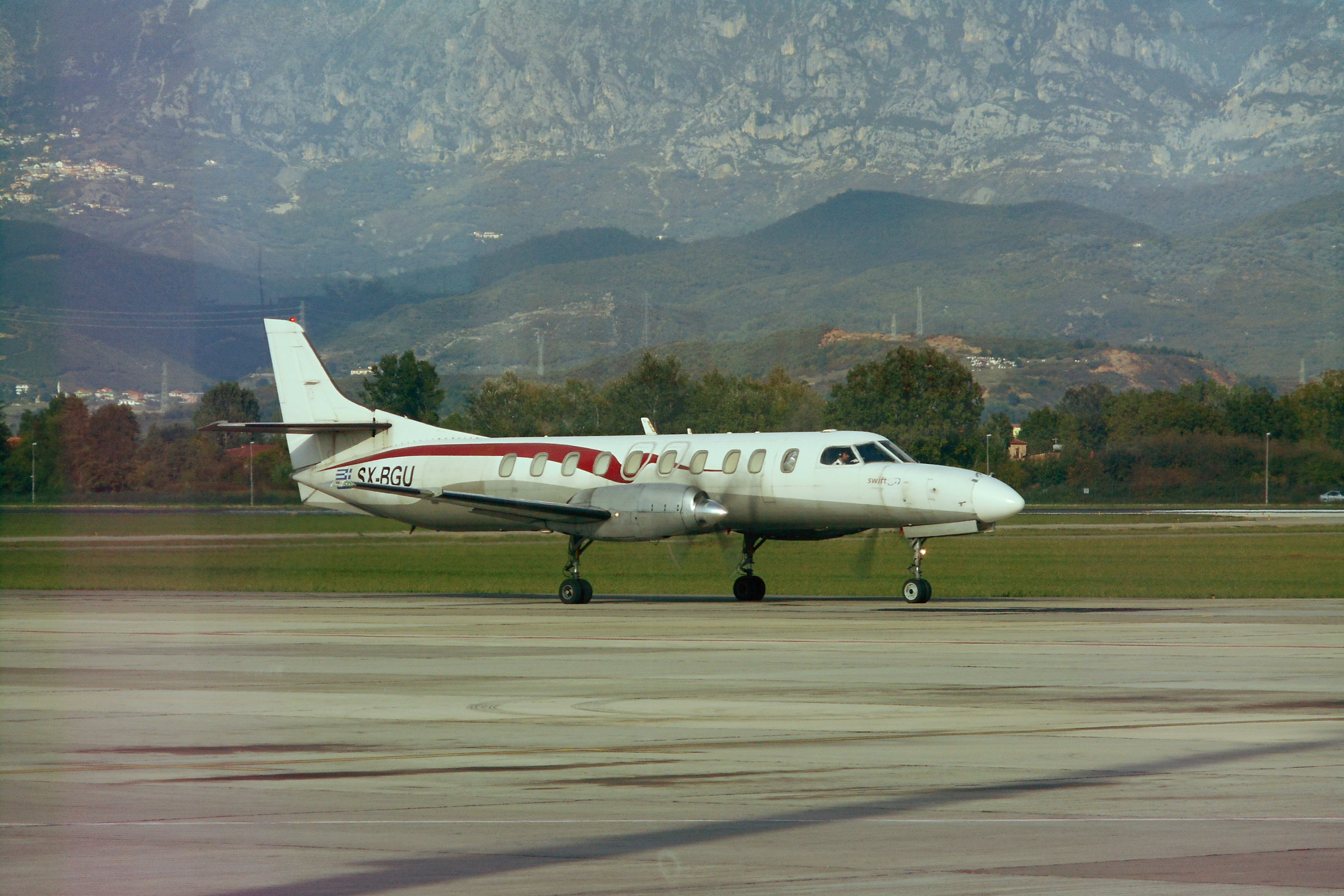
SX-BGU taxiing at Tirana/Rinas Airport, Albania (2015)

Mediterranean Air Freight was established and started operations in May 2000. It is a part of the Swiftair Group of Companies.

== Fleet ==
The Swiftair Hellas fleet includes the following aircraft (at December 2023):

- 3 Fairchild Metro III
- 5 Embraer 120 Brasilia (as of July 2026)
