= Swiftair =

Spanish airline

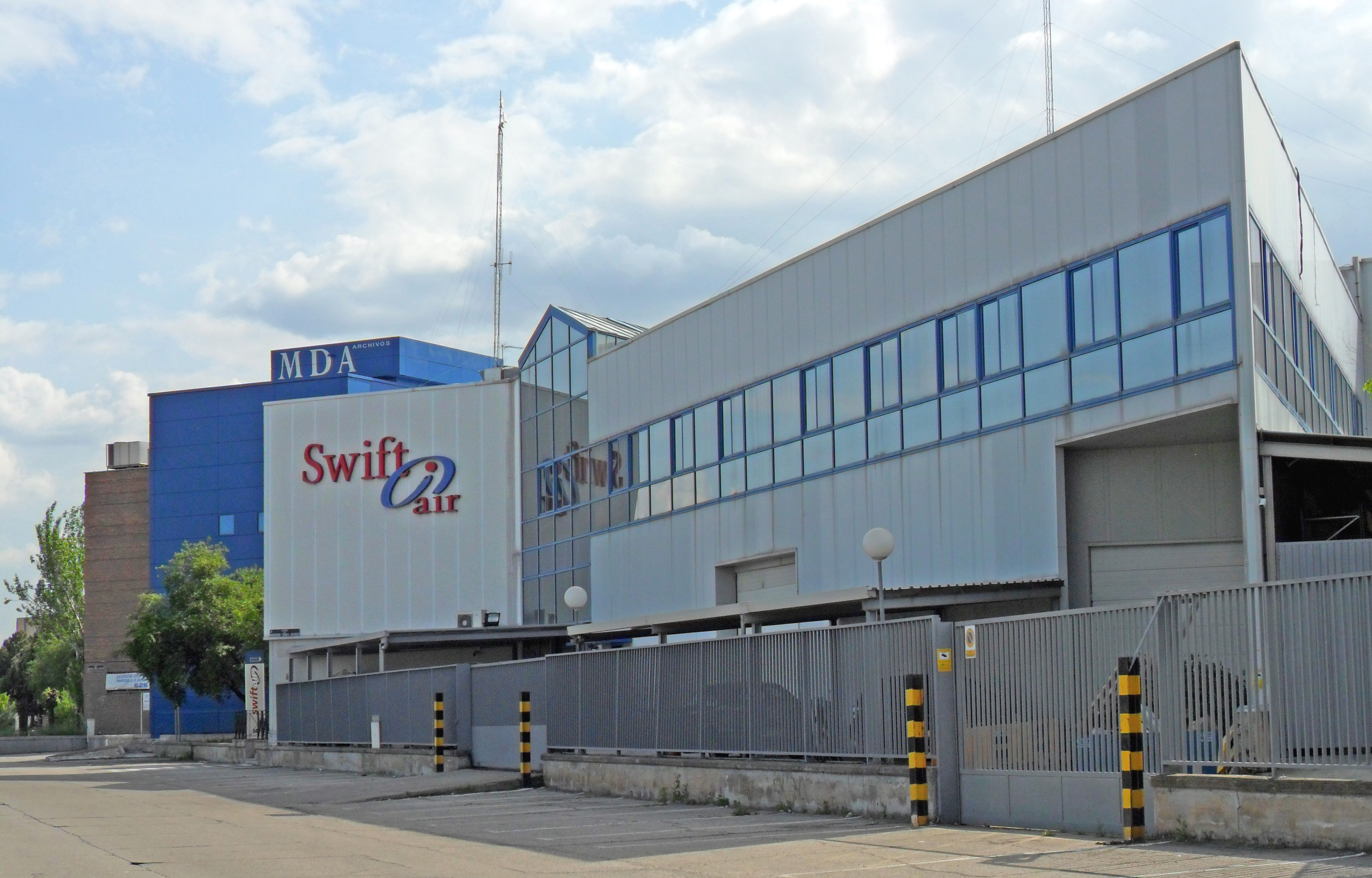
- Swiftair's headquarters in Madrid
IATA	ICAO	Call sign
WT	SWT	SWIFT
- Founded: 1986; 40 years ago
- Hubs: Madrid–Barajas Airport
- Subsidiaries: Swiftair Hellas
- Fleet size: 44
- Parent company: Lusat Air SL
- Headquarters: Madrid, Spain
- Website: www.swiftair.com

Swiftair S.A. is an airline whose headquarters are in Madrid, Spain. It operates scheduled and charter, passenger, and cargo flights in Europe, North Africa and the Middle East. Its main base is Madrid–Barajas Airport.

== History ==
The airline was founded in 1986. It wholly owns subsidiary Mediterranean Air Freight. Currently Swiftair is also a United Nations contractor for the United Nations Mission in Sudan.

== Fleet ==
=== Current fleet ===
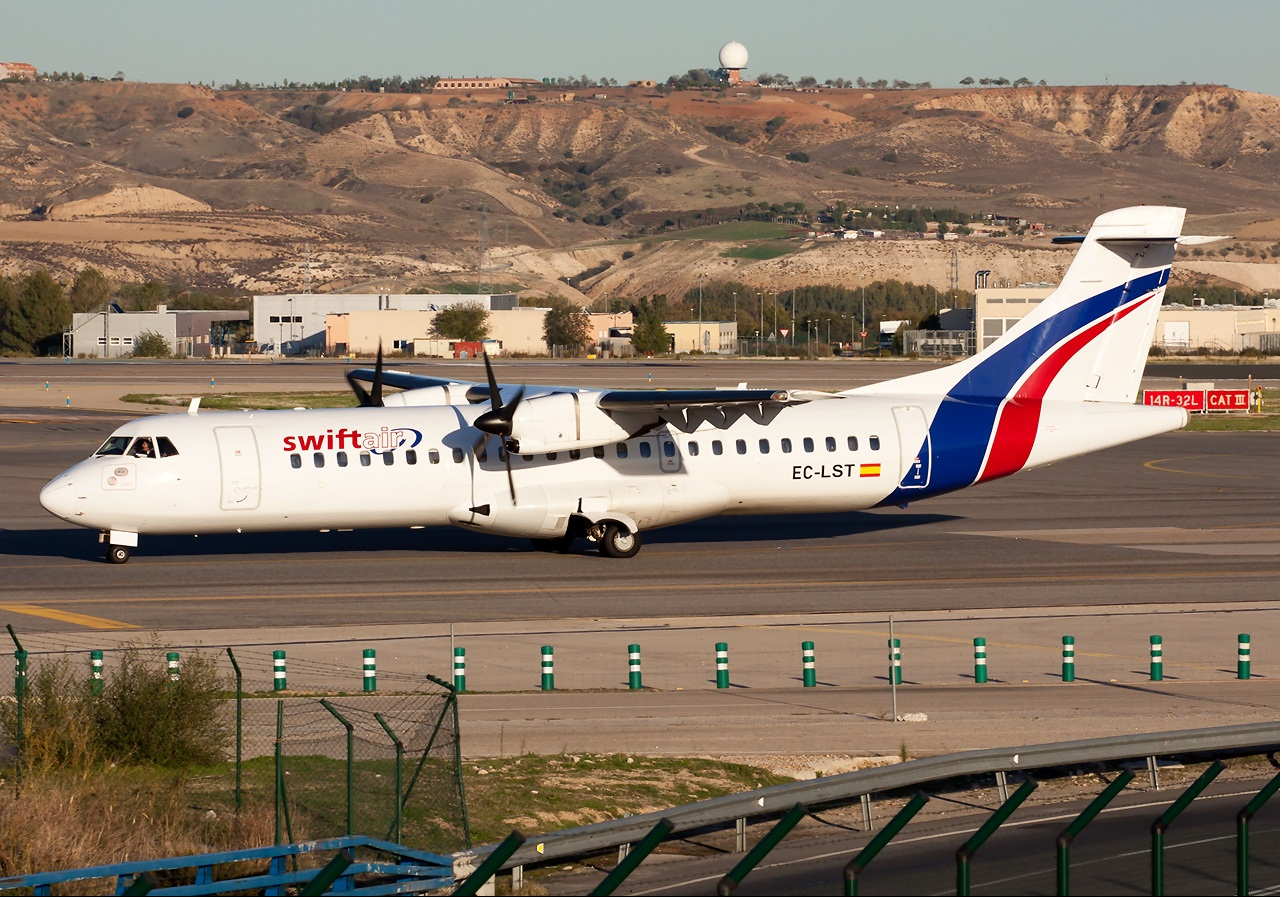
Swiftair ATR 72-200

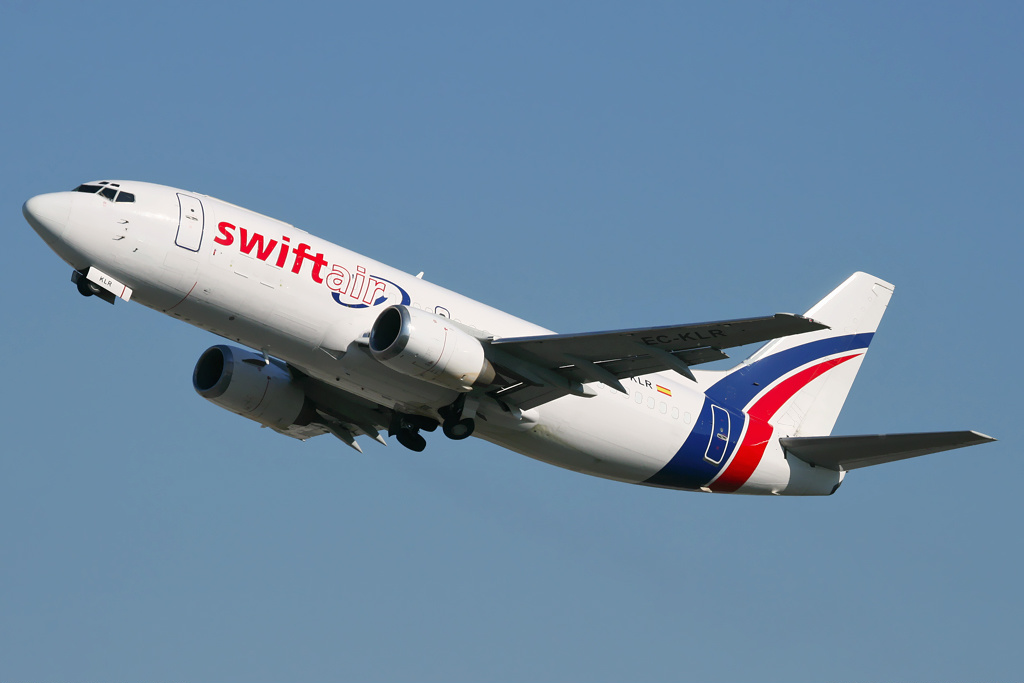
Swiftair Boeing 737-300F

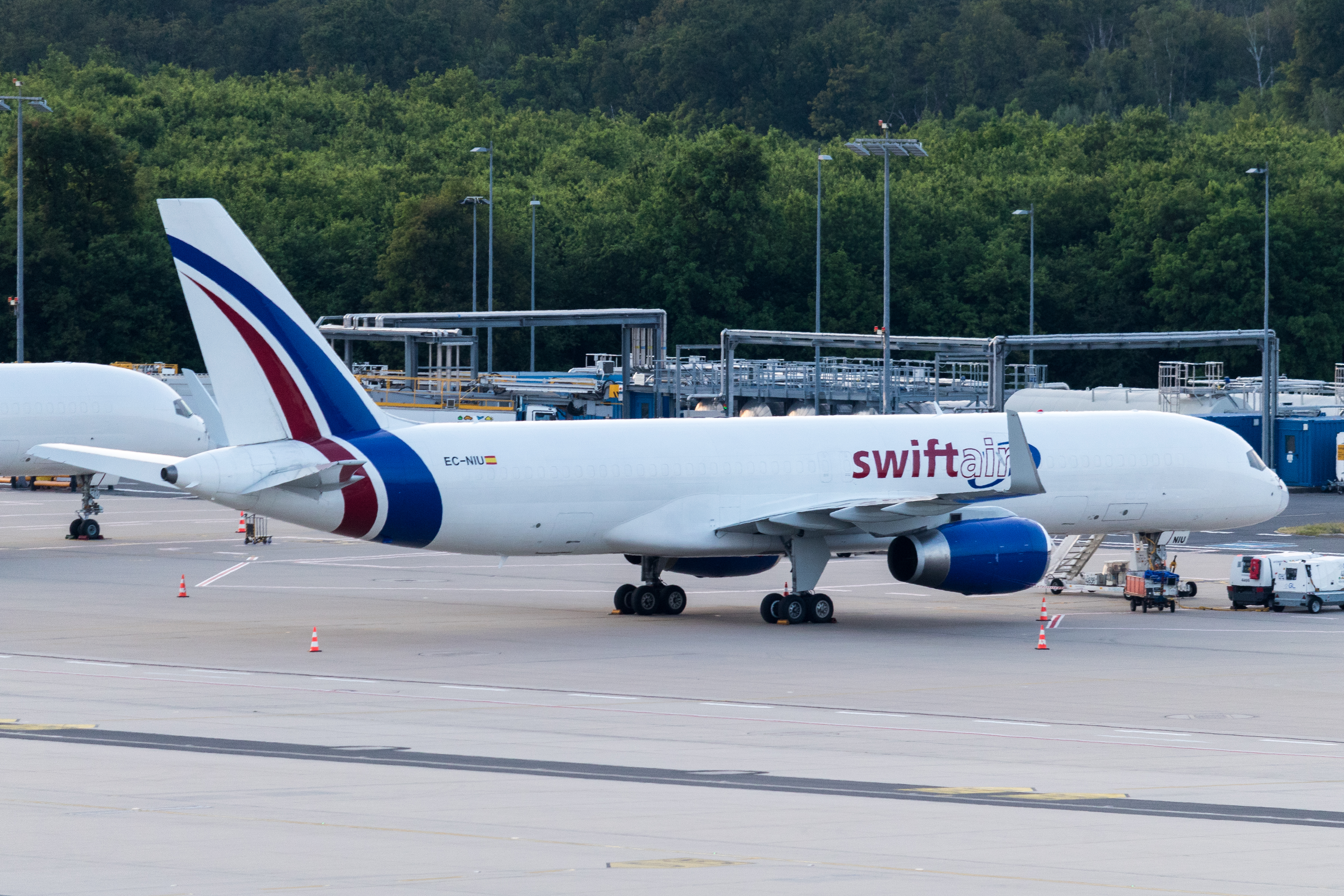
Swiftair Boeing 757-200PCF

As of August 2025, Swiftair operates the following aircraft:

Swiftair fleet
Aircraft	In service	Orders	Notes
Airbus A321-200P2F	4	—	
ATR 42-300F	4	—	
ATR 42-300QC	1	—	
ATR 72-200F	6	—	
ATR 72–500	3	—	
ATR 72-500F	5	—	
ATR 72-600F	4	—	
Boeing 737-400SF	6	—	3 operating for DHL
Boeing 737-800BCF	3	—	
Boeing 737-800BDSF	6	—	Operated for DHL
Boeing 757-200PCF	2	—	
Boeing 757-200PF	1	—	
Total	44		

=== Former fleet ===
Swiftair formerly operated the following aircraft:

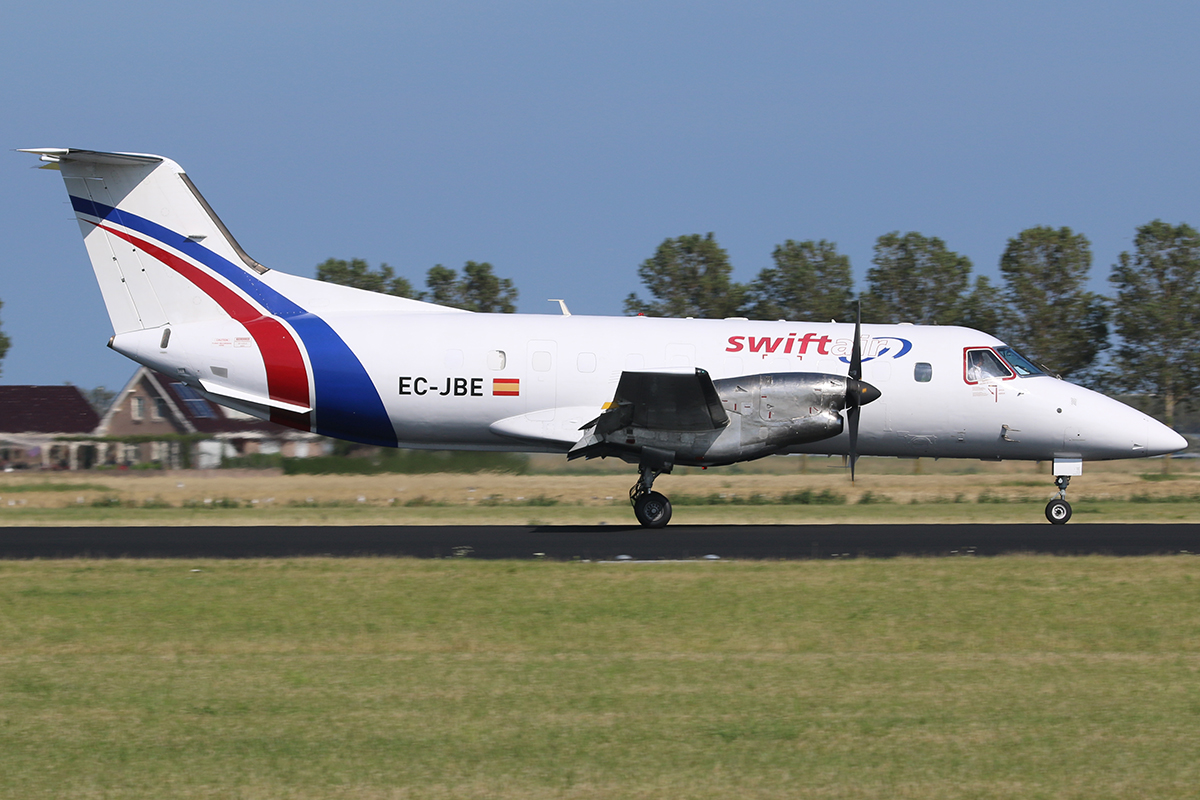
A Swiftair Embraer EMB 120

Swiftair former fleet
Aircraft	Total	Introduced	Retired	Notes
Airbus A300B4F	1	2005	2006	Leased from European Air Transport
Boeing 727-200F	16	1999	2012	
Boeing 737-300BDSF	5	2008	2016	One sold to Buffalo Airways in 2022
Fairchild Swearingen Metroliner	12	1990	2008	Three sold to Swiftair Hellas
Embraer 120	10	–	2023	Five sold to Swiftair Hellas
McDonnell Douglas MD-83	7	2005	2015	One involved in Air Algérie Flight 5017
McDonnell Douglas MD-87	1	2009	2010	Operated by the United Nations

== Accidents and incidents ==
- In October 1994, one of its aircraft was written off when the crew forgot to lower the landing gear as the plane arrived in Madrid.
- In May 1995, another aircraft was damaged beyond repair during a botched landing at Vitoria airport in Spain.
- In 2005, a Boeing 727 operating for DHL sustained starboard wing damage during a botched landing in Kandahar. It was repaired over the next 2 days and returned to Bahrain.
- In January 2012, a plane sustained substantial damage during a botched landing at Kandahar.
- On 24 July 2014, a McDonnell Douglas MD-83 operated by the company performed scheduled flight AH5017 from Ouagadougou to Algiers for Algerian airline Air Algérie. The aircraft disappeared off radar 50 minutes after takeoff and crashed in Gossi, Mali, killing all 116 people on board. On 28 September 2026, the Paris Criminal Court found Swiftair guilty of corporate manslaughter over the crash and imposed a fine of €225,000, the maximum applicable to the company in the proceedings. The court found that negligence in the training of the crew had contributed to the accident. Swiftair disputed its liability and maintained that its safety procedures and pilot training programmes complied with the applicable regulations. At the time of the judgment, the company had ten days to appeal.
- On 18 January 2016, an Embraer 120 freighter took out runway edge lights during its takeoff roll at Amsterdam Schiphol airport, on a flight to London Stansted. No injuries occurred.
- On 17 November 2016, a Boeing 737–400, registration EC-MAD, was flying on behalf of EAT Leipzig out of Shannon Airport when the pilots reported shortly after liftoff that they had lost all instrumentation. The crew remained in visual contact with the airport and returned for a safe landing.
- On 24 September 2022, a Boeing 737-400SF, registration EC-NLS, experienced a runway excursion at Montpellier-Méditerranée Airport, France. After breaking through the barriers, the plane ended its journey in the waters of the Étang de l'Or. There were no injuries among the three crew members.
- On 25 November 2024, Swiftair Flight 5960, a Boeing 737–476(SF) registered as EC-MFE, crashed in Vilnius, Lithuania while on approach, killing one crew member and injuring three others.

== See also ==
- List of airlines of Spain
