= Sundstrand =

Sundstrand is a surname. Notable people with the surname include:

- Anna Sundstrand (born 1989), Swedish singer
- David Sundstrand (1880–1930), American inventor

== See also ==
- Hamilton Sundstrand, American aerospace corporation
- Sundstrand Corporation, American tool manufacturer
