= GE Security =

Business enterprise within General Electric

- Industry: Security
- Defunct: March 1, 2010
- Fate: Acquired by United Technologies
- Headquarters: Bradenton, Florida, United States
- Products: Alert systems; Video surveillance; Explosive detection; Fire safety
- Parent: GE Enterprise Solutions

GE Security was a division of General Electric's GE Enterprise Solutions. It was acquired by UTC on March 1, 2010, and became part of UTC Fire & Security. GE Security's division provides intrusion alarm systems, integrated security systems, fire systems, access control, video surveillance, explosives and illegal drug detection, key control/lockbox, fiber optic transmission, machine guarding, and more. GE Security was based in Bradenton, Florida.

== History ==
GE Security was mainly aimed at businesses, organizations, and governments, but products from GE Security were available for both residents and small businesses. GE Security included different families of detection systems, web-based surveillance systems, and aviation security products, such as handheld and walk-thru explosive/narcotics portals. Much of General Electric's fire systems came from the acquisition of Edwards Systems Technology from SPX Corporation in May 2005.

On November 12, 2009, GE Security announced it had signed a definitive agreement with United Technologies Corporation for UTC to acquire GE's Security business for $1.82 billion. The transaction was approved by the boards of both companies, and the sale closed on March 1, 2010. After UTC's 2020 merger with Raytheon, GE Security's remains are a part of Carrier Global.

GE warned consumers of ongoing scams related to GE Security home security products in which telemarketers and door-to-door salespeople falsely say they work for GE Security and attempt to sell home security systems even though GE has not manufactured, sold, or marketed any home security equipment since 2016.

GE was one of the twelve companies listed in the Dow Jones Index, newly launched in 1896, and the only one of those twelve to remain in the index through 2018. On June 26, 2018, GE retired from the Dow Jones Index after 111 years of membership.
