= Gregory J. Hayes =

American businessman

Gregory Hayes
- Hayes in 2008

Chairman of Raytheon Technologies
- In office April 2020 – 30 April 2025
- Preceded by: Position established
- Succeeded by: Christopher T. Calio

Chairman and CEO of United Technologies
- In office September 2016 – April 2020
- Preceded by: Louis R. Chênevert
- Succeeded by: Position abolished

Personal details
- Born: 1960 or 1961 (age 65–66)
- Education: Cornell University; Purdue University (BA)
- Salary: US$13.4 million (2016)
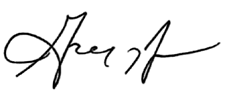
- Signature

Gregory J. Hayes (born 1960/61) is an American businessman. He was the chairman and CEO of United Technologies from September 2016 until April 2020, when United Technologies merged with Raytheon, at which point he became the CEO of the merged company, RTX Corporation. Hayes has announced his retirement from that position, to become effective on May 2, 2024.

== Early life and education ==
Hayes grew up in Williamsville, New York, and was a 1978 graduate of Williamsville South High School. Hayes played football at Cornell University, while studying pre-law for a year, then transferred to the Krannert School of Management at Purdue University, where he earned a bachelor's degree in economics in 1982. He later became a CPA.

== Career ==
After graduating, Hayes joined Sundstrand Corporation, which was acquired by United Technologies (UTC) in 1999. He rose through management, becoming CEO of UTC in November 2014, succeeding Louis R. Chênevert. Hayes was elected chairman in September 2016.

In April 2020, Raytheon Company completed their merger with UTC to form Raytheon Technologies. Hayes was named CEO of the combined company, and Raytheon chairman and CEO Thomas A. Kennedy was named executive chairman.

In September 2022, Foreign Ministry of China spokesperson Mao Ning announced at a press briefing that China has imposed sanctions on Hayes and Boeing Defense, Space & Security CEO Theodore Colbert III, in response to the U.S. arms sale to Taiwan. It is not immediately known what the Chinese sanctions against Hayes and Colbert would entail, and it is often mainly symbolic in nature.

== Boards and affiliations ==
Hayes served on President Trump’s American Manufacturing Council in January 2017, until resigning, in August 2017.

He is a member of Business Roundtable and serves on the board of directors for Nucor.
