= UTC Climate, Controls & Security =

Technology company

- Formerly: UTC Building & Industrial Systems (July 2003- renamed UTC Fire & Security April 2005)
- Industry: Fire detection, Fire suppression, Combustion Control, Physical Security, Electronic Security Heating, Ventilating, Air Conditioning, Refrigeration
- Founded: 2015; 11 years ago (as a subsidiary)
- Defunct: 2020
- Fate: Spun-off as Carrier Global
- Successor: Carrier Global
- Headquarters: Palm Beach Gardens, Florida, USA
- Key people: Robert McDonough, President
- Revenue: ▲US$ 17.812 billion (2017)
- Operating income: ▲US$ 3.300 billion (2017)
- Number of employees: 54,998
- Parent: United Technologies
- Website: UTC CCS Website

UTC Climate, Controls & Security was a global provider of building technologies offering fire safety, security, building automation, heating, ventilating, air-conditioning, and refrigeration systems and services. A wholly owned subsidiary of United Technologies Corporation, UTC Climate, Controls & Security was a $16.7 billion company with 55,000 employees serving customers in more than 180 countries.

In 2020, United Technologies spun off this subsidiary into the independent Carrier Global Corporation. At the same time United Technologies spun off Otis Worldwide Corporation, and then the remaining United Technologies units (Pratt & Whitney and Collins Aerospace) merged with the Raytheon Company to create Raytheon Technologies.

== History ==
Based in Palm Beach Gardens, Florida, UTC Climate, Controls & Security was created by splitting up UTC Building & Industrial Systems into two segments, Otis and UTC Climate, Controls & Security. Otis provides elevator and escalator manufacturing installation, while UTC Climate, Controls & Security's brands provide building technologies, heating and cooling, fire safety and security and refrigeration products and services.

Through its brands, UTC Climate, Controls & Security dates back to 1818, when Jeremiah and Charles Chubb patented the world's first detector lock. In 1881, Robert Edwards patented the first electric alarm bell. In 1902, Willis Carrier developed and later patented the first modern air conditioner. And in 1917, Walter Kidde founded the Walter Kidde Company, which produced the first integrated smoke detection and carbon dioxide extinguishing system for use on board ships.

== Brands ==
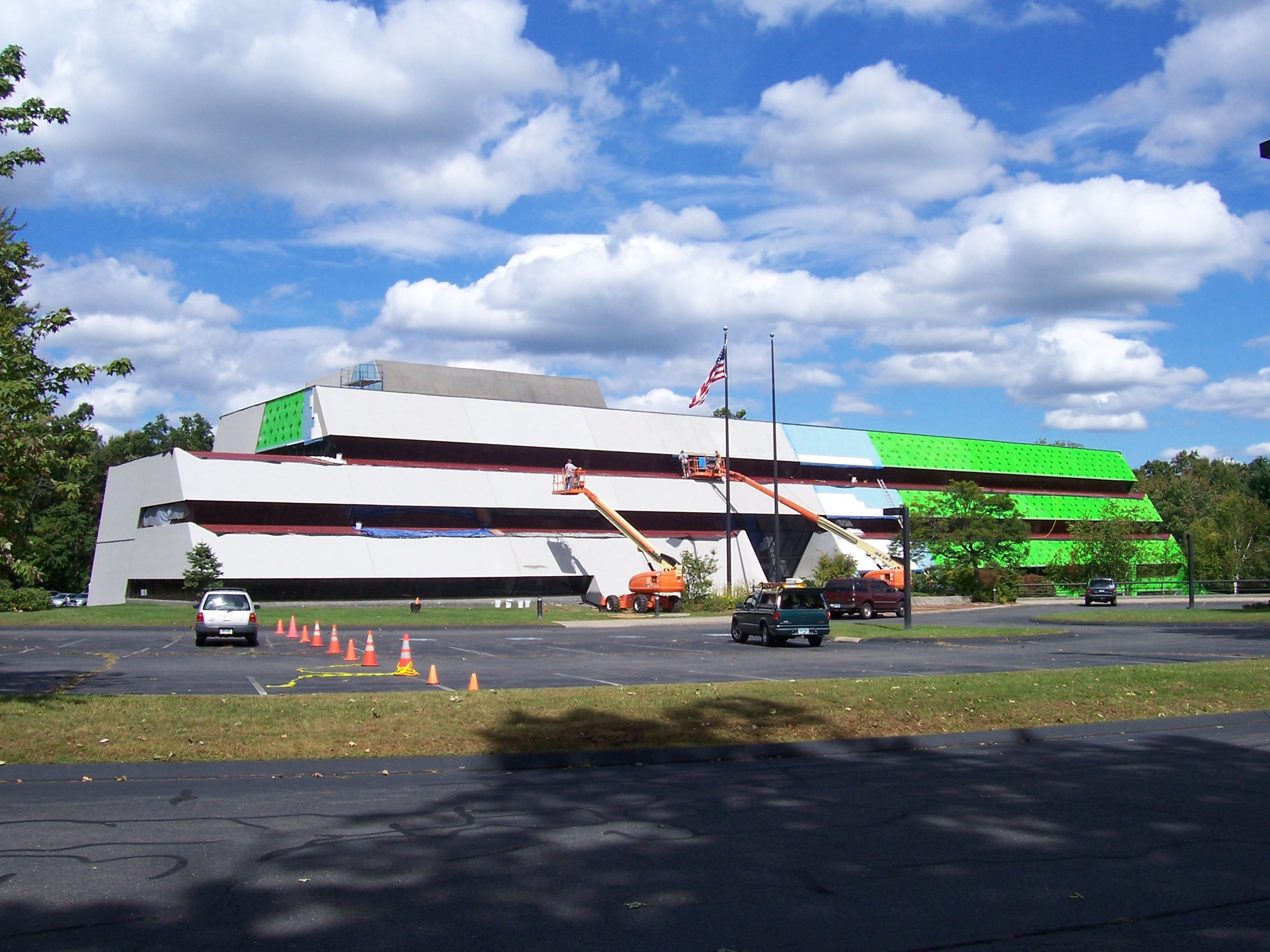
Former Headquarters in Farmington, Connecticut

- Automated Logic, a building-management solutions company
- Autronica, a provider of fire and gas safety systems for offshore, maritime and land applications
- Carrier, a heating, air-conditioning, ventilating and refrigeration solutions company founded by Willis Carrier, the inventor of modern air conditioning
- Carrier Transicold, a container and truck / trailer transport refrigeration company
- Chubb, a company that provides fire safety and security solutions, which range from electronic security systems to staffed guarding operations
- Delta Security Solutions, an electronic security company located in France
- Det-Tronics, a company specialising in industrial fire detection, gas detection, and hazard mitigation systems
- Edwards, a fire detection and alarm business
- Fireye, a provider of flame safeguard controls; combustion controls
- The former GE Security business, a fire and security systems company, acquired in 2010
- GST, a fire detection and alarm business located in China
- Interlogix, security and life-safety solutions for residential and commercial applications
- Kidde, a specialist in fire systems for detection, suppression and fire fighting
- Lenel Systems International, a developer and provider of advanced electronic security systems, acquired in 2005
- Marioff, a water mist fire suppression systems company acquired in 2007
- NORESCO, a U.S.-based energy services company (Northeast Energy Services Company)
- Onity, a provider of electronic locks, in-room safes and energy management solutions which were notably insecure.
- Supra, lock and key management systems
- Sicli, a supplier of fire extinguishers and hose reels in France and Switzerland
- Sensitech, a cold chain solutions provider based in the U.S.
- Taylor, a manufacturer of commercial foodservice equipment to service frozen desserts, beverages and grilled items
- UTEC, manufactures microprocessor-based controls for the HVAC and refrigeration industries

== Products and services ==
- Access Control Systems
- Industrial and Commercial Fire Safety
- Consumer and Residential Fire Safety
- Hazard Sensing and Combustion Control
- Electronic Security
- Commercial Refrigeration
- Transport Refrigeration
- Heating, Ventilating, Air Conditioning
- Monitoring and Response
- Physical Security
- Cash in Transit
- Security Personnel
- Intrusion sensors
- Digital Video
