= Carrier Corporation move to Mexico =

Reversed corporate decision to move manufacturing from the US to Mexico

On February 10, 2016, Carrier Corporation, a division of United Technologies, announced that it was moving its manufacturing operations to Mexico. A cellphone video shot by an employee and posted on YouTube rapidly went viral, making this particular plant closing a national news story, after which Donald Trump made the company's decision to move to Mexico, "a centerpiece of his stump speeches attacking free trade." The move played a role in Trump's presidential campaign that year as a symbol of his protectionist position on international trade, and the same year, played a lesser role in the presidential campaign of Bernie Sanders.

Shortly after becoming president-elect, Trump and vice-president elect Mike Pence announced a deal with Carrier to keep some of the manufacturing jobs in Indiana, while others would still move to Mexico, in exchange for large tax credits granted to the corporation.

== Decision to move production offshore ==
On February 10, 2016, Carrier announced its plans to move its manufacture of air conditioning equipment, now located in Indianapolis, Indiana, to Monterrey, Mexico in 2017. The move of the Indianapolis plant to Mexico was expected to result in the loss of 1,400 jobs in Indianapolis.

A company representative announced the information to an assembly of workers. He said, "The best way to stay competitive and protect the business for long-term is to move production from our facility in Indianapolis to Monterrey, Mexico."

A cellphone video of a Carrier representative announcing the move was recorded by an employee and posted on YouTube; it quickly went viral. Introduced as part of a local news story, the video was posted on Facebook by LaKeisha Austin and picked up by Fox News, The Indianapolis Star and other news outlets on February 12. The slightly "fuzzy" footage, shot by an unidentified Carrier employee shows Carrier President Chris Nelson addressing employees assembled inside a Carrier plant. He tells that, "I want to be clear, this is strictly a business decision," as "agonized, collective cry goes up. People swear, shout and look away."

According to Carol Rogers of the Indiana Business Research Center, the Carrier move drew national attention for reasons other than the video, in particular. the fact that 1,400 is an unusually large number of jobs to be terminate in a single offshoring event. The decision drew hundreds of protestors to Carrier's Indianapolis plant.

=== 2016 Presidential campaign ===
According to The New York Times, three days after the Carrier announcement, Presidential candidate Donald Trump made the company's decision to move to Mexico, "a centerpiece of his stump speeches attacking free trade." Carrier's move to Mexico quickly became a talking point in the 2016 presidential primary campaign as both Bernie Sanders and Donald Trump used the Carrier move to criticize existing trade policies. Democratic candidate Bernie Sanders called the Carrier move, "another example of how NAFTA and other trade policies have been a disaster for American workers."

During the February 13, 2016, Republican Presidential Primary Debate, Trump referenced the video, saying that if elected he would l impose a 35% tax on every air conditioner Carrier imports from Mexico. Trump used the Carrier move as "a key talking point," during the campaign, telling the crowd gathered for a Trump for President rally in Dayton, Ohio that, "I'm going to tell the head of Carrier: 'I hope you enjoy your stay in Mexico folks. But every single unit that you make and send across our border, which now will be real, you're going to pay a 35 percent tax.'"

The Carrier firing video fueled popular anger over the offshoring of jobs that was reflected in the campaigns of both Sanders and Trump. Voters supporting both Sanders and Trump told The New York Times journalists that the loss of jobs caused by free trade policies was their #1 issue.

Financial journalists including David Dayen, and Lance Selfa have used the Carrier move to analyze the argument, made by Sanders and Trump, that the offshoring of manufacturing jobs hurts American workers.

Others focus on Trump's position. Dismissing Trump's argument as "folk economics," Tim Worstall argues that moving production to low-wage countries like Mexico is good for Americans who can buy air conditioners more cheaply. Binyamin Appelbaum, wrote that while the overwhelming majority of economists argue that importing goods manufactured by low-wage manufacturing work has been good for America because the balance of trade remains positive, economists have "oversold their case," neglecting to encounter the reality that, "trade has a downside, and while the benefits of trade are broadly distributed, the costs are often concentrated," borne by former factory workers. By contrast, Jim Cramer thought Trump was correct when he asserts that trade deals lowering tariff barriers have devastated the American economy.

== Reversal of decision to move to Mexico ==
Although it was widely agreed that a reversal of the decision had appeared to be "impossible," when Trump took the issue up during primary campaign season, In mid-November, shortly after being elected to the presidency, Trump called the CEO of United Technologies (owner of Carrier) and asked the CEO to keep operations in the US, stating that Trump's tax and regulatory policies meant Carrier would be "printing money". On November 24 Trump announced that he was "making progress" in persuading Carrier to reverse its decision; the company confirmed that it was discussing with the President elect and Vice President elect Mike Pence. On November 28, the CEO of United Technologies traveled to New York and met with Vice President-elect Pence at Trump Tower, where they reached a deal on state incentives. On November 29 Carrier announced that it would keep half of the 2,000 jobs it had planned to shift to Monterrey, Mexico in Indiana. Mike Pence, Governor of Indiana and Vice President elect was said to have taken the lead in negotiating with Carrier. On December 1, Trump and Pence visited the Carrier plant for a ceremony announcing the deal.

Active negotiations of this kind by Presidents and vice-presidents elect are said to be highly unusual.

=== Details of the deal ===
As details emerged, it appeared that Carrier had agreed to keep one third of the 2,100 jobs it had planned to move to Mexico in Indiana in exchange for about $7 million in government subsidies over the course of 10 years. 800 jobs that Carrier had planned to move to Mexico will stay at the Indianapolis plant, while Carrier will move 600 from the Indianapolis plant to Mexico. However, United Technologies, the parent corporation of Carrier, will go ahead with plans to close a factory in Huntington, Indiana, that manufactures electronic controls, moving 700 jobs from Indiana to Mexico.

The deal also calls for a $16 million investment in the Indianapolis facility. Most of that money will be invested in automation said Greg Hayes, CEO of United Technologies, Carrier's corporate parent. And that automation will replace some of the jobs that were saved. In June 2017, union officials stated that Carrier planned to lay off about 600 employees in July and December 2017. One forklift driver who worked at Carrier for 14 years who did not lose his job in the June closings interviewed by NPR's Morning Edition said he would be bumped down to an assembly line position that was likely to be cut later: "I'm not really optimistic that they're going to be around in another five years," said employee David Simmons. "I mean, I hope I'm wrong, but I just don't see it. I mean, they've been threatening this - to go to Mexico - for at least 10 years."

David A. Graham at The Atlantic saw the Carrier deal as an early indication that Trump may enact some campaign pledges that had been widely viewed as mere campaign posturing.

=== Aftermath ===
As part of the deal, Carrier was permitted to move 600 jobs from Indiana to a plant in Mexico. The facility is located in Monterrey, Mexico. Carrier's labor costs are 80% lower in Mexico than in the USA.

The New York Times reported on August 10, 2018, that Carrier's Indianapolis furnace plant was plagued by low morale and absenteeism because "employees share a looming sense that a factory shutdown is inevitable — that Carrier has merely postponed the closing until a more politically opportune moment."

The Washington Post reported in October 2020 that in early 2017 - four months after the deal was struck - Carrier started building a new facility in China. In May 2017, Carrier notified the state of Indiana that it was eliminating 632 jobs from the Indianapolis plant.

After the deal was struck, Carrier kept approximately 800 jobs in Indiana that were originally planned to go to Mexico, but eliminated over 1,300 jobs in Indiana: 632 at the Indianapolis plant, and 738 from another plant in Indiana. In addition, Carrier eliminated 1,300 jobs outside Indiana as part of company-wide cost-cutting measures.

During 2020, at least 17 Indiana-based companies moved some jobs from Indiana to Mexico, including Black & Decker and Johnson Controls. The total number of jobs moved in 2020 exceeds the number of jobs that were retained in the USA under the Carrier deal.
