= Willis Carrier =

American inventor (1876–1950)

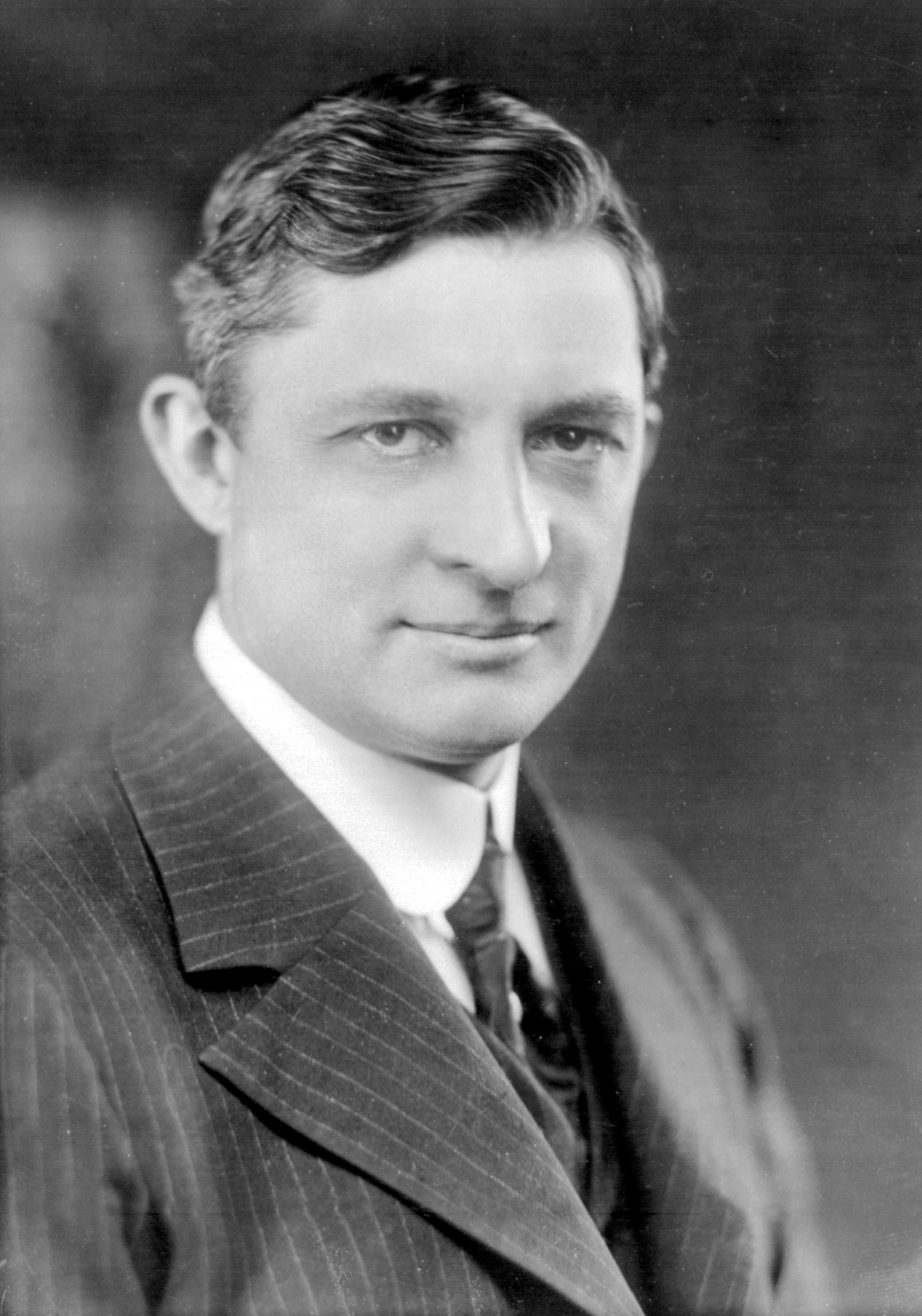
- Carrier in 1915
- Born: Willis Haviland Carrier; November 26, 1876; Angola, New York, U.S.
- Died: October 7, 1950 (aged 73); New York City, U.S.
- Resting place: Forest Lawn Cemetery, Buffalo, New York
- Education: Cornell University (M.E.)
- Occupation: Engineer
- Known for: Inventing modern air conditioning
- Spouses: Edith Claire Seymour (m. 1902; died 1912) Jennie Tifft Martin (m. 1913; died 1939) Elizabeth Marsh Wise (m. 1941–1950)
- Children: 2
- Awards: ASME Medal (1934); Frank P. Brown Medal (1941)

Willis Haviland Carrier (November 26, 1876 – October 7, 1950) was an American engineer, best known for inventing modern air conditioning by inventing the first electrical air conditioning unit in 1902. In 1915, he founded Carrier Corporation, a company specializing in the manufacture and distribution of heating, ventilation, and air conditioning (now abbreviated "HVAC") systems.

== Early life and education ==
Willis Haviland Carrier was born on November 26, 1876, in Angola, New York, the son of Duane Williams Carrier (1836–1908) and Elizabeth R. Haviland (1845–1888). He graduated from Angola Academy in 1894 and from the Buffalo High School in 1897.

He studied at Cornell University, starting in 1897 and graduating in 1901 with a Master of Engineering degree.

== Career ==
After graduating, Carrier joined the Buffalo Forge Company as a research engineer.

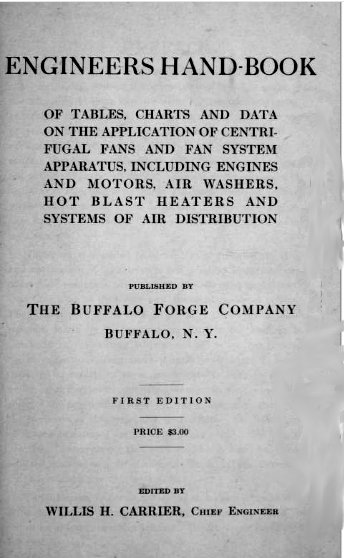
Engineers Hand-book, edited by Carrier while at the Buffalo Forge Co. in 1914

In Buffalo, New York, on July 17, 1902, in response to an air quality problem experienced at the Sackett-Wilhelms Lithographing & Publishing Company of Brooklyn, New York, Willis Carrier submitted drawings for what became recognized as the world's first modern air conditioning system. It was so humid in summer that the paper grew and shrank, which resulted in poor quality images, because the color printing process involved running the same piece of paper up to four times, each with a different color ink.

The 1902 installation marked the birth of air conditioning because of the addition of humidity control, which led to the recognition by authorities in the field that A/C must perform four basic functions:

1. control temperature
2. control humidity
3. control air circulation and ventilation
4. cleanse the air

After several more years of refinement and field testing, on January 2, 1906, Carrier was granted U.S. patent 808,897 for an Apparatus for Treating Air, the world's first spray-type air conditioning equipment. It was designed to humidify or dehumidify air, heating water for the first function and cooling it for the second.

In 1906 Carrier discovered that "constant dew-point depression provided practically constant relative humidity," which later became known among air conditioning engineers as the "law of constant dew-point depression." On this discovery he based the design of an automatic control system, for which he filed a patent claim on May 17, 1907. U.S. patent 1,085,971 was issued on February 3, 1914.

In 1908, the Carrier Air Conditioner Company of America was created as a subsidiary of the Buffalo Forge Company, with Willis Carrier as its vice president.

On December 3, 1911, Carrier presented what is perhaps the most significant document ever prepared on air conditioning – Rational Psychrometric Formulae – at the annual meeting of the American Society of Mechanical Engineers. It became known as the "Magna Carta of Psychrometrics." This document tied together the concepts of relative humidity, absolute humidity, and dew-point temperature, thus making it possible to design air-conditioning systems to precisely fit the requirements at hand.

With the onset of World War I in late 1914, the Buffalo Forge Company, where Carrier had been employed for 12 years, decided to confine its activities entirely to manufacturing. The result was that seven young engineers pooled together their life savings of $32,600 to form the Carrier Engineering Corporation in New York on June 26, 1915. The seven were Carrier, J. Irvine Lyle, Edward T. Murphy, L. Logan Lewis, Ernest T. Lyle, Frank Sanna, Alfred E. Stacey Jr., and Edmund P. Heckel. The company eventually settled on Frelinghuysen Avenue in Newark, New Jersey.

=== Great Depression and afterwards ===
Despite the development of the centrifugal refrigeration machine and the commercial growth of air conditioning to cool buildings in the 1920s, the company ran into financial difficulties, as did many other companies, as a result of the Wall Street Crash in October 1929. In 1930, Carrier Engineering Corp. merged with Brunswick-Kroeschell Company and York Heating & Ventilating Corporation to form the Carrier Corporation, with Willis Carrier named chairman of the board.

The Great Depression slowed residential and commercial use of air conditioning. The company spread out over four cities in New Jersey and Pennsylvania until Carrier consolidated and moved his company to Syracuse, New York, in 1937. The company became one of the largest employers in central New York.

Carrier's igloo-shaped pavilion in the 1939 New York World's Fair gave visitors a glimpse into the future of air conditioning, but before it became popular, World War II began. During the post-war economic boom of the 1950s, air conditioning began its tremendous growth in popularity. Today, air-conditioning and HVAC is a staple in many American homes and businesses.

At the time of his death, Carrier was a trustee of Cornell University.

== Legacy ==
In 1930, Carrier started Toyo Carrier in Japan and Korea. The Carrier Corporation pioneered the design and manufacture of refrigeration machines to cool large spaces. By increasing industrial production in the summer months, air conditioning revolutionized American life. The company became a subsidiary of United Technologies Corporation in 1980, and remained so until 2020, when it was spun off again as an independent publicly traded company. The Carrier Corporation remains a world leader in commercial and residential HVAC and refrigeration. In 2018, the Carrier Corporation had sales of $18.6 billion and employed 53,000 people.

The Willis H. Carrier Total Indoor Environmental Quality Lab at the Syracuse University's Center of Excellence in Environmental and Energy Systems is named in his honor. The lab was established in 2010 with a donation from the Carrier Corp.

== Personal life ==
Carrier met Edith Claire Seymour at Cornell and they married on August 29, 1902. Edith Claire Seymour died in 1912. He married Jennie Tifft Martin on April 16, 1913. She died in 1939. He married Elizabeth Marsh Wise of Terre Haute, Indiana on February 7, 1941. Carrier and all three of his wives are buried in Forest Lawn Cemetery in Buffalo, New York. Carrier fathered one child, Howard Carter Willis. He also adopted another two children from Jennie Martin, Vernon Gardner Carrier (1903–1985) and Earl Gardner Carrier (1905–1983).

Carrier was a Presbyterian. He lived in Syracuse. He died on October 7, 1950, at Cornell Medical Center. He was buried in Forest Lawn Cemetery in Buffalo.

== Awards and recognition ==
For his contributions to science and industry, Willis Carrier was awarded an engineering degree by Lehigh University in 1935 and an honorary Doctor of Letters degree by Alfred University in 1942. He received the ASME Medal in 1934. Carrier was awarded the Frank P. Brown Medal and elected an Honorary Member of the American Society of Mechanical Engineers in 1942. He was inducted posthumously in the National Inventors Hall of Fame (1985) and the Buffalo Science Museum Hall of Fame (2008).
