= Thomas A. Kennedy =

American business executive (born 1955)

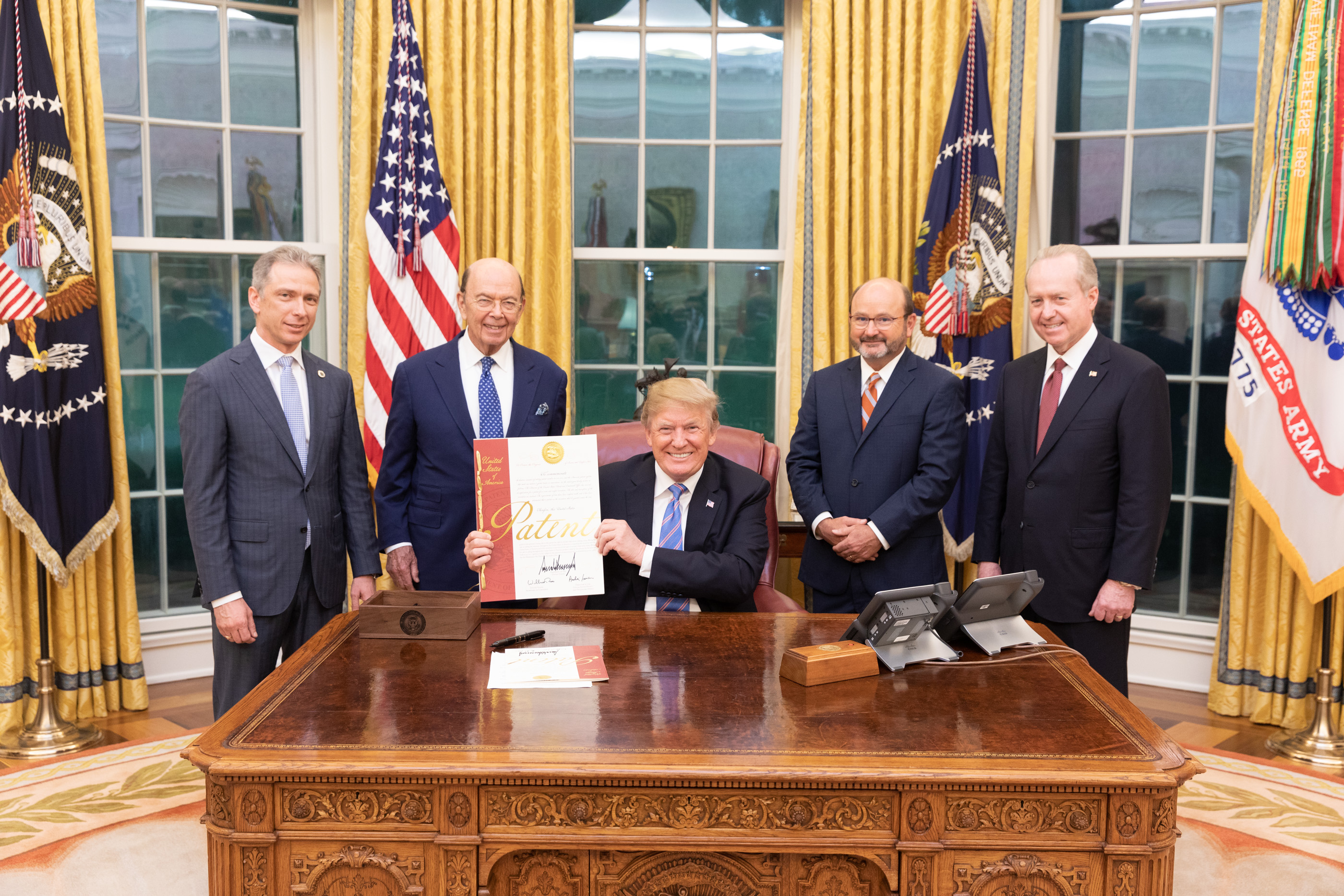
- Kennedy (right) in 2018 at the signing of U.S. patent 10 million
- Born: 1955 (age 70–71)
- Education: Rutgers University, Air Force Institute of Technology, UCLA
- Occupation: Executive Chairman of Raytheon Technologies

Thomas A. Kennedy (born 1955) is an American business executive. He was the chief executive officer (CEO) and chairman of the Raytheon from March 2014 to April 2020.

== Education ==
Kennedy has a BS degree in Electrical Engineering from Rutgers University and a MS degree from Air Force Institute of Technology. Kennedy has a doctorate degree in Engineering from UCLA.

== Career ==
In 1983, Kennedy joined Raytheon Corporation in the area of radar development. Since April 2013, Kennedy has served as executive VP and COO of Raytheon.

In March 2014, at age 58, Kennedy became the CEO of Raytheon, succeeding William H. Swanson. Kennedy was elected to the board of directors in January 2014.

In April 2020, Raytheon Company completed their merger with United Technologies Corporation (UTC) to form Raytheon Technologies. UTC CEO Gregory J. Hayes was named CEO of the combined company, and Kennedy was named Executive Chairman.

Business positions
Preceded by William H. Swanson	CEO of Raytheon; 2014–2020	Succeeded by Gregory J. Hayes
