= CIAT =

CIAT may refer to:

- Chartered Institute of Architectural Technologists
- CIAT Group that provides geothermal energy
- International Center for Tropical Agriculture
- Counter-IED Analysis Team
- Inter-American Center of Tax Administration
