= Yuzuru Ito =

Yuzuru Ito was the founder of Achieving Competitive Excellence (ACE) and Ito University. United Technologies Corporation (UTC) established Ito University as the tangible means to build a network of lean leadership philosophies to improve UTC's internal and external supply systems.

When he was 64, a retiree from Matsushita Electric Industrial Co. (MC), Ito moved to a Hartford suburb to work on improving the productivity of UTC's businesses. George David first encountered Ito in 1989, after he was brought in by the unit's Japanese joint venture partner, Matsushita Industrial, to try to figure out why Otis's newly designed, modern Elevonic 401 elevators were not performing in the field, including some that caught fire. Their callback rates (the number of times per year a building owner has to call mechanics for service) were as high as 40 per unit a year, vs. an average of 0.5 for rival Mitsubishi Electric. Otis dispatched a team of US engineers to get the machines working. Their Japanese partners got directly involved with the engineers who were tasked with analyzing the cause of the problem. Later, with Ito in charge, the work they did changed the fundamental design of the elevator line worldwide. After his death, Ito University was established by United Technologies Company (UTC) to educate and promote quality, Lean & philosophies across all UTC divisions worldwide.

== Ito University Foundations ==
This internal "university" is a three-day course that teaches UTC managers the fundamentals of improving the quality of UTC products, services and business processes. Ito University Foundations is a living tribute to the late Yuzuru Ito, UTC's quality advisor, who led quality efforts for Japan's Matsushita Electric (known in the U.S. as Panasonic) for decades. He was one of the world's foremost experts on quality and UTC's quality advisor from the late 1980s until his death in 2000.
