= Hamilton Sundstrand =

Former American aerospace and industrial products company

- Type: Subsidiary
- Industry: Aerospace and Industrial
- Predecessor: Hamilton Standard; Sundstrand Corporation
- Founded: 1999; 27 years ago
- Defunct: 2012
- Fate: Merged with Goodrich Corporation to form UTC Aerospace Systems
- Headquarters: Windsor Locks, Connecticut, U.S.
- Revenue: $6.2 billion (2011)
- Number of employees: 17,158 (2011)
- Parent: United Technologies Corporation

Hamilton Sundstrand was an American globally active corporation that manufactured and supported aerospace and industrial products for worldwide markets. A subsidiary of United Technologies Corporation, it was headquartered in Windsor Locks, Connecticut. The company was formed from the merger of Hamilton Standard and Sundstrand Corporation in 1999. In 2012, Hamilton Sundstrand was merged with Goodrich Corporation to form UTC Aerospace Systems. In 2018, UTC Aerospace Systems and Rockwell Collins combined to form Collins Aerospace.

== History ==
On June 10, 1999, Hamilton Standard and the Sundstrand Corp. were merged, forming Hamilton Sundstrand. Hamilton Sundstrand traces its roots to the founding of the Sundstrand Corp. in 1905 and Hamilton Standard in 1910. In early 2001, Claverham Ltd was sold to Hamilton Sundstrand.

On 2 January 2008, Hamilton Sundstrand said it would commercialize the concentrated solar power tower technology and corresponding molten salt storage system developed by Rocketdyne through a new entity known as SolarReserve.

In 2012, Hamilton Sundstrand was merged with Goodrich Corporation to form UTC Aerospace Systems. In 2018, UTC merged UTC Aerospace Systems with Rockwell Collins to form Collins Aerospace.

== Products ==
Hamilton Sundstrand was among the largest global suppliers of technologically advanced aerospace and industrial products. Their three major businesses were Aircraft Systems (Commercial and Military), Industrial and Energy, and Space and Defense.

=== Aircraft Systems ===
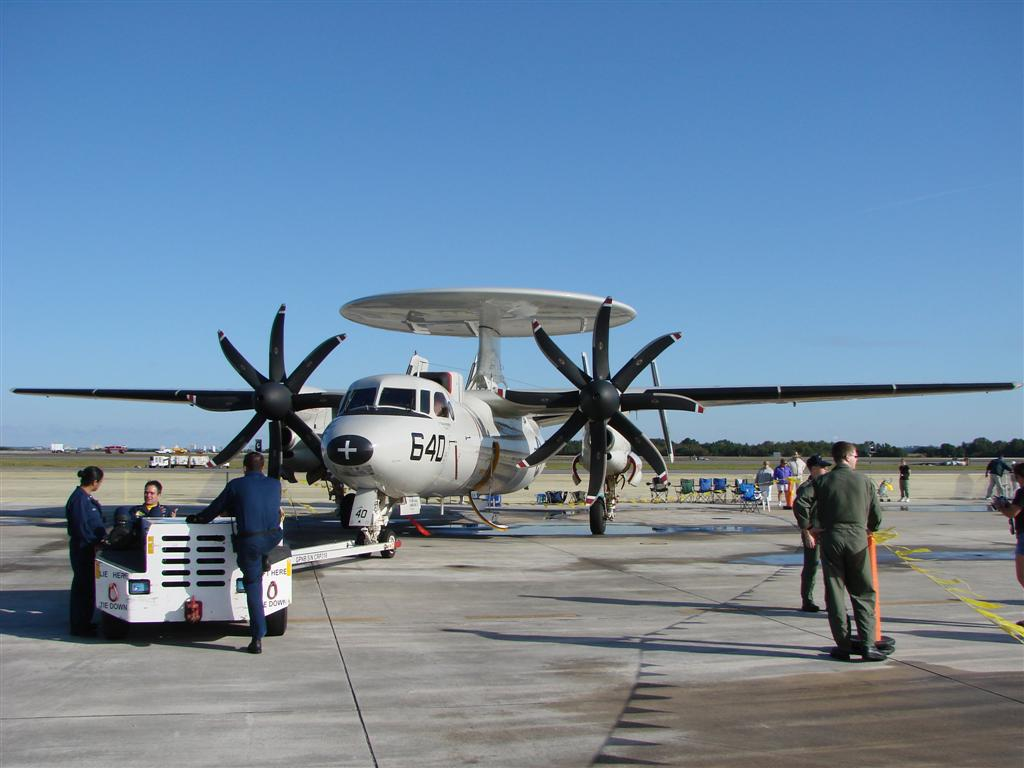
Hamilton Sundstrand NP2000 propellers on a U.S. Navy E-2C Hawkeye

Hamilton Sundstrand supplied integrated systems solutions for military, commercial, regional, and corporate aircraft. These included:

- Electric Systems
- Fire Suppression & Detection
- Air Management and Thermal Systems
- Auxiliary Power Units (APS2000 and APS3200 models)
- Emergency Power Systems
- Engine Systems and Externals
- Propulsion Systems
- Flight Control Systems

=== Industrial ===
The primary industrial products that were offered by HS included metering and specialty pumps, rotary screw air and gas compressors, pneumatic tools, dryers and filters, high-speed centrifugal pumps, integrally geared compressors, and sealless pumps.

Four separate companies that made up the industrial division of Hamilton Sundstrand were:

- Milton Roy Company – Pont-Saint-Pierre, France
- Sullair – Michigan City, Indiana
  - Champion Compressors – Melbourne, Australia
- Sundyne Corporation – Arvada, Colorado
- Precision Engine Controls Corporation – San Diego, California

The industrial division of Hamilton Sundstrand was sold by United Technologies in July 2012 to The Carlyle Group and BC Partners. In 2013, The four industrial companies became subsidiaries of new parent company Accudyne Industries, Inc.

=== Space, Land & Sea ===
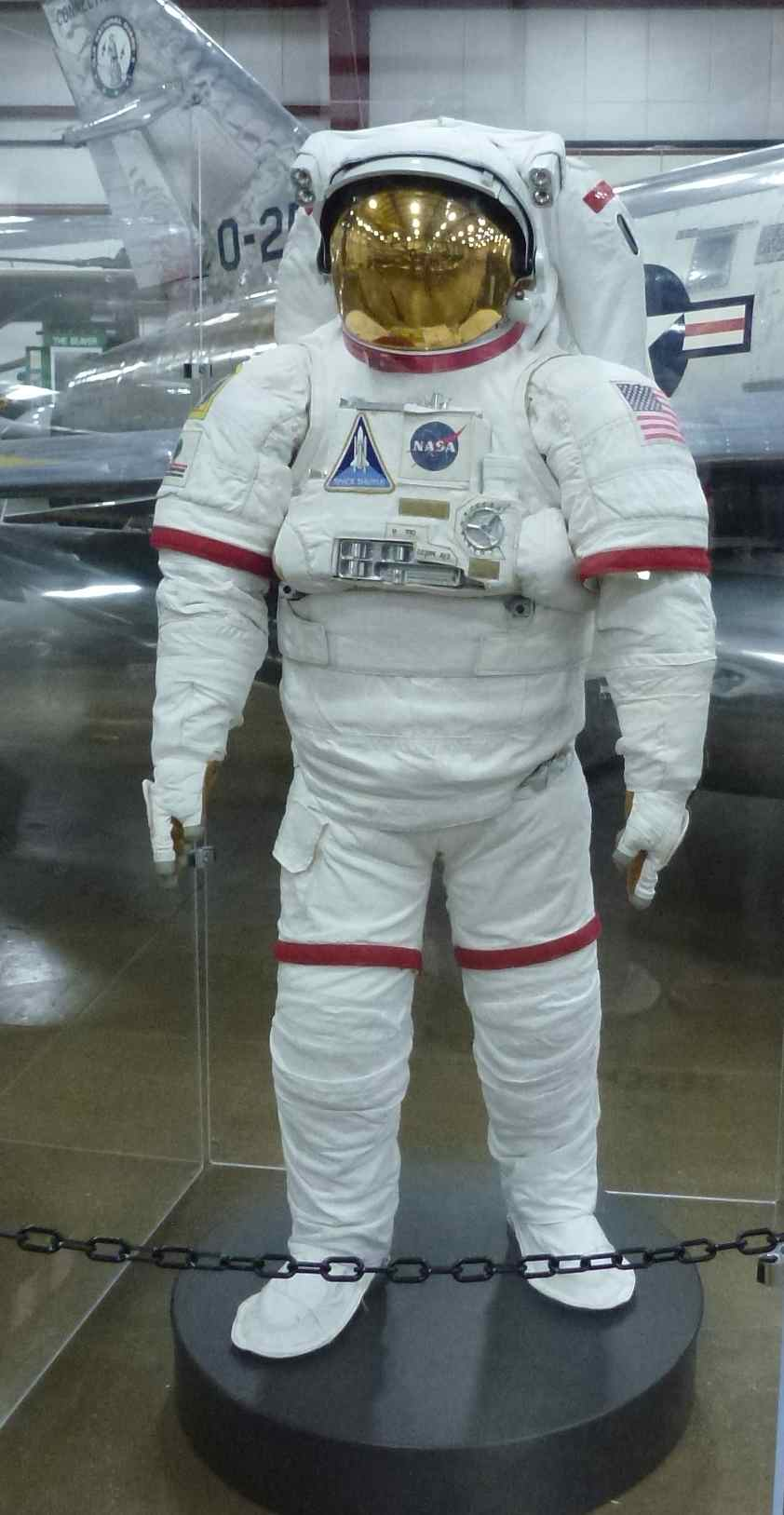
Hamilton Sundstrand space suit, on exhibit at the New England Air Museum

Hamilton Sundstrand was the prime contractor for NASA’s space suit/Primary Life Support System and produced environmental control, life support, mechanical systems, and thermal control systems for international space programs.

== Locations ==
In addition to its headquarters in Windsor Locks, Connecticut, Hamilton Sundstrand had major operations in Rockford, Illinois; San Diego, California; Chatsworth, California; Pomona, California; Phoenix, Arizona; York, Nebraska; and Puerto Rico along with numerous international sites.

Claverham Limited, was an international subsidiary of Hamilton Sundstrand based in Bristol, England.

== US legal action regarding alleged engine software transfer ==
In June 2012, United States charged Hamilton Sundstrand, its parent company United Technologies, and Canadian affiliate Pratt & Whitney Canada, of selling engine control software to China, which aided in the development of the CAIC Z-10. While the Chinese defence ministry denied that China bought or used the software, Pratt & Whitney Canada and Hamilton Sundstrand agreed to pay more than $75 million to the U.S. government to settle the charges.

== See also ==
- List of aircraft propeller manufacturers
