= Theodore Colbert III =

American businessman

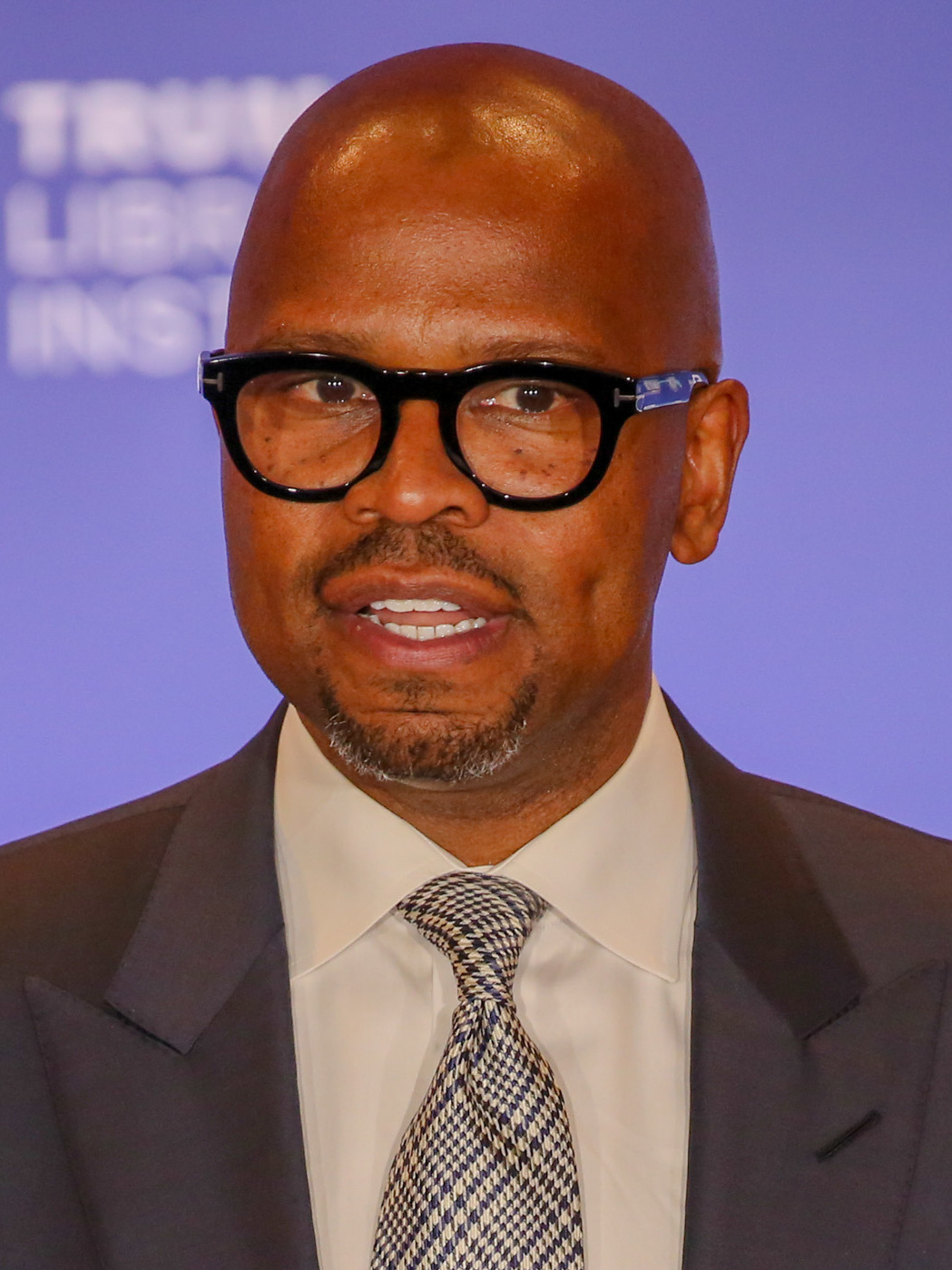
- Colbert in 2023
- Other name: Ted Colbert
- Education: Georgia Institute of Technology; Morehouse College
- Occupation: Businessman
- Title: CEO, Boeing Defense, Space & Security
- Term: March 2022–September 2024
- Predecessor: Leanne Caret

Theodore Colbert III (/ˈkoʊlˈbərt/ kohl-bərt; born 1973) is a businessman, engineer, and the former Chief Executive Officer for Boeing Defense, Space & Security, a subdivision at The Boeing Company. He served in the position from March 2022 until September 2024. Previously, he served as the CEO of Boeing Global Services, and prior to that, he served as the Chief Information Officer at The Boeing Company.

He is a member of the National Aeronautics and Space Administration’s Users’ Advisory Group and won the Black Engineer of the Year Award in 2022 at the 36th Annual BEYA STEM Conference.

== Biography ==
=== Early life and education ===
Colbert was born in 1973 and was raised in Baltimore, Maryland. Colbert’s father worked in labor relations for the Equal Employment Opportunity Commission and the National Labor Relations Board. His mother worked as a social worker. He was a three-sport athlete in high school with aspirations of becoming a lawyer or politician, which were superseded by his interest in technology. During his childhood, he had a Commodore 64, an 8-bit home computer, that furthered his fascination with technology, and which he used for programming. As a result of his high grades in math and science, his high school teachers encouraged him to pursue this passion and study engineering.

Colbert attended Morehouse College, a historically black college, for his undergraduate degree. His decision was partly influenced by his enjoyment of the 1980s sitcom "A Different World," which portrayed life at a fictitious historically black college. Colbert enrolled in a dual degree engineering program offered by Morehouse in conjunction with Georgia Tech. Colbert graduated from this program in 1996 with Bachelor of Science degrees in Industrial and Systems Engineering and Interdisciplinary Science.

=== Career ===
After graduation, Colbert worked at the Ford Motor Company, where he joined the fast-track Ford College Graduate Program in the Information Technology department. After working 11 years at Ford, he began working for Citigroup, serving as the senior vice president of Enterprise Architecture.

In 2009, he joined Boeing and would later lead the Information Technology Infrastructure organization. While working in the I.T. department, he developed network, computing, server, storage, collaboration, and infrastructure solutions for Boeing. He also spent time managing Boeing computer application systems that supported internal systems, Boeing Finance, Human Resources, and Corporate and Commercial Capital Business divisions.

Afterwards, he became the chief information officer of Boeing’s Information Technology & Data Analytics division. During his time as CIO, Colbert launched the Analytic Lab for Aerospace Data at Carnegie Mellon University.

In 2019, Colbert was named president and chief executive officer of Boeing Global Services. In that position, he managed Boeing’s international commercial aerospace development, delivery, and distribution operations.

In March 2022, Boeing announced that Colbert would take over the role of president and chief executive of Boeing Defense, Space and Security from Leanne Caret, who retired after working at Boeing for 28 years.

Colbert stated that his top priorities with Boeing are driving stability and predictability and that the successful advancement of these goals will require a well-trained workforce and resolutions to supply chain issues. Under his leadership, Boeing Defense hired 10,000 employees in 2022 and aims to hire another 15,000 people in 2023. Colbert also led Boeing Defense to collaborate with the US Air Force on the escape system for the T-7. Colbert, was ". . .replaced [on September 20, 2024 as] the head of its troubled defense and space business, which has struggled with money-losing government contracts and embarrassing setbacks involving its Starliner space capsule."

== Sanctions ==
=== China ===
In September 2022, Foreign Ministry of China spokesperson Mao Ning announced at a press briefing that China has imposed sanctions on Colbert and Raytheon Technologies CEO Gregory J. Hayes, in response to the U.S. arms sale to Taiwan. Mao stated that the two would be sanctioned to protect China’s autonomy and security interests, but did not give further details on the sanctions.

=== Russia ===
In November 2022, Colbert was sanctioned by the Russian Federation, along with 199 other Americans, in response to sanctions issued by the Biden Administration over the Russian invasion of Ukraine.

== Memberships ==
=== Board memberships ===
==== Current ====
- Board member, Archer-Daniels-Midland Company
- Vice-chairman of the board, Aerospace Industries Association
- Board member, Thurgood Marshall College Fund
- Board member, Virginia Tech
- Board chair, New Leaders
- Board member, Association of the United States Army
- Board member, District of Columbia College Access Program

=== Other memberships ===
- Member, Alpha Phi Alpha fraternity Gamma Lambda chapter
- Member, National Aeronautics and Space Administration Users’ Advisory Group

== Awards ==
- Fisher Center Prize for Excellence in Driving Transformation, Berkeley Haas School of Business
- Power 100 Honoree (2015), Ebony
- Transformational CIO Award Winner (2016), HMG Strategy
- Golden Torch Legacy Award Winner (2016), National Society of Black Engineers
- Bennie Leadership Award for Excellence in Business (2017), Morehouse College
- CIO Innovation Award (2018), Forbes
- Most Influential Black Executives in Corporate America (2020, 2022), Savoy Magazine
- Most Influential Black Corporate Directors (2021), Savoy Magazine
- Leadership Winner (2021), Capital ORBIE Awards
- Black Engineer of Year Award (2022), 36th Annual BEYA STEM Conference
- National Academy of Engineering (2024)
