= William H. Swanson =

American businessman, engineer and car collector

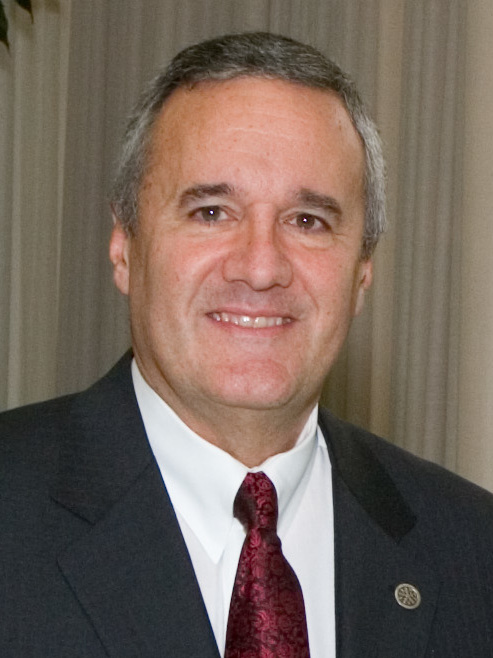
William H. Swanson

William H. Swanson (born 1949) is an American businessman, engineer and car collector who is the former chairman and CEO of Raytheon Company (2004 -2014).

== Education ==
A native of California, Swanson graduated magna cum laude from California Polytechnic State University, San Luis Obispo with a bachelor's degree in aerospace engineering. He attended Cal Poly with the assistance of a golf scholarship. He was awarded an honorary Doctorate from Pepperdine University and served on the Board of Regents of Pepperdine. He was selected as the Outstanding Industrial Engineering Graduate in 1972, and in 1991 was recognized as an Honored Alumnus by California Polytechnic State University College of Engineering. He attended a graduate degree program in business administration at Golden Gate University.

== Career ==
=== Raytheon ===
Swanson joined Raytheon in 1972 as their highest paid starting engineer, and held a wide range of leadership positions, including manufacturing manager of the company’s Equipment Division, general manager of the Missile Systems Division's Andover Plant, senior vice president and general manager of the Missile Systems Division, general manager of Raytheon Electronic Systems, and president, chairman and chief executive officer of Raytheon Systems Company.

Before becoming chairman of Raytheon in January 2004, Swanson was CEO and president of the company. Prior to that he was president of the company, responsible for Raytheon’s government and defense operations, including the four Strategic Business Areas of Missile Defense; Precision Engagement; Intelligence, Surveillance and Reconnaissance (ISR); and Homeland Security. Before that, he was a Raytheon executive vice president and president of Electronic Systems.

As a protégé of chairman and CEO Dennis Picard and a long-time Raytheon insider, he was the expected candidate to succeed the retiring chairman in the late 1990s. However, Daniel Burnham, an outsider, was elected to succeed Dennis Picard as chairman and CEO. After Burnham completed a five-year contract with Raytheon, Swanson was elevated to his position.

Swanson stepped down from the CEO position in March 2014 and retired from Raytheon entirely in September 2014. He was succeeded by Dr. Thomas A. Kennedy, who had previously served as Raytheon's chief operating officer.

== Criticism ==
During William H. Swanson’s tenure as chairman and chief executive officer of Raytheon (2004–2014), the company faced sustained criticism from international human rights organizations regarding the use of its weapons systems in armed conflicts involving civilian casualties. Groups including Amnesty International and Human Rights Watch documented the use of Raytheon-manufactured precision-guided munitions and missile systems in conflicts in Iraq, Afghanistan, Gaza, Yemen, and Lebanon, raising concerns about potential violations of international humanitarian law.

In January 2025, a civil-society initiative known as the Merchants of Death War Crimes Tribunal—a symbolic “people’s tribunal” without formal legal authority—released a report alleging that major U.S. weapons manufacturers, including Raytheon during the period of Swanson’s leadership, had aided and abetted war crimes through the continued sale of weapons later used in unlawful military actions. The tribunal’s findings are not legally binding and have not resulted in criminal charges against Swanson, but have been cited by advocacy groups calling for stricter arms-export controls and corporate accountability.

Investigative reporting by The Intercept and other media outlets has examined Raytheon’s weapons exports, lobbying practices, and alleged compliance failures during and after Swanson’s tenure as chief executive.

== Car Collection ==
Swanson is the owner and curator of an entirely-red collection of exotic vehicles based in Arroyo Grande, California. The collection, which primarily houses Ferraris, includes cars from the 1960s to the modern day. The license plate on every car contains his initials “WHS" alongside a different number or letter(s). The collection currently includes:

- Ferrari 250 GT Pininfarina Cabriolet Series I
- Ferrari 250 GT LWB Berlinetta
- Ferrari 275 GTB/4
- Ferrari F40
- Ferrari F50
- Ferrari Enzo
- Ferrari LaFerrari
- Ferrari F12 TDF
- Ferrari SA Aperta
- Ferrari 812 Superfast
- Porsche Carrera GT
- Porsche 918 Spyder
- Bugatti Veyron 16.4
- Cobra 289
- Cobra 427
- BMW 507
- Ford GT40 Mk I (1965)
- Ford GT (2005)
- Ford GT (2017)

== Post-retirement ==
Swanson founded the Center of Effort Winery based in Edna Valley, California in 2008.

== Honors and associations ==
- Member of the board of directors of Sprint Nextel Corporation.
- Member of the Congressional Medal of Honor Foundation board of directors, the California Polytechnic State University President’s Cabinet, and the Rose Kennedy Greenway board.
- Appointed to the Pepperdine University board of regents and awarded an honorary doctor of laws degree and the Woodrow Wilson Award for Corporate Citizenship.
- Member of the Secretary of the Air Force advisory board.
- Trustee of the Association of the United States Army.
- Member of the National Defense Industrial Association.
- Member of the Navy League.
- Member of the Air Force Association.
- Member of the Board of Governors of the Aerospace Industries Association.
- Member of the CIA Officers Memorial Foundation board of advisors.
- Associate fellow of the American Institute of Aeronautics and Astronautics.
- Member of the US president’s National Security Telecommunications Advisory Committee.
- Vice chairman of the Business-Higher Education Forum (BHEF).
- Co-chair of BHEF's Securing America's Leadership in Science, Technology, Engineering and Mathematics (STEM) Initiative.
- Honorary chair of MATHCOUNTS for 2009 through 2011.
- Honorary chair of 2011 Engineers Week.
- Navy Distinguished Civilian Service Award 2019
- Navy League Fleet Admiral Chester W. Nimitz Award

== Swanson's Unwritten Rules of Management and plagiarism ==
Swanson released a short work called Swanson's Unwritten Rules of Management, thirty three sound-bite rules, including the comparatively well known "Waiter Rule".

On April 24, 2006, in a statement released by Raytheon, Swanson admitted to plagiarism in claiming authorship for his booklet, "Swanson's Unwritten Rules of Management," after being exposed by an article in The New York Times. On May 2, 2006, Raytheon withdrew distribution of the book. On May 3, 2006, Raytheon punished Swanson by reducing his compensation by approximately $1 million for publishing what was "later found to have been taken from a 1944 engineering classic, The Unwritten Laws of Engineering, by W. J. King." Further investigation by the Boston Herald revealed that Swanson had also copied some of the rules from former US Secretary of Defense Donald Rumsfeld and columnist Dave Barry.

The Boston Globe, the major newspaper in Raytheon's home town, reported "the move was largely symbolic given Swanson's robust $7 million pay package in 2005."

Business positions
Preceded by Daniel P. Burnham	CEO of Raytheon; 2003– 2014	Succeeded by Thomas A. Kennedy
