= David Sundstrand =

David Sundstrand (1880-1930) was a Swedish-born American inventor of the 10-key adding machine, 10-key calculator keyboard, a 10-keypad now used on computer keyboards, and a co-founder of Sundstrand Corporation.

Sundstrand's 1914 adding machine had the first now common place keyboard for 10-key calculators and numeric keypads. This 1914 invention was filed as patent No. 1198487. This invention was seminal to the development of an extensive range of machines that continued for decades into the 1950s.
