= Waiter Rule =

Principle for understanding others' character

The Waiter Rule is a principle holding that one's true character can be gleaned from how one treats staff or pink-collar workers, such as waiters. It was one of American businessman William H. Swanson's Unwritten Rules of Management, which was plagiarized from American author Dave Barry's version: "If someone is nice to you but rude to the waiter, they are not a nice person."
