= International Comfort Products =

American air conditioning manufacturing company

International Comfort Products Corporation
- Company type: Subsidiary
- Industry: Heating, Ventilating and Air Conditioning (HVAC) Systems
- Founded: 1900; 126 years ago
- Headquarters: Lewisburg, Tennessee
- Key people: J.T. Holtschlag (GM)
- Revenue: ▲$48.9 million USD (2007)
- Number of employees: 550
- Parent: Carrier Global
- Website: www.icpusa.com

International Comfort Products Corporation (ICP) is an American company that designs, manufactures and markets oil and gas furnaces, heat pumps, and central air conditioning (HVAC) for residential and commercial customers. It is a subsidiary of Carrier Global and is headquartered in Lewisburg, Tennessee, United States.
