= Louis R. Chênevert =

Canadian businessman

- Born: 1958 (age 67–68); Montreal, Quebec, Canada
- Education: Université de Montréal
- Occupation: Chief executive officer of UTC (Retired)
- Predecessor: George David
- Successor: Gregory J. Hayes
- Spouse: Debra Chênevert
- Awards: 2010 FDNY Fire Commissioner's Humanitarian Award; 2010 Pace Award for Leadership in Business Ethics; 2009 Honor Award

Louis R. Chênevert (born 1958) is a Canadian businessman. He served as the Chairman and Chief Executive Officer of United Technologies Corporation and was also President of Pratt & Whitney.

== Early life and education ==
Chênevert was born in Montreal, Quebec. He earned a bachelor of business administration degree in production management from HEC Montréal, an affiliated Business School of University of Montreal, in 1979. In May 2011, Chênevert received a doctorate honoris causa from HEC Montréal. He was awarded a doctorate honoris causa from Concordia University in 2014.

== Career ==
Chênevert worked for General Motors for 14 years where he became general production manager before joining Pratt & Whitney Canada in 1993. He was named vice-president of operations and later president of Pratt & Whitney in 1999. In March 2006, he joined United Technologies Corporation and became chief operating officer, president, and director. In 2008, he was named CEO. Chênevert became chairman of the board in January 2010.

In June 2011, Chênevert joined the board of Cargill Inc. Chênevert previously served as vice-chairman of the executive committee of The Business Council in 2011 and 2012. In 2013, he received the United Service Organization's (USO) Distinguished Service Award.

On December 8, 2014 Chênevert "abruptly resigned" as CEO of United Technologies Corp. and was replaced by director Edward Kangas, until Gregory Hayes acquired the post in November 2014.

Chênevert was voted co-chairman on the Congressional Medal of Honor Foundation Board of Directors in March 2015 after serving on the board since 2008. In September 2015, he took up the role of an Exclusive Advisor in the Merchant Banking Division at Goldman Sachs for an undisclosed compensation; where he will be targeting opportunities in the aerospace and industrial sectors and advise other businesses.

Chênevert is a founding member and director of the United States Friends of HEC Montréal Foundation and chairs the HEC Montréal International Advisory Board. He is also chairman of the Yale Cancer Center Advisory Board.

== Personal life ==
In 2005, Chênevert was inducted as a Fellow of the American Institute of Aeronautics and Astronautics (AIAA).

He is the 2009 recipient of the Honor Award from the National Building Museum.

U.S. aviation trade magazine Aviation Week & Space Technology named Chênevert its Person of the Year 2011.

Business positions
Preceded by George David	CEO of United Technologies Corporation; April 9, 2008 – November 24, 2014	Succeeded by Gregory J. Hayes
