= Buffalo Forge Company =

American manufacturing company

- Industry: Blacksmithing
- Founded: 1878 (incorporated: 1900)
- Defunct: 1993
- Fate: Acquired
- Successor: Howden Group
- Headquarters: Buffalo, New York, United States
- Products: Forges, Drills, Fans, Machinery
- Owner: William F. Wendt
- Website: buffaloforgeco.com

The Buffalo Forge Company was formed in 1878 to manufacture blacksmith’s forges. Their product offerings were expanded to include drilling machines in 1883, and steam engines and pumps in 1889.

== History ==
Brothers William F. Wendt and Henry Wendt founded Buffalo Forge Company in 1878 and started selling a portable blacksmith forge. Henry sold his interest in the company back to William in 1916.

In 1903, the company absorbed all the plants of the George L. Squier Manufacturing Company. It did the same with the Buffalo Seam Pump Company in 1904.

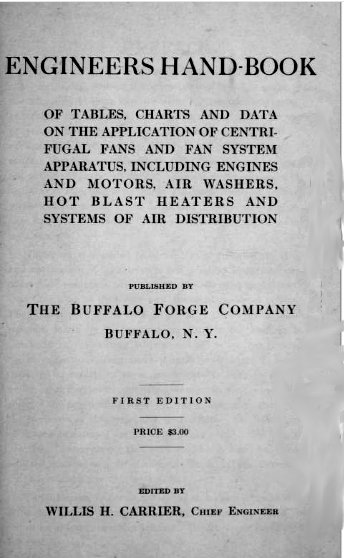
Engineering book published by the company in 1914, edited by Willis Carrier.

In 1902, Willis Carrier, an engineer at Buffalo Forge, submitted drawings for what became recognized as the world's first modern air conditioning system. In 1915, he left the company to form Carrier Engineering Corporation.

The Buffalo Forge Company was listed on the New York Stock Exchange in 1941.

The Wendt family retired from ownership of the company in 1981 after it was acquired in a hostile takeover by Ampco-Pittsburgh. The company was then sold to the Scotland-based Howden Group P.L.C. in 1993.

In 1997, Buffalo Machine Tools was created from the machine tool division of Buffalo Forge. The Howden subsidiary containing the remainder of Buffalo Forge was remanded Howden Buffalo in 1999.

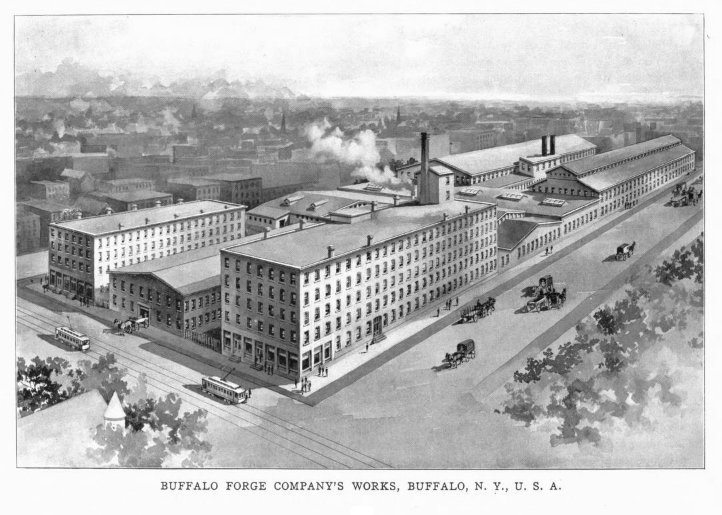
The Buffalo Forge Co. works, about 1899

=== Other products ===
Heating equipment, dust collectors, and a range of metal cutting and forming equipment were also manufactured by the company. Buffalo Forge operated several other plants in the United States, Canada, and Mexico.

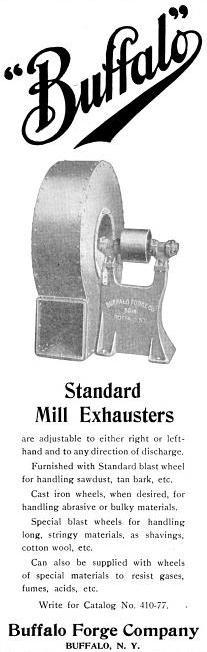
Buffalo Forge Company (Advertisement) for a mill exhauster (March, 1919)

=== Mergers, acquisitions & significant events ===
| 1900 | Buffalo Forge was incorporated with a capitalization of $500,000. |
| 1902 | Geo. L. Squier Manufacturing Company of Buffalo was purchased, opening the company up to a South and Central America market. |
| 1941 | It was decided that the company would be best served if the stock was offered on the New York Stock Exchange. A reorganization was made at that time so that The Squier Corporation, Buffalo Pumps, Inc., and the Canadian Companies became wholly owned subsidiaries of Buffalo Forge Company. |
| 1993 | Buffalo Forge was acquired by the Howden Group. |
| 1997 | Buffalo Machine Tools of Lockport, New York was created from the machine tool division of Buffalo Forge. |
| 1999 | The Howden subsidiary containing the remainder of Buffalo Forge was renamed Howden Buffalo. |
| 2006 | The company's 14-acre original manufacturing plant located at 490 Broadway St. in Buffalo was razed. This included the six story "Building 3" at 470-474 Broadway St. which was the final building to be destroyed. |
| 2010 | The Howden subsidiary containing the remainder of Buffalo Forge was renamed Howden North America Inc.. |
| 2010 | The Buffalo Machine Tools subsidiary containing the machine tool division of Buffalo Forge was renamed to Buffalo Machines, Inc of Lockport, New York |
