= UTC Aerospace Systems =

Defunct American aerospace and defence company

- Type: Subsidiary
- Industry: Aerospace and industrial
- Predecessor: Goodrich Corporation; Hamilton Sundstrand
- Founded: 2012; 14 years ago
- Defunct: 2018
- Fate: Merged with Rockwell Collins to form Collins Aerospace
- Headquarters: Charlotte, North Carolina, U.S.
- Revenue: ▲US$ 14.691 billion (2017)
- Operating income: ▲US$ 2.370 billion (2017)
- Number of employees: 40,984 (2017)
- Parent: United Technologies Corporation
- Website: utcaerospacesystems.com

UTC Aerospace Systems (UTAS) was one of the world’s largest suppliers of aerospace and defense products, headquartered in Charlotte, North Carolina, United States. The company was formed in August 2012 when parent United Technologies Corporation merged their existing subsidiary Hamilton Sundstrand with the newly-acquired Goodrich Corporation. In 2018, UTC acquired Rockwell Collins which was merged to form Collins Aerospace.

== Background ==
UTC Aerospace Systems was the owner of Ithaco Space Systems, Inc., formerly owned by Goodrich Company. Ithaco has produced items for the field of satellite control since 1962, such as Earth sensors, reaction/momentum wheels, magnetometers and magnetic torquers. In addition to over 100 U.S. satellites, equipment made by Ithaco flew on Japanese, Canadian, French, German, Spanish, Swedish, and Argentinean spacecraft. Ithaco became notable for having manufactured the reaction wheels of the Kepler spacecraft, the Hayabusa spacecraft, the Mesosphere Energetics and Dynamics (TIMED) satellite and the Dawn spacecraft, which developed problems or even failed. The ROSAT reaction wheels lasted over eight years.

UTC Aerospace Systems announced layoffs at Ithaco Space Systems in August 2012 due to Ithaco having been "focused on space programs that have recently seen slower growth", and further layoffs at former Hamilton Sundstrand.

In 2018, UTC acquired Rockwell Collins for $30 billion and restructured as Collins Aerospace.

== Products ==
UTC Aerospace Systems was engaged in designing, manufacturing and servicing systems and components for commercial, regional, business and military aircraft, helicopters and other platforms. UTC Aerospace Systems was also a major supplier to international space programs, including NASA's Orion spacecraft.

== See also ==
- List of aircraft propeller manufacturers
- LucasVarity
- Pratt & Whitney
