= Sundstrand Corporation =

American manufacturing company

- Company type: Subsidiary
- Industry: Aerospace and Industrial Products
- Founded: June 1926 as Sundstrand Machine Tool Company
- Fate: Merged
- Successor: Hamilton Sundstrand
- Headquarters: Rockford, Illinois
- Key people: Hugo L. Olson, Edwin Cedarleaf, David Sundstrand, Harry Stonecipher, Oscar Sundstrand

Sundstrand Corporation was founded in 1926 as a merger of two companies started by Swedish immigrants: the Rockford Tool Company and the Rockford Milling Machine Company in Rockford, Illinois. It was known as Sundstrand Machine Tool Company until 1959 when shareholders voted to change the name to Sundstrand Corporation.

Sundstrand was a manufacturer of aerospace and industrial products. Aerospace products included emergency power and secondary power systems, while industrial products included electric power generating systems, constant speed drives, and gas turbine engines.

It also owned and operated a technology business that provided in-flight entertainment programming as well as video and audio playback equipment for the airline industry. Sony purchased the business from Sundstrand in 1989, renaming it Sony Trans Com, and subsequently sold it to Rockwell Collins in 2000.

In 1999, when United Technologies Corporation acquired Sundstrand, it merged with Hamilton Standard creating Hamilton Sundstrand.
