= Leanne Caret =

American businesswoman (born 1966)

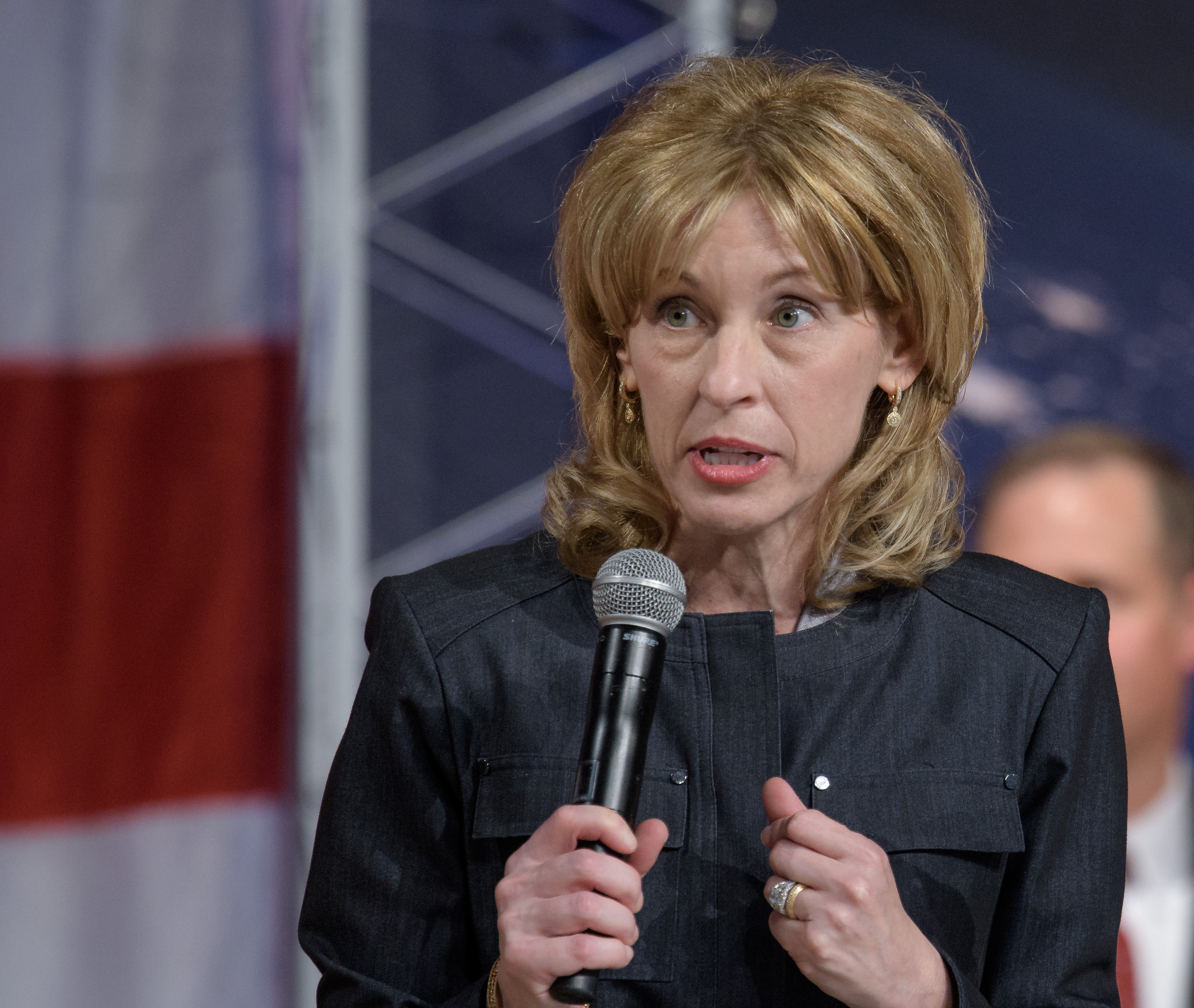
- Caret in 2018
- Born: 18 November 1966 (age 59)
- Education: Kansas State University (BS); Wichita State University (MBA)
- Title: Former executive vice president, Boeing
- Term: 1988–2022
- Spouse: Steve Caret

Leanne Caret (born 18 November 1966) is an American businesswoman, former president and CEO of Boeing Defense, Space & Security (BDS), former executive vice president of Boeing, and serves on the United Service Organizations (USO) board of governors.

== Education ==
Caret received her bachelor's degree in business administration from Kansas State University and a Master of Business Administration (MBA) from Wichita State University.

== Career ==
In 1988, Caret began her career with Boeing and has held various program management positions in the defense business. Later, she became vice president and general manager of Vertical Lift within BDS. She served as chief financial officer and vice president of BDS, and then the presidency of Boeing Global Services and Support, until finally becoming the president and CEO of BDS in February 2016.

In 2018, Caret was included in Fortune's Most Powerful Women list for the second consecutive year.

In 2022, Caret retired as president of BDS.
