= GE Home & Business Solutions =

Division of General Electric from 2007 to 2014

GE Appliances and Lighting
- Formerly: GE Home & Business Solutions (2007–2013)
- Type: Division of General Electric
- Industry: Appliances
- Founded: August 1, 2007; 18 years ago
- Defunct: 2014
- Fate: Closed following a proposal to sell off GE Appliances
- Key people: Charlene T. Begley (President and CEO)

GE Home & Business Solutions was a division of General Electric from 2007 to 2014. In 2013 it was renamed GE Appliances & Lighting.

== History ==
On 1 August 2007 GE announced the formation of GE Enterprise Solutions, consisting of the various GE Industrial businesses other than GE Consumer & Industrial, as well as GE Power Quality. Charlene T. Begley was named president and CEO of the division.

== Operations ==
GE Home & Business Solutions had three primary sub businesses:

- GE Appliances
- GE Lighting
- GE Intelligent Platforms

GE Intelligent Platforms was moved under GE's Energy Management business in 2012, leaving just Appliances and Lighting.

Following the proposed sale of GE Appliances to Electrolux in September 2014, GE Appliances & Lighting ceased to exist. As of October 1, 2015, this transaction has not closed due to US antitrust action. Eventually GE Appliances was sold to Haier in June 2016. On 15 September 2014, GE Lighting moved under the 'Growth and Innovation' division of GE and sold to Savant Systems in 2020.
