= George David =

American businessman

George Alfred Lawrence David (born April 7, 1942) is the former chairman and chief executive officer of United Technologies Corporation.

== Early life and career ==
David was born in Pennsylvania on 7 April 1942. His mother's name was Margaret; his father, Charles Wendell, was the director of libraries at the University of Pennsylvania and one of America's first Rhodes scholars. David left home after he graduated from high school in 1962 and enrolled in Harvard University on a full scholarship. He received his B.A. from Harvard and M.B.A. from the University of Virginia's Darden Graduate School of Business Administration. He worked for the Boston Consulting Group.

In 1975 David began working for Otis Elevator Co., which was taken over by United Technologies Corp that same year. He became Otis' president in 1986.

David was elected UTC’s president in 1992 and chief executive officer in 1994.

In 2007, his last full year as chief executive of UTC, David reaped $65 million in total compensation.

=== Directorships ===
He is a board member of Citigroup, a member of The Business Council and the Business Roundtable, and Vice Chairman of the Peterson Institute for International Economics. He has served on the boards of the Graduate Business School at the University of Virginia, the National Minority Supplier Development Council, the U.S.-ASEAN Business Council, the Transatlantic Business Dialogue and the Wadsworth Atheneum Museum of Art.

=== Accolades ===
In 1999, the Russian Federation awarded David with the Order of Friendship for his contributions to the nation’s economy, particularly to its aerospace industry. In 2001, he received the Air Force Association's John R. Alison Award for contributions to national defense by an industrial leader. In 2002, France named him to its Legion of Honor.

In 2000, he was named as one of America's Most Powerful People by Forbes magazine; and CEO of the Year by Industry Week in 2003.

He was awarded "CEO of the Year 2005" by Chief Executive Magazine.

== Personal life ==
David married his high school sweetheart and adopted three children with her. They divorced after thirty years.

In 2009, David divorced his second wife Marie Douglas-David, whom he had married in 2002. She contested a $43 million postnuptial agreement and requested a settlement of approximately $100 million. Marie Douglas-David ended up with $5 million.

In July 2012, David married Wendy Touton, within hours of his yachting victory in the 2012 Newport Bermuda Race.

=== Sportsman ===
A member of the New York Yacht Club and the Royal Yacht Squadron, he is a yachtsman and racer campaigning his R/P 90 named Rambler (formerly Alfa Romeo I, ex-Shockwave) in regattas.

David then owned the Juan Kouyoumdjian-designed Rambler 100. The yacht capsized during the 2011 Fastnet race because her canting keel failed. All crew, including David and Wendy Touton, were rescued.

In 2012 Rambler broke the Newport to Bermuda Race record, shaving 14 hours off the previous fastest time recorded in the 635 mile race.

In December 2014 David launched a shorter yacht, Rambler 88 which was again designed by Kouyoumdjian.

Business positions
| Preceded by Robert F. Daniell | CEO of United Technologies Corporation; April 18, 1994 – April 8, 2008 | Succeeded by Louis R. Chênevert |
