= CIAT Group =

French HVAC equipment manufacturer

- Founded: 1934
- Founder: Jean Falconnier
- Headquarters: Culoz; Ain
- Website: ciat.com/en/eu/

The Compagnie Industrielle d'Applications Thermiques, or CIAT Group, is an HVAC equipment manufacturer, founded in 1934.

The headquarters and main industrial site are located in France, in Culoz department of Ain, between Lyon and Geneva. A second large industrial facility is located in Montilla, in Cordoba, Spain, where several HVAC products, such as rooftop units, are manufactured and engineered. A large research and development center including a test laboratory, is also present there.

== History ==
The CIAT Group was founded by Jean Falconnier in 1934. In 1984, his son, Jean-Louis Falconnier, took over the company. Following his passing in 2005, leadership transitioned to his brother, Jean-Pierre Falconnier. The company was acquired by United States-based United Technologies Corporation (UTC) in 2015.
