= Collins Aerospace =

Aerospace manufacturer

- Type: Subsidiary
- Industry: Aerospace and industrial
- Predecessors: Rockwell Collins; UTC Aerospace Systems
- Founded: 2018; 8 years ago
- Headquarters: Charlotte, North Carolina, U.S.
- Number of locations: 300+
- Revenue: ▲US$26.2 billion (2023)
- Number of employees: 80,000+ (2023)
- Parent: RTX Corporation
- Divisions: Aerostructures, Avionics, Interiors, Mechanical Systems, Missions Systems, Power & Controls
- Website: collinsaerospace.com

Collins Aerospace is an American aviation and defense technology company, which is one of the world's largest suppliers of aerospace and defense products. It was formed in 2018 from the merger between Rockwell Collins and UTC Aerospace Systems. Headquartered in Charlotte, North Carolina, it is a subsidiary of RTX Corporation.

SITA agreed to acquire Collins Aerospace's Airport Solutions division in October, 2026.

== History ==
On November 26, 2018, United Technologies announced the completion of its Rockwell Collins acquisition, after which it merged its newly acquired business with UTC Aerospace Systems to form Collins Aerospace. This acquisition controversially led to multiple class action lawsuits being filed against the company alleging that the executives deliberately misled its shareholders on the nature of the acquisition.

The new company reported $26 billion of combined sales in 2019 and is composed of 68,000 employees. In 2020 United Technologies merged with Raytheon Company to form Raytheon Technologies, which has since renamed itself to RTX Corporation.

In July 2023, Collins agreed to sell its actuation and flight controls business unit to French multinational Safran in an all-cash deal worth $1.8 billion. However, the Italian government used its Golden Share in Microtecnica to veto the sale in the belief it would give Safran the commercial ability to sabotage Eurofighter components production. RTX is legally challenging the use of the veto.

On January 24, 2024, Collins announced an investment of over £16 million at its Kilkeel site in Co Down for developing advanced passenger seating for wide-body and twin-aisle aircraft. This investment was announced by Joe Kennedy III, US Special Envoy to Northern Ireland for Economic Affairs.

== Products ==
Collins Aerospace deals with:

- designing,
- manufacturing and
- servicing

systems and components for:

- commercial aviation,
- business aviation,
- military and defense,
- helicopters,
- space,
- airports, and
- other industries.

Collins Aerospace has six strategic business units:

- Aerostructures,
- Avionics,
- Interiors,
- Missions Systems, and
- Power & Controls.

=== Ithaco Space Systems, Inc. ===
Collins Aerospace was the owner of Ithaco Space Systems, Inc., formerly owned by Goodrich Company and its successor UTC Aerospace Systems. In September 2020, Raytheon Technologies Corp. (NYSE: RTX) completes the sale of its electro-optics technology business headquartered in Danbury, Connecticut to AMERGINT Technologies Holdings, Inc. (ATH). The business is renamed Danbury Mission Technologies (Danbury). Andreas Nonnenmacher, President of Danbury Mission Technologies, concurrently assumes responsibilities as President of ATH. The business is reported to have 530 employees at the time of its acquisition.

In addition to over 100 U.S. satellites, equipment made by Ithaco has flown on:

- Japanese,
- Canadian,
- French,
- German,
- Spanish,
- Swedish, and
- Argentinean

spacecraft. Ithaco became notable for having manufactured the reaction wheels of:

- the Kepler spacecraft,
- the Hayabusa spacecraft,
- the Mesosphere Energetics and Dynamics (TIMED) satellite, and
- the Dawn spacecraft, which developed problems or even failed.

=== FlightAware ===
On August 20, 2021, Collins Aerospace announced the acquisition of FlightAware for an undisclosed amount. FlightAware is a technology company that provides real-time, historical, and predictive flight data and flight-tracking products.

=== Cyberattack ===
In September 2025, the company suffered a cyberattack on their Muse software, which affected multiple airlines and airports, including London's Heathrow Airport, Brussels Airport, Berlin Brandenburg Airport and Dublin Airport. They also suffered an attack in June 2024, though it had a much smaller impact at Heathrow it was more widespread and affected several European airports. In October 2025, the Everest ransomware group claimed responsibility for the breach on their website.

=== Awards & Recognition ===
- 2016 Outstanding Awards: B/E Aerospace BV-Philippine Branch held by Don Emilio Abello Energy Efficiency Award
- 2020 Top Exporter Award, Dec 03, held by Export Development Council
- EH&S Spirit Award for Exemplary Commitment to Environmental Health and Safety
- 2021 and 2023 recipient of the Best Companies to Work for in Asia awarded by HR Asia
- 2024 PCAPI Region IVA Chapter Excellence Award for Innovative Solutions in Energy and Water Conservation

== See also ==
- List of aircraft propeller manufacturers
- LucasVarity
- Pratt & Whitney
