= United Technologies =

American multinational conglomerate (1934–2020)

United Technologies Corporation
- Type: Public
- Traded as: NYSE: UTX
- Industry: Conglomerate
- Predecessor: United Aircraft
- Founded: September 26, 1934 (as United Aircraft Corporation); May 1, 1975 (as United Technologies Corporation)
- Founder: Frederick Rentschler (for the United Aircraft line)
- Defunct: April 3, 2020
- Fate: Merged with Raytheon to form RTX; Otis and Carrier spun off.
- Successors: RTX Corporation; Otis Worldwide; Carrier Global
- Headquarters: Farmington, Connecticut, United States
- Area served: Worldwide
- Key people: Gregory J. Hayes; (president, chairman and CEO)
- Revenue: US$71.31 Billion (2019)

United Technologies Corporation (UTC) was an American multinational conglomerate headquartered in Farmington, Connecticut. It researched, developed, and manufactured products in numerous areas, including aircraft engines, aerospace systems, HVAC, elevators and escalators, fire and security, building automation, and industrial products, among others. UTC was also a large military contractor, getting about 10% of its revenue from the U.S. government. In April 2020, UTC merged with the Raytheon Company to form Raytheon Technologies, later renamed RTX Corporation.

== History ==
=== 1970s and 1980s ===
In 1974, Harry Jack Gray left Litton Industries to become the CEO of United Aircraft. He pursued a strategy of growth and diversification, changing the parent corporation's name to United Technologies Corporation (UTC) in 1975 to reflect the intent to diversify into numerous high tech fields beyond aerospace. (The change became official on May 1, 1975.) The diversification was partially to balance civilian business against any overreliance on military business. UTC became a mergers and acquisitions (M&A)–focused organization, with various forced takeovers of unwilling smaller corporations. The next year (1976), UTC forcibly acquired Otis Elevator. In 1979, Carrier Refrigeration and Mostek were acquired; the Carrier deal was forcible, while the Mostek deal was a white knight move against hostile takeover designs by Gould.

At one point, the military portion of UTC's business, whose sensitivity to "excess profits" and boom/bust demand drove UTC to diversify away from it, actually carried the weight of losses incurred by the commercial M&A side of the business. Although M&A activity was not new to United Aircraft, the M&A activity of the 1970s and 1980s was higher-stakes and arguably unfocused. Rather than aviation being the central theme of UTC businesses, high tech (of any type) was the new theme. Some Wall Street watchers questioned the true value of M&A at almost any price, seemingly for its own sake.

Mostek was sold in 1985 to the French electronics company Thomson.

In 2007, UTC opened the Hawk Works, a Rapid Prototyping and Military Derivatives Completion Center (RPMDCC) located west of the Elmira-Corning Regional Airport in Big Flats, New York.

In March 2008, UTC made a $2.63 billion bid to acquire Diebold, a Canton, Ohio based manufacturer of banking and voting machines. Diebold rejected the buyout bid as inadequate.

In April 2010, UTC announced that it was investing €15 million ($20 million) to set up the United Technologies Research Centre Ireland at University College Cork’s Tyndall National Institute which would carry out research on energy and security systems.

In June 2012, it was discovered that UTC sold military technology to the Chinese. For pleading guilty to violating the Arms Export Control Act and making false statements, United Technologies and its subsidiaries were fined $75 million.

In February 2013, UTC Power was sold to ClearEdge Power.

In October 2014, Toshiba and United Technologies made a deal to expand their joint venture outside Japan.

In February 2016, UTC subsidiary Carrier Air Conditioner announced to employees at its Indianapolis and Huntington plants, that Carrier is moving manufacturing to Mexico: "The best way to stay competitive and protect the business for long-term is to move production from our facility in Indianapolis to Monterrey, Mexico. " In December, Carrier agreed to keep the Indianapolis plant open, keeping 700 jobs in Indianapolis. The plant in Huntington, Indiana would still close their doors, leaving 700 employees jobless.

In June 2019, United Technologies announced the intention to merge with defense contractor Raytheon to form Raytheon Technologies Corporation. The combined company, valued at more than $100 billion after planned spinoffs, would be the world's second-largest aerospace-and-defense company by sales behind Boeing. Although UTC was the nominal survivor, the merged company was headquartered at legacy Raytheon's former base in Waltham, Massachusetts. The merger was completed in April 2020.

In March 2020, United Technologies Corporation announced the separations of Carrier Global and Otis Worldwide.

=== Executive history ===
In April 2008, Louis Chênevert succeeded George David as the company's chief executive officer (CEO). Chênevert served until 2014, when he was succeeded by Gregory Hayes.

The chief financial officer's (CFO) position was held by Gregory Hayes until 2014, when he succeeded Louis Chênevert as CEO. The chairman of the board of directors (chairperson) position went to Louis Chênevert, then the company's CEO, in January 2010, succeeding George David.

== Finances ==
For the fiscal year 2017, United Technologies reported earnings of US$4.552 billion, with an annual revenue of US$59.837 billion, an increase of 4.5% over the previous fiscal cycle. United Technologies shares traded at over $114 per share, and its market capitalization was valued at US$98.6 billion in October 2018. UTC ranked No. 51 in the 2018 Fortune 500 list of the largest United States corporations by total revenue.

Year	Revenue in mil. USD$	Net income in mil. USD$	Total Assets in mil. USD$	Price per Share in USD$	Employees
2005	42,725	3,069	45,925	38.42	
2006	47,829	3,732	47,141	46.56	
2007	55,716	4,224	54,575	54.94	
2008	59,119	4,689	56,837	49.91	
2009	52,425	3,829	55,762	44.36	
2010	52,275	4,373	58,493	58.86	
2011	55,754	4,979	61,452	67.41	
2012	57,708	5,130	89,409	67.87	
2013	56,600	5,721	90,594	87.83	212,000
2014	57,900	6,220	91,206	101.42	211,000
2015	56,098	7,608	87,484	99.09	197,000
2016	57,244	5,055	89,706	96.15	205,000
2017	59,837	4,552	96,920	114.01	205,000

== Business units ==
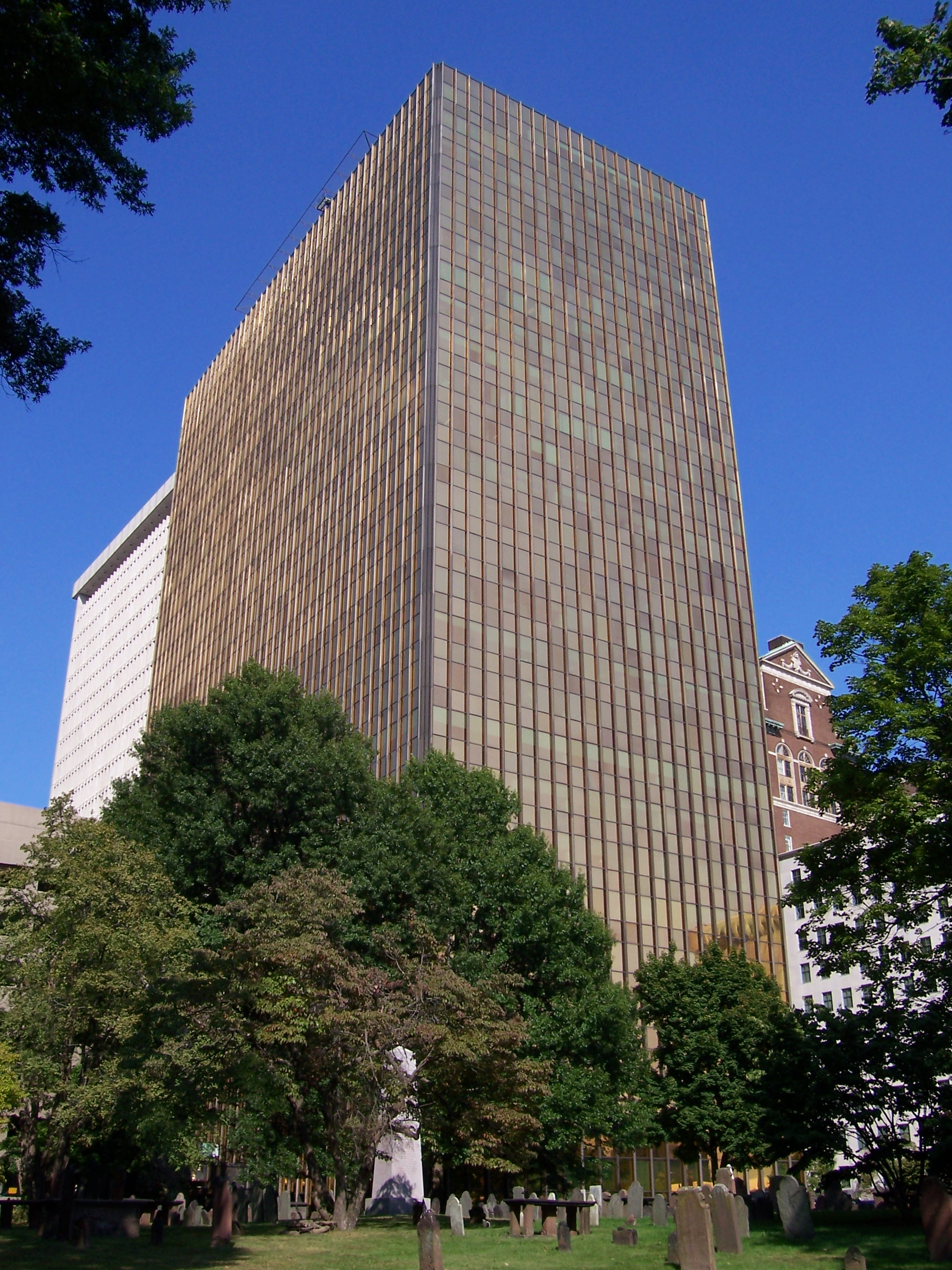
Hartford's Gold Building served as UTC's headquarters from 1975 to 2015.

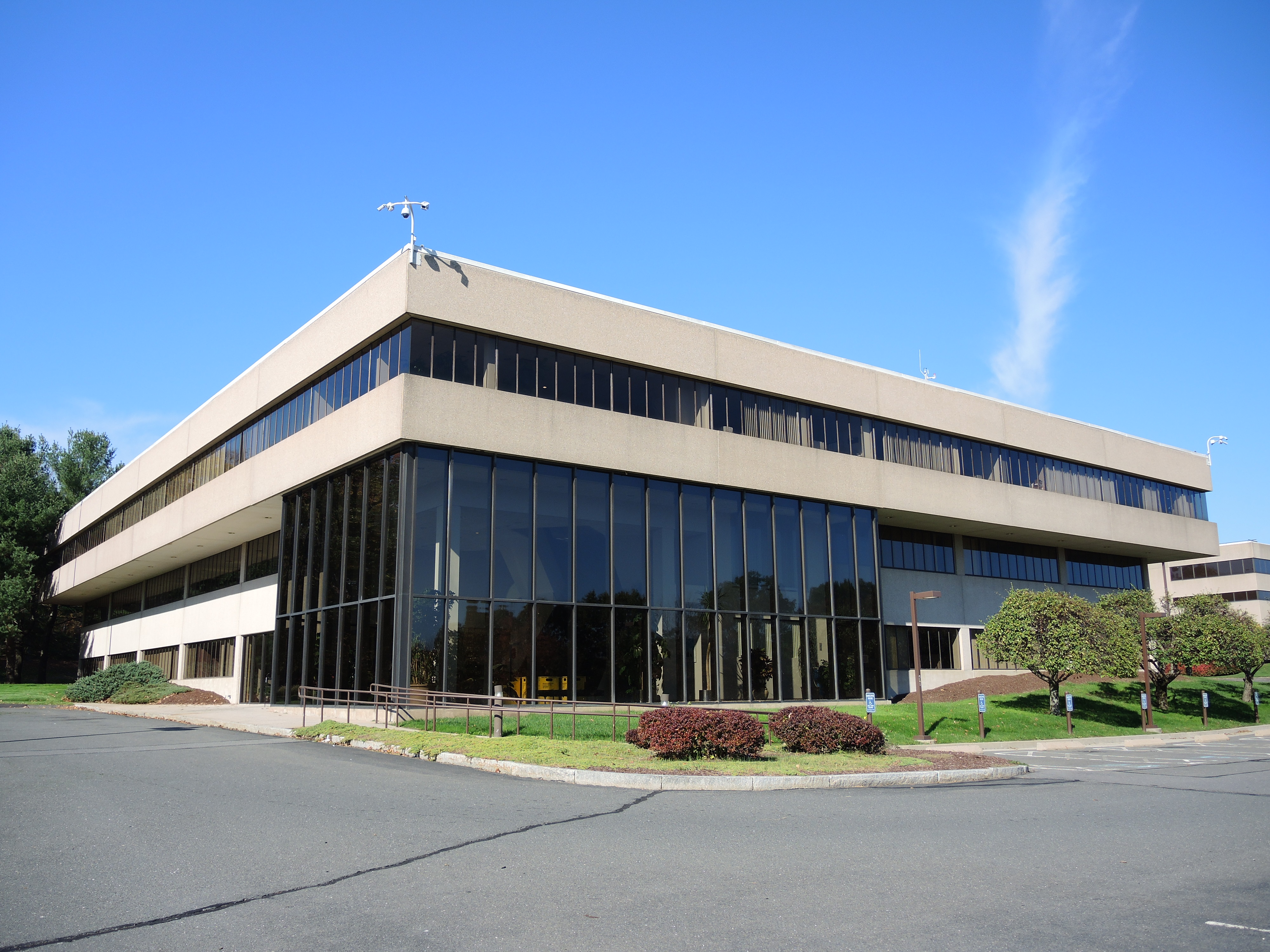
Otis Elevator's former headquarters served as UTC's headquarters from 2015 to 2020.

- Otis Elevator Company: Manufacturer, installer, and servicer of elevators, escalators, and moving walkways.
- Pratt & Whitney: Designs and builds aircraft engines and gas turbines.
  - Pratt & Whitney Canada
- Collins Aerospace: Designs and manufactures aerospace systems for commercial, regional, corporate and military aircraft; a major supplier for international space programs. Provides industrial products for the hydrocarbon, chemical, and food processing industries, construction and mining companies. Collins Aerospace was formed following UTC's acquisition of Rockwell Collins in 2018, by combining the newly acquired business with UTC Aerospace Systems, which itself was the result of a 2012 merger of Hamilton Sundstrand and the Goodrich Corporation.
- UTC Climate, Controls & Security: Makes fire detection and suppression systems, access control systems, and security alarm systems; provides security system integration and monitoring services.
  - Carrier: A global manufacturer of heating, ventilation, air conditioning, and refrigeration systems.
    - NORESCO
  - Chubb: a fire and security systems manufacturer.
- United Technologies Research Center (UTRC): A centralized research facility that supports all UTC business units in developing new technologies and processes. Succeeded by the RTX Technology Research Center in 2020.

=== Acquisitions ===
- 1999: Sundstrand Corporation, merged into UTC's Hamilton Standard unit to form Hamilton Sundstrand.
- 2003, Chubb Security.
- 2004, Schweizer Aircraft Corporation planned to be operated as a wholly owned subsidiary under their Sikorsky Aircraft division.
- 2005, Kidde.
- 2005, Boeing's Rocketdyne division, which was merged into the Pratt & Whitney business unit and renamed Pratt & Whitney Rocketdyne (later sold to Aerojet) and merged into Aerojet Rocketdyne.
- 2008, NORESCO, an energy service company, acquired by UTC's Carrier Corporation division.
- 2009, a 49.5% stake in Clipper Windpower for $206 million. In 2010, UTC agreed with Clipper to acquire the rest of the company.
- 2010 General Electric's security equipment business for US$1.8 billion, to support UTC's Fire & Security unit.
- 2011, UTC acquired a $18.4 billion deal (including $1.9 billion in net debt assumed) for aircraft components maker Goodrich Corporation.
- 2012, United Technologies acquired Goodrich and merged it with Hamilton Sundstrand; the resulting organization is UTC Aerospace Systems
- 2015, UTC Building & Industrial Systems completed the acquisition of CIAT Group, a leading HVAC manufacturing company in France. In November, Lockheed Martin completed its $9.0 billion acquisition of Sikorsky Aircraft.
- 2017, UTC proposed to acquire Rockwell Collins in cash and stock for $23 billion, $30 billion including Rockwell Collins' net debt, for $500+ million of synergies expected by year four. In 2018, the company announced the Rockwell Collins deal had closed, and that it will split into three independent companies. Pratt and Whitney and the newly formed Collins Aerospace will remain under United Technologies, while Otis Elevator and UTC Climate, Controls & Security (doing business as Carrier) will be spun off as two independent companies.

=== Former businesses ===
- Clipper Windpower: A maker of wind turbines, acquired in 2010, sold in 2012 to Platinum Equity LLC.
- Hamilton Standard: became part of Hamilton Sundstrand, then UTC Aerospace Systems, now Collins Aerospace
- Hamilton Test Systems: developer of vehicle emission test equipment, sold to Georgetown Partners in 1990
- Inmont: paint and resins, sold to BASF
- Kidde: manufacturer of smoke alarms, carbon monoxide alarms and fire extinguishers. Now a subsidiary of UTC spin-off, Carrier
- Mostek semiconductor: from 1979 to 1985
- Norden Systems: manufacturer of electronics systems for military use, acquired in 1958, sold to Westinghouse in 1994
- Pratt & Whitney Rocketdyne: sold in June 2013 and now part of GenCorp
- Sikorsky Aircraft: helicopters manufacturer; sold to Lockheed Martin
  - PZL Mielec
- Turbo Power and Marine Systems, Inc: a manufacturer of simple-cycle electrical power generation units of 25 MW and 50 MW. Renamed Pratt & Whitney Power Systems in 2000, sold to Mitsubishi Heavy Industries in May 2013 and is now a MHI group company named PW Power Systems, Inc.
- UT Automotive: now a division of Lear Corporation
- UT Communications: manufacturer of telephone equipment, sold to Memorex in 1985
- UTC Power: a manufacturer of distributed power generation systems and fuel cells for commercial, transportation, and space and defense applications. Sold to ClearEdge Power in February 2013.

== Political contributions ==
During the 2004 election cycle, UTC was the sixth largest defense industry donor to political campaigns, contributing a total of $789,561; 64% went to Republicans. In the 2006 election cycle, UTC was again the sixth largest donor to federal candidates and political parties; 53% of the funds were contributed to Republicans, 35% percent to Democrats;

In 2005, the firm was among 53 entities that contributed the maximum of $250,000 to the second inauguration of President George W. Bush.

== Philanthropy ==
In 1981, a contribution from UTC made possible the exhibition "Paris/Magnum: Photographs 1935–1981", featuring photographs of Paris taken by photographers of Magnum Photos, the agency founded in 1947 by Robert Capa, George Rodger, Henri Cartier-Bresson, William Vandivert, and David Seymour. A volume of the same title, with text by Irwin Shaw and an introduction by Inge Morath, was also published in 1981.

UTC is the sponsor of the exhibition "Aphrodite and the Gods of Love" at Boston's Museum of Fine Arts that opened in fall 2011.

The firm and its subsidiaries are major contributors to museums such as the New England Air Museum.

In April 2015, UTC signed an education partnership agreement with the China Friendship Foundation for Peace and Development, a united front organization under the control of the Chinese People's Association for Friendship with Foreign Countries.

== Environmental record ==
Researchers at the University of Massachusetts Amherst have identified UTC as the 38th-largest corporate producer of air pollution in the United States as of 2008. UTC released roughly 110,000 pounds (50,000 kg) of toxic chemicals annually into the atmosphere including manganese, nickel, chromium and related compounds.

In the 2016 University of Massachusetts Amherst Toxic 100 Air Polluters Index, UTC was ranked 9th by a toxicity population exposure score. It was also reported they release 60,000 pounds (27,200 kg) of toxins into the air.

== See also ==
- Top 100 US Federal Contractors
- Honor Award from the National Building Museum
- Yuzuru Ito
- Eva Collins, academic and lobbyist

== Bibliography ==
- Fernandez, Ronald (1983), Excess Profits: The Rise of United Technologies, Boston: Addison-Wesley, ISBN 9780201104844.
- Holland, Max (1989), When the Machine Stopped: A Cautionary Tale from Industrial America, Boston: Harvard Business School Press, ISBN 978-0-87584-208-0, OCLC 246343673.
