= Herman Kahn =

American futurist (1922–1983)

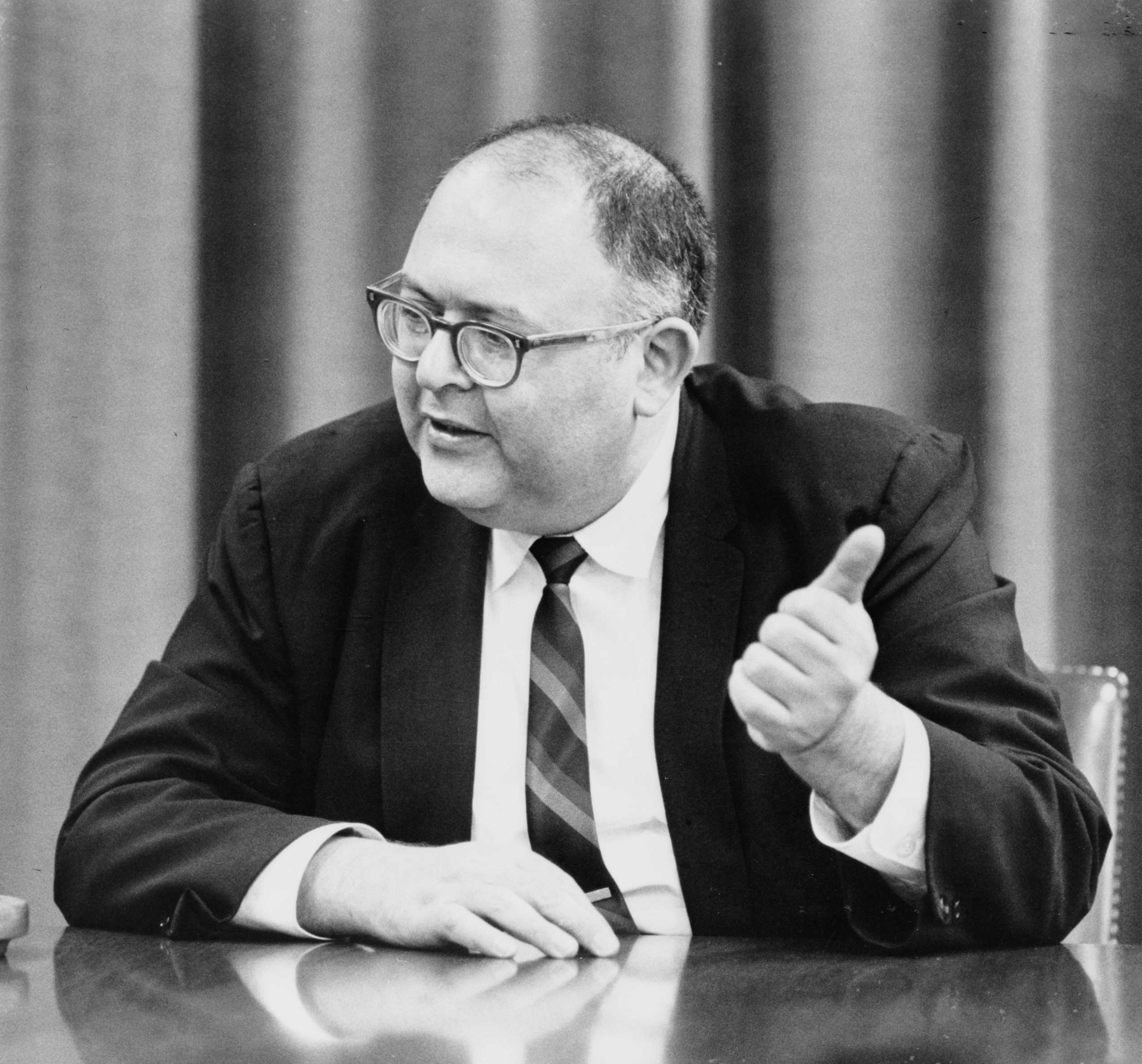
- Kahn in 1965
- Born: February 15, 1922; Bayonne, New Jersey, U.S.
- Died: July 7, 1983 (aged 61); Chappaqua, New York, U.S.
- Education: University of California, Los Angeles (BS); California Institute of Technology (MS)
- Occupations: Futurist; Military strategist; Systems theorist
- Known for: Nuclear strategy
- Notable work: On Thermonuclear War

Herman Kahn (February 15, 1922 – July 7, 1983) was an American physicist and a founding member of the Hudson Institute, regarded as an eminent futurist of the latter part of the twentieth century.

He originally came to prominence as a military strategist and systems theorist while employed at the RAND Corporation. There, he analyzed the likely consequences of nuclear war and recommended ways to improve survivability during the Cold War. Kahn posited the idea of a "winnable" nuclear exchange in his 1960 book On Thermonuclear War, for which he was one of the historical inspirations for the eponymous character of Stanley Kubrick's classic black comedy film satire Dr. Strangelove. In his commentary for Fail Safe, director Sidney Lumet remarked that the Professor Groeteschele character is also based on Herman Kahn.

Kahn's theories contributed to the development of the nuclear strategy of the United States.

== Early life and education ==
Kahn was born in Bayonne, New Jersey, as one of three sons to Yetta (née Koslowsky) and Abraham Kahn, a tailor. His parents were Jewish immigrants from Poland. He was raised in the Bronx, then in Los Angeles following his parents' divorce in 1932. He grew up in poverty in Los Angeles and his mother depended upon social assistance to support her children.

Raised Jewish, he later identified as an atheist. Kahn graduated from Fairfax High School in 1940 and enlisted in the United States Army in May 1943, serving during the Burma campaign in World War II in a non-combat capacity as a telephone lineman. He did not see combat during the war.

He received a Bachelor of Science at UCLA and briefly attended Caltech to pursue a doctorate before dropping out with a Master of Science due to financial constraints. He joined the RAND Corporation as a mathematician after being recruited by fellow physicist Samuel Cohen.

== Lawrence Livermore National Laboratory ==
He worked at the Lawrence Livermore National Laboratory on the development of the hydrogen bomb. His work was cut short when he was denounced by an anonymous informer to the Federal Bureau of Investigation as a communist. In an anonymous letter to the Federal Bureau of Investigation, the denouncer accused Kahn of being a member of a communist front organization, having communist leanings and being a Soviet spy.

As a result of the FBI investigation, Kahn lost his security clearance to work on the hydrogen bomb, which forced him to turn full time to the RAND corporation to support himself. Though the FBI concluded that the allegations were the work of a malicious co-worker who disliked Kahn, his security clearance was not restored. Kahn was a liberal who was a member of the American Civil Liberties Union and the Americans for Democratic Action.

During the Red Scare of the late 1940s-early 1950s, American liberals were often denounced by conservatives for being "soft on Communism", which led to a number of liberals taking an extremely aggressive anti-communist posture to rebut such charges. Kahn was one such example as he went out of his way to take extreme anti-communist positions as to counter such allegations.

== RAND and Cold War theories ==
Kahn's major contributions were the several strategies he developed during the Cold War to contemplate "the unthinkable" – namely, nuclear warfare – by using applications of game theory. Kahn is often cited (with Pierre Wack) as a father of scenario planning. Kahn argued for deterrence and believed that if the Soviet Union believed that the United States had a second strike capability then it would offer greater deterrence, which he wrote in his paper titled "The Nature and Feasibility of War and Deterrence".

Kahn was greatly in favor of civil defense, urging that the government build a network of underground shelters across the nation to ensure that as many Americans as possible could survive a nuclear exchange with the Soviet Union. Kahn argued that the Soviet Union would be less likely to attack with nuclear weapons should such a network of bunkers exist, and should a Third World War break out, it could limit the American death toll from 30 million dead to 10 million dead. Kahn felt that it had to be shown that the United States was able and willing to fight a nuclear war as the best way of preventing war.

Unhappy at the way that the Eisenhower administration had rejected his plan for a civil defense programme for a nuclear war, Kahn took a leave of absence from the Rand Corporation in 1959 to go on a nation-wide lecture tour on the subject of civil defense. Unlike most of the intellectuals who served at the Rand Corporation who were known for their dull, dry style of speaking, Kahn was in the words of the American historian Alex Abella "a showman" whose charisma, charm, sense of humor and colorful speaking style made his lectures well attended. Kahn's style was to confront head-on the costs of a nuclear war as he declared in one of his lectures: "If 180 million dead is too high a price of punishing the Soviets for their aggression, what price would we be willing to pay?"

However, Kahn's lectures sometimes had the opposite effect from that he intended as he spoke frankly about how a nuclear war would kill hundreds of millions of people, which had the effect of persuading people that nuclear weapons should be banned, which was not Kahn's intention. Kahn's use of humor, his charisma and his brutally honest talk about the costs of a nuclear war often won audiences over to his point of view. The fact that Kahn did not seek to downplay the costs of nuclear warfare or use euphemisms as so many others did at the time gave him a reputation for being authentic and honest.

=== Black humor ===
About his use of morbid jokes in his lectures, Kahn stated: "I was trying to shake things up. I wasn't trying to shock, but I did state things provocatively and sometimes humorously". Some of his black humor was considered offensive as he argued that in the aftermath of a nuclear war would probably cause humans to mutate into something hideous, leading him to joke: "It is possible, isn't it, that parents will learn to love two-headed children twice as much?" Reflecting the fashionable theories of sexual psychoanalysis that sought to explain all human behavior as being sexually driven, Kahn joked in a lecture to a group of Air Force officers: "Gentlemen, you don't have a war plan, you have a war-gasm!"

Kahn's tendency to joke about how a nuclear war would kill hundreds of millions of people along with the survivors mutating into something grotesque led to charges that he was callous about the value of human life. About the charge that he was cold and callous, Kahn responded that in his view emotions were a weakness for leaders contemplating the prospect of a nuclear war, and what the United States needed were leaders like himself who were cold and calculating about the prospect of nuclear annihilation.

=== Theoretical bases ===
Kahn argued that a cold and calculating leader was more likely to make the correct decisions about the use of nuclear weapons than an emotional leader who would flinch at the prospect of a nuclear apocalypse, and accordingly make compromises that would damage the security interests of the United States. On the other extreme, there was always the possibility that the President would be excessively bellicose, aggressive and impulsive and likewise gratuitously start a nuclear war.

The bases of his work were systems theory and game theory as applied to economics and military strategy. Kahn argued that for deterrence to succeed, the Soviet Union had to be convinced that the United States had second-strike capability in order to leave the Politburo in no doubt that even a perfectly coordinated massive attack would guarantee a measure of retaliation that would leave them devastated as well:

At the minimum, an adequate deterrent for the United States must provide an objective basis for a Soviet calculation that would persuade them that, no matter how skillful or ingenious they were, an attack on the United States would lead to a very high risk if not certainty of large-scale destruction to Soviet civil society and military forces.

== On Thermonuclear War ==
Kahn was a poor writer and with the assistance of several ghostwriters turned his lectures into his best known book, On Thermonuclear War, which was published in 1960. On Thermonuclear War angered several of his colleagues at the Rand Corporation, who felt he plagiarized their ideas in his book. When Kahn presented a draft of On Thermonuclear War to Albert Wohlstetter for comments, the latter told Kahn: "There's only one thing to do with this, Herman. Burn it!"

In On Thermonuclear War, Kahn put forward what came to be his "most notorious idea", the Doomsday Machine, a computer that would set off an enormous stock of hydrogen bombs that would end all life on Earth if there was a nuclear attack on the United States or if there was an attempt to deactivate it. He argued that no-one would attempt to attack the United States if it possessed the Doomsday Machine (which would serve as a deterrent and thus preserve the peace). However, he admitted that there was always the possibility that a few "coding errors" in the computer might accidentally set off the Doomsday Machine.

Kahn had put forward the Doomsday Machine as a thought experiment intended to criticize the "massive retaliation" security doctrine of the Eisenhower administration that had been championed by the Secretary of State John Foster Dulles. In his thought experiment, Kahn explored a scenario where the Soviet Union would launch a nuclear strike against the United States with almost all of the Soviet missiles and bombers being shot down before hitting American cities with only five American cities being destroyed, which would nonetheless trigger the Doomsday Machine.

The American film director Stanley Kubrick had read On Thermonuclear War and was in contact with Kahn in the early 1960s. The Doomsday Machine in Kubrick's 1964 film Dr. Strangelove was based very closely on the Doomsday Machine in On Thermonuclear War with the only difference being that it was the Soviet Union rather than the United States that possessed the Doomsday Machine.

Reflecting his interests in civil defense, the longest sections in On Thermonuclear War were devoted to how a civil defense program could ensure that the United States could survive a nuclear war. He called for spending some $200 billion in building a network of underground concrete bunkers along with converting mines into shelters and encouraging Americans to build their own shelters under their homes. He downplayed the problems of radioactive fallout, saying that people could survive by living in the shelters and that only a relatively small number would experience genetic mutations.

Kahn argued that after World War 3, all food should be divided into grades labelled A, B, C, D and E based on their level of radioactivity. The highest quality A grade food with the least radioactivity would be provided only to children and pregnant women; the B grade food would be expensive food with some radioactivity would be available to anyone under the age of 50 who could afford it; the C grade food with a greater level of radioactivity would serve to keep the poor under the age of 50 alive; the D grade food with a higher level of radioactivity would be provided only to people over the age of 50 as Kahn wrote that "most of these people would die of other causes before they got cancer"; and the E grade food with the most radioactivity would be provided only to animals.

=== Critical reception ===
Reviews for On Thermonuclear War were highly mixed, but the book was a bestseller, selling 14,000 copies in the first two months after publication. The most savage response to On Thermonuclear War was a review in The Scientific American by the American mathematician James R. Newman who called the book "a moral tract on mass murder: how to plan it, how to commit it, how to get away with it, how to justify it". The British philosopher and mathematician Bertrand Russell offered a backhanded compliment in his ostensibly positive review of On Thermonuclear War, declaring that Kahn in his section of his book dealing with a post nuclear war world had vividly and conclusively proved why a nuclear war should never be fought. Likewise, the American Socialist Norman Thomas wrote in his review of On Thermonuclear War that: "Mr. Kahn deserves attention from of us who believe that universal disarmament is our sole valid hope for a decent existence of the human race".

In 1962, Kahn published a 16-step escalation ladder. By 1965 he had developed this into a 44-step ladder.

== Hudson Institute ==
In 1961, Kahn, Max Singer and Oscar Ruebhausen founded the Hudson Institute, a neoconservative think tank initially located in Croton-on-Hudson, New York, where Kahn was living at the time. He recruited sociologist Daniel Bell, political philosopher Raymond Aron and novelist Ralph Ellison (author of the 1952 classic Invisible Man).

== The Year 2000 ==
In 1967, Herman Kahn and Anthony J. Wiener published The Year 2000: A Framework for Speculation on the Next Thirty-Three Years, which included contributions from staff members of the Hudson Institute and an introduction by Daniel Bell. Table XVIII in the document contains a list called "One Hundred Technical Innovations Very Likely in the Last Third of the Twentieth Century". The first ten predictions were:

1. Multiple applications of lasers
2. Extreme high-strength structural materials
3. New or improved superperformance fabrics
4. New or improved materials for equipment and appliances
5. New airborne vehicles (ground-effect vehicles, giant or supersonic jets, VTOL, STOL)
6. Extensive commercial applications of shaped-charge explosives
7. More reliable and longer-range weather forecasting
8. Extensive and/or intensive expansion of tropical agriculture and forestry
9. New sources of power for fixed installations
10. New sources of power for ground transportation

== Later years ==
In Kahn's view, capitalism and technology held nearly boundless potential for progress, while the colonization of space lay in the near, not the distant, future. Kahn's 1976 book The Next 200 Years, written with William Brown and Leon Martel, presented an optimistic scenario of economic conditions in the year 2176. He also wrote a number of books extrapolating the future of the American, Japanese and Australian economies and several works on systems theory, including the well-received 1957 monograph Techniques of System Analysis. In 1968, Kahn published a book, Can We Win In Vietnam?, answering in the affirmative.

=== Angola ===
Kahn started to promote ideas that many regarded as outlandish such as a "flying think-tank" over the Portuguese colony of Angola as he deemed airborne brain-storming in order to develop ideas for making Portuguese colonialism more popular in Angola at a time when the Portuguese were having much difficulty in hanging onto Angola in the face of a guerilla war for independence. In September 1969, Kahn took part in his "flying think-tank" as he and a group of American scholars visited Angola to gather ideas to help the Portuguese win the war.

Kahn visited Angola as a guest of the Portuguese government and afterwards spoke at a conference in Estoril about finding the best ways for Portugal to win the war. In Angola, the Portuguese fought from 1961 to 1975 three rival guerrilla movements, namely the UNITA (União Nacional para a Independência Total de Angola-National Union for the Total Independence of Angola), the FNLA (Frente Nacional de Libertação de Angola-National Front for the Liberation of Angola), and the MPLA (Movimento Popular de Libertação de Angola-People's Movement for the Liberation of Angola), which somewhat limited the effectiveness of the guerrillas. At the end of his visit to Angola, Kahn predicated the Portuguese would win the war as he argued that the Angolans would ultimately see that was in their own best interest to remain a colony rather be ruled by one of the "small cliques" that dominated the three guerrilla movements.

Kahn suggested that the Portuguese state should purchase computers to create a database containing the names, addresses and political views of every single Angolan as a way to eliminate support for the guerrillas. In a paper he wrote after his visit, Kahn stated that his plans for a computer for a national identity register had been turned down by the United States government as "too authoritarian", but it was quite practical for the dictatorial Estado Novo regime that ruled Portugal. He argued that his suggestion for a computerized identity register was "the best police instrument" available in Angola as it created the possibility of arresting all the supporters of FNLA, UNITA and the MPLA.

Kahn also suggested that the best way of persuading the Angolans to abandon their dreams of independence was economic development, which he divided into three categories, which were "business as usual", "cut and run" and "go for broke". Kahn defined "business as usual" as continuing with the present economic course; "cut and run" as development of industries that unskilled African labor would be unable to operate; and "go for broke" as the rapid development of large-scale industries.

Kahn favored the last option, arguing that Portuguese should start building a series of dams along the Congo river to provide hydroelectricity for Angola, which he stated would be "the first bridge between an African state [i.e the Congo] and an [sic] European province" [i.e. Angola]. Kahn also recommended that the Portuguese concentrate more on developing the oil industry in Angola along with greater cattle ranching as way to provide more better jobs for the Angolans. Kahn's suggestions were not acted upon as his proposals were beyond the financial capacity of the Portuguese state.

Despite Kahn's efforts, the Portuguese granted independence to all their African colonies in 1975. The Estado Novo regime was overthrown in the Carnation Revolution in 1974 as the Portuguese people had grown tired of seeming endless wars to hang on to their colonies of Angola, Portuguese Guinea (modern Guinea-Bissau) and Portuguese East Africa (modern Mozambique), and the new government promptly promised to end the wars by granting independence, which was done the next year.

=== Brazil ===
Kahn also tried starting in 1968 to interest the Brazilian military government into a scheme to dam and develop the entire Amazon river basin into the "Great Lakes of South America", which would provided waterways to link up all of South America. Kahn argued turning the Amazon into a series of huge artificial lakes would stimulate trade in South America by lowering transportation costs as the envisioned system of artificial lakes would make it possible to ship goods via ships. To create his Great Lakes, Kahn called for building a series of dams along the Amazon river, which would also provide Brazil with cheap hydroelectricity. In particular, Kahn argued that his "Great Lakes" project would link up the more industrial and developed cities in South America, namely Buenos Aires in Argentina, São Paulo in Brazil, and Montevideo in Uruguay with the resource-rich, but poor nations of Colombia, Venezuela, Ecuador, Peru and Bolivia.

He also predicated that the Great Lakes project would spur logging, oil development, and agriculture in all of the nearby areas. Finally, he argued developed the previously inaccessible areas of Amazonia would lead to the development of new cities and towns as he predicated that the vast jungles of Amazonia would be turned into equally vast urban areas. In a 1968 paper, Kahn called his Great Lakes plan "the catalyzing agent of the economic and social development of South America". Kahn also tried to promote a scheme for the government of Colombia to build a system of canals, artificial lakes, and dredging up rivers as part of his "Great Lakes of South America" project. Kahn's plans met with strong opposition from the Brazilian Ministry of Foreign Affairs-known in Brazil as the Itamarty-who saw his Great Lakes plans as a scheme for American neo-colonial domination of Amazonia.

In 1968, one Itamarty diplomat in opposition to Kahn's plans quoted the remark by Otto von Bismarck that "natural resources in the hands of nations that do not want or cannot exploit them, cease to constitute assets and become threats to those that possess them". Brazil was ruled by a military dictatorship from 1964 to 1985, which limited the scope for protest, but despite these limitations, Kahn's proposed plans for Amazonia led to the founding of the environmentalist group CNNDA (Companha Nacional para Defesa e o Desenvolvimento de Amazônia-National Campaign for the Defense and Development of the Amazon), one of the first environmentalist groups in Brazil. The CNNDA brought together environmentalists, scientists, and crucially a number of retired officers who had served in the Brazilian Expeditionary Force that fought in Italy in World War Two, which gave the CNNDA a degree of protection. The president of the CNNDA was the conservative historian Arthur Cesar Ferreira Reis, who served as the governor of the Amazonas state from 1964 to 1967. In 1969, a book by Reis, A Amazônia Brasileira e a Cobiça Internacional (The Brazilian Amazon and International Greed), was published. In A Amazônia Brasileira e a Cobiça Internacional, Reis attacked Kahn's plans for Amazonia as a disguised way to take away Amazonia from Brazil.

=== Views on Japan ===
In 1970, Kahn published the book The Emerging Japanese Superstate in which he claimed that Japan would play a large role in the world equal to the Soviet Union and the United States. In the book, he claimed that Japan would pursue obtaining nuclear weapons and that it would pass the United States in per-capita income by 1990, and likely equal it in gross national product by 2000.

During the mid-1970s, when South Korea's GDP per capita was one of the lowest in the world, Kahn predicted that the country would become one of the top 10 most powerful countries in the world by the year 2000. When the Arab "oil shock" of 1973-1974 threw the global economy into the steepest recession since the Great Depression, Kahn argued that North America needed "energy independence" from the turbulent Middle East and in November 1973 presented a scheme to the Canadian cabinet for developing the Athabasca oil sands.

He was greatly helped by the fact that the director of the Hudson Institute's Canadian subsidy, Marie-Josée Drouin was also the former special executive assistant to a federal cabinet minister, Jean-Pierre Goyer. Drouin was also the mistress of Goyer, whom he described as his "common law wife" despite the fact that he was already married. Goyer was to strenuously deny that he knew Kahn through Drouin, and instead maintained he had a random "chance meeting" with Kahn at the Dorval Airport in Montreal in the fall of 1973, where Kahn convinced him of the merits of his plan.

During the "so-called chance meeting" as it was dubbed at the time, Kahn expounded to Goyer on the virtues of exploiting the Athabasca oil sands as the solution to the oil crisis. Kahn's plan called for Canada to turn over the Athabasca oil sands to a consortium of American, European and Japanese companies who would be allowed to develop and exploit oil sands on a "wartime" basis with the workforce to consist of South Korean temporary workers. Kahn estimated that it would cost $20 billion US to develop the Athabasca oil sands to the point of providing enough oil to give North America "energy independence".

Kahn greatly impressed Goyer, the minister of supply in Pierre Trudeau's government, who forcefully advocated acceptance of his scheme, but the rest of the cabinet was indifferent to Kahn's plans. The Canadian scholar Larry Pratt wrote about the Kahn plan: "The fantastic environmental chaos would be accepted and the Athabasca River System-part of the Mackenzie System-would be written off...This half-baked brainstorm of a very over-rated think tank is currently being hawked around the country by our Minister of Supply, Jean-Pierre Goyer." Drouin stated in a 1974 interview about her work for the Hudson Institute: "When we studied racial tensions in the United States, we hired several Harlem Globetrotters. Kahn likes to say 'we're really crackpots'-sometimes we're on the government's side and sometimes we're not. If we have to say the Emperor has no clothes, we say it."

=== American politics and death ===
In 1983, Kahn wrote approvingly of Ronald Reagan's political agenda in The Coming Boom: Economic, Political, and Social and bluntly derided Jonathan Schell's claims about the long-term effects of nuclear war. On July 7 that year, he died of a stroke, aged 61.

== Personal life ==
His wife was Rosalie "Jane" Kahn. Together, they would have two children, David and Deborah 'Debbie' Kahn Cunningham.

== Cultural influence ==
Along with John von Neumann, Edward Teller and Wernher von Braun, Kahn was an inspiration for the character "Dr. Strangelove" in the eponymous film by Stanley Kubrick released in 1964. After Kubrick read Kahn's book On Thermonuclear War, he began a correspondence with him which led to face-to-face discussions between Kubrick and Kahn. In the film, Dr. Strangelove refers to a report on the Doomsday Machine by the "BLAND Corporation", a parody of the RAND Corporation. Kahn gave Kubrick the idea for the "Doomsday Machine", a device which would immediately cause the destruction of the entire planet in the event of a nuclear attack. Both the name and the concept of the weapon are drawn from the text of On Thermonuclear War. Louis Menand observes, "In Kahn's book, the Doomsday Machine is an example of the sort of deterrent that appeals to the military mind but that is dangerously destabilizing. Since nations are not suicidal, its only use is to threaten."

Kahn also inspired the character of Professor Groeteschele (Walter Matthau) in the 1964 film Fail Safe.

== Publications ==
Outside physics and statistics, works written by Kahn include:

- 1960. On Thermonuclear War. Princeton University Press. ISBN 0-313-20060-2
- 1962. Thinking about the Unthinkable. Horizon Press.
- 1965. On Escalation: Metaphors and Scenarios. Praeger. ISBN 1-41283004-4
- 1967. The Year 2000: A Framework for Speculation on the Next Thirty-Three Years. MacMillan. ISBN 0-02-560440-6. With Anthony Wiener.
- 1968. Can We Win in Viet Nam? Praeger. Kahn with four other authors: Gastil, Raymond D.; Pfaff, William; Stillman, Edmund; Armbruster, Frank E.
- 1970. The Emerging Japanese Superstate: Challenge and Response. Prentice Hall. ISBN 0-13-274670-0
- 1971. The Japanese Challenge: The Success and Failure of Economic Success. Morrow; Andre Deutsch. ISBN 0-688-08710-8
- 1972. Things to Come: Thinking about the Seventies and Eighties. MacMillan. ISBN 0-02-560470-8. With B. Bruce-Briggs.
- 1973. Herman Kahnsciousness: the Megaton Ideas of the One-Man Think Tank. New American Library. Selected and edited by Jerome Agel.
- 1974. The Future of the Corporation. Mason & Lipscomb. ISBN 0-88405-009-2
- 1976. The Next 200 Years: A Scenario for America and the World. Morrow. ISBN 0-688-08029-4
- 1979. World Economic Development: 1979 and Beyond. William Morrow; Croom Helm. ISBN 0-688-03479-9. With Hollender, Jeffrey, and Hollender, John A.
- 1981. Will She Be Right? The Future of Australia. University of Queensland Press. ISBN 0-7022-1569-4. With Thomas Pepper.
- 1983. The Coming Boom: Economic, Political, and Social. Simon & Schuster; Hutchinson. ISBN 0-671-49265-9
- 1984. Thinking about the Unthinkable in the 1980s. New York: Simon and Schuster. ISBN 0-671-47544-4
- The Nature and Feasibility of War, Deterrence, and Arms Control (Central nuclear war monograph series), (Hudson Institute)
- A Slightly Optimistic World Context for 1975–2000 (Hudson Institute)
- Social Limits to Growth: "Creeping Stagnation" vs. "Natural and Inevitable" (HPS paper)
- A New Kind of Class Struggle in the United States? (Corporate Environment Program. Research memorandum)

Works published by the RAND Corporation involving Kahn:

- The nature and feasibility of war and deterrence, RAND Corporation paper P-1888-RC, 1960
- Some specific suggestions for achieving early non-military defense capabilities and initiating long-range programs, RAND Corporation research memorandum RM-2206-RC, 1958
- (team led by Herman Kahn) Report on a study of Non-Military Defense, RAND Corporation report R-322-RC, 1958
- Herman Kahn and Irwin Mann, War Gaming, RAND Corporation paper P-1167, 1957
- Herman Kahn and Irwin Mann, Ten common pitfalls, RAND research memorandum RM-1937-PR, 1957
- Herman Kahn, Stochastic (Monte Carlo) attenuation analysis, Santa, Monica, Calif., RAND Corp., 1949

== See also ==
- Deterrence theory
- Nuclear triad

== Sources and further reading ==
- Abella, Alex (2009). Soldiers of Reason The RAND Corporation and the Rise of the American Empire. New York: Houghton Mifflin Harcourt. ISBN 9780156035125.
- Barry Bruce-Briggs, Supergenius: The mega-worlds of Herman Kahn, North American Policy Press
- Samuel T. Cohen, Fuck You Mr. President: Confessions of the Father of the Neutron Bomb", 2006
- Daniel Ellsberg, The Doomsday Machine, Confessions of a Nuclear War Planner, Bloomsbury Press, 2017
- Fred Kaplan, The Wizards of Armageddon, Stanford Nuclear Age Series, ISBN 0-8047-1884-9
- Laxer, James (1975). Canada's Energy Crisis. Toronto: James Lorimer Limited. ISBN 9780888620873.
- Ghamari-Tabrizi, Sharon (2009). The Worlds of Herman Kahn: The Intuitive Science of Thermonuclear War. Cambridge: Harvard University Press. ISBN 9780674037564. [reviewed by Christopher Coker in the Times Literary Supplement], nº 5332, June 10, 2005, p. 19.
- Hochstetler, Kathryn; Keck, Margaret (2007). Greening Brazil Environmental Activism in State and Society. Durham: Duke University Press. ISBN 9780822390596.
- Kate Lenkowsky, The Herman Kahn Center of the Hudson Institute, Hudson Institute
- Susan Lindee, Science as Comic Metaphysics, Science 309: 383–384, 2005.
- Herbert I. London, foreword by Herman Kahn, Why Are They Lying to Our Children (Against the doomsayer futurists), ISBN 0-9673514-2-1
- Louis Menand, Fat Man: Herman Kahn and the Nuclear Age, in The New Yorker, June 27, 2005.
- Minter, William (1973). Portuguese Africa and the West. New York: Monthly Review Press. ISBN 9780853452966.
- Pratt, Larry (Summer 1974). "Syncrude or Socialism?". Alternatives: Perspectives on Society, Technology and Environment. 3 (4): 12–16.
- Pratt, Larry; Davis, Robert; Zannis, Mark; Block, Irvin (1974). Robert Chodos, Rae Murphy (ed.). Let Us Prey The Practices and Profits of Canadian Corporations and Businessmen. Toronto: James Lormier. pp. 108–120.
- Claus Pias, "Hermann Kahn – Szenarien für den Kalten Krieg", Zurich: Diaphanes 2009, ISBN 978-3-935300-90-2
- Teixeria, Carlos; Queiroz, Fábio; Cunha, Guilhereme (2023). "Brazil in the Geopolitics of Amazonia". In Ana Flávia Barros-Platiau; Fábio Albergaria de Queiroz; Guilherme Lopes da Cunha (eds.). Brazil in the Geopolitics of Amazonia and Antarctica. Lanham: Lexington Books. pp. 69–92. ISBN 9781666902693.
- Innes Thacker, Ideological Control and the Depoliticisation of Language, in Bold, Christine (ed.), Cencrastus No. 2, Spring 1980, pp. 30–33, ISSN 0264-0856
