= Steven Milloy =

American lobbyist and commentator

Steven J. Milloy is an American lawyer, lobbyist, author, and former Fox News commentator. Milloy is the founder and editor of the anti-science blog JunkScience.com, where he publishes articles that oppose and attack environmental and public health science. His close financial and organizational ties to tobacco and oil companies have been the subject of criticism, as Milloy consistently disputes the scientific consensus on climate change and the health risks of second-hand smoke.

Milloy has been employed at many think tanks. In the 1990s, he worked at The Advancement of Sound Science Center (TASSC), which was established by Philip Morris Companies Inc. to counter legislation against second-hand smoke, eventually becoming its director in 1997. He was an adjunct scholar at the libertarian Cato Institute from the 1990s until the end of 2005 and an adjunct scholar at the Competitive Enterprise Institute from 2005 to 2009. He began contributing to Fox News in 2000. Since 2020, Milloy has served on the board of the Heartland Institute. As of 2023 Milloy is a senior policy fellow with the Energy and Environment Legal Institute.

== Education ==
Milloy holds a B.A. in natural sciences from Johns Hopkins University, a Master of Health Sciences in biostatistics from the Johns Hopkins University School of Hygiene and Public Health, a Juris Doctor from the University of Baltimore, and a Master of Laws from the Georgetown University Law Center.

== Career ==
By 1994, according to his website, Milloy was project leader of the Regulatory Impact Analysis Project, Inc. for the U.S. Department of Energy. The Cato Institute, where he was listed as an adjunct scholar, published his work from 1995 to 2005.

Milloy's employment by the EOP Group Inc. dates back to before 1995, and it includes a record of lobbying on behalf of the Fort Howard Corporation, the International Food Additives Council, Monsanto Co. and Edison Electrics. The Competitive Enterprise Institute also proposed to Philip Morris that Milloy and his partners Michael Gough and Michael Fumento should be used to attack the FDA through reports to the House and Senate on risk Management reform.

In March 1997, Milloy moved from the backroom to become the director of The Advancement of Sound Science Coalition (TASSC), which later became The Advancement of Sound Science Center.

The United States Senate Lobby Filing Disclosure Program lists Milloy as a registered lobbyist for the EOP Group for the years 1998–2000. The guidebook Washington Representatives also listed him as a lobbyist for the EOP Group in 1996.

He has links through Philip Morris and Fox News to Rupert Murdoch and News Corporation. He was a correspondent for Fox News between 2002 and 2009, and he became a policy director at Murray Energy and a member of Donald Trump's first presidential transition team.

== JunkScience Blog ==
Milloy is the founder and editor of the anti-science blog JunkScience.com, where he publishes articles attacking what he calls "junk science" in public policy, which he defines as "faulty scientific data and analysis used to advance special and, often, hidden agendas."

David Michaels has argued the term junk science is used, by Milloy and others, to "denigrate scientists and studies whose findings do not serve the corporate cause".

In an editorial in Chemical & Engineering News, editor-in-chief Rudy Baum called Milloy's junkscience.com website "the best known" example of "a right-wing effort in the U.S. to discredit widely accepted science, technology and medical information." An editorial in the American Journal of Public Health noted that "... attacking the science underlying difficult public policy decisions with the label of 'junk' has become a common ploy for those opposed to regulation ... One need only peruse JunkScience.com to get a sense of the long list of public health issues for which research has been so labeled."

=== Second-hand smoke ===
Milloy has opposed legitimate research linking second-hand tobacco smoke to cancer, falsely claiming that "the vast majority of studies reported no statistical association."

In 1993, Milloy dismissed an Environmental Protection Agency report linking second-hand tobacco smoke to cancer as "a joke." Five years later, Milloy claimed vindication after a federal court contradicted the E.P.A.'s conclusions. However, the court's finding against the EPA was overturned on appeal. When the British Medical Journal published a meta-analysis confirming a link in 1997, Milloy misrepresenting the study wrote, "Of the 37 studies, only 7—less than 19 percent—reported statistically significant increases in lung cancer incidence... Meta-analysis of the secondhand smoke studies was a joke when EPA did it in 1993. And it remains a joke today." When another researcher published a study linking second-hand smoke to cancer, Milloy wrote that she "... must have pictures of journal editors in compromising positions with farm animals. How else can you explain her studies seeing the light of day?"

=== Climate change ===
Milloy claims that human activity has little impact on climate change, denying the scientific consensus on climate change, and that regulations to limit greenhouse gas emissions are unwarranted and harmful to business interests. He offered a prize of $500,000 to anyone who can "prove, in a scientific manner, that humans are causing harmful global warming", stating that "JunkScience.com, in its sole discretion, will determine the winner, if any."

In 2004, when the Arctic Climate Impact Assessment was released by the Arctic Council and the International Arctic Science Committee, Milloy wrote that the report "pretty much debunks itself." Milloy based his assertions that the variation was natural on his interpretation of just one graph from the overview of the large study. One of the lead authors of the study, oceanographer James J. McCarthy, commented that those taking Milloy's position would "have to refute what are hundreds of scientific papers that reconstruct various pieces of this climate puzzle." Milloy's assertion was repeated by lobbyists including the Competitive Enterprise Institute

A Competitive Enterprise Institute press release says Milloy coordinated a climate change denial action at the 2007 Live Earth concert in New York, where activists campaigned among the attendees, and a plane circled the event pulling a banner reading, "DON’T BELIEVE AL GORE — DEMAND DEBATE.COM."

After NOAA published its 2022 update to annual average temperature data, Milloy tweeted 8 years of data and claimed "CO2 warming is a hoax." An Associated Press fact-checking article said the conclusion was false, saying "Social media users are misrepresenting a small portion of a graph from NOAA to support the erroneous claim that global temperatures are falling rather than rising, meaning global warming is not real."

=== DDT ===
In 2006, following a press release by the World Health Organization recommending more extensive use of indoor residual spraying with DDT and other pesticides, Milloy wrote, "It's a relief that the WHO has finally come to its senses." In 2007, the WHO clarified its position, saying it is "very much concerned with health consequences from use of DDT" and reaffirmed its commitment to phasing out the use of DDT.

=== Asbestos and the World Trade Center ===
On September 14, 2001, three days after terrorist attacks destroyed the World Trade Center, Milloy wrote that the World Trade Center towers might have stood longer, preventing many casualties, had the use of asbestos fire-resistant lagging not been discontinued during the Towers' construction.

Advocates for banning asbestos were highly critical of the article, questioning his motives and disputing his conclusions. The International Ban Asbestos Secretariat charged him with "insensitivity that is hard to fathom."

=== Food safety ===
Responding to criticism of the safety of the food product Quorn by the Center for Science in the Public Interest (CSPI), Milloy accused CSPI of having an undisclosed relationship with Quorn's main competitor, Gardenburger. Writing for FoxNews.com, Milloy said that "CSPI appears to have an unsavory relationship with Quorn competitor, Gardenburger" and called the CSPI's complaints "unscrupulous shrieking", noting comments in CSPI newsletters like "Remember the saturated fat and the E. coli bacteria that could be hiding inside [a hamburger]? You can keep the taste but forget the worries with Gardenburger."

=== Rall controversy ===
In 1999, David Platt Rall, a prominent environmental scientist, died in a car accident. Steven Milloy, at the time a Cato adjunct scholar, commented: "Scratch one junk scientist....". Cato Institute President Edward Crane called Milloy's comments an "inexcusable lapse in judgment and civility," but Milloy refused to apologize.

== Industry ties ==
In 2005, it was reported that non-profit organizations operating out of Milloy's home, and in some cases employing no staff, have received large payments from ExxonMobil during his tenure with Fox News. A Fox News spokesperson stated that Milloy is "... affiliated with several not-for-profit groups that possibly may receive funding from Exxon, but he certainly does not receive funding directly from Exxon."

=== Links to the tobacco industry ===
While at FoxNews.com, Milloy continued to attack the scientific consensus that second-hand tobacco smoke causes cancer. However, with the release of confidential tobacco industry documents as part of the Tobacco Master Settlement Agreement, the objectivity of Milloy's stance on second-hand smoke has been questioned. Based on this documentation, journalists Paul D. Thacker and George Monbiot, as well as the Union of Concerned Scientists and others, have contended that Milloy is a paid advocate for the tobacco industry.

Milloy's junkscience.com website was reviewed and revised by a public relations firm hired by the R. J. Reynolds Tobacco Company. A 1994 Philip Morris memo listed TASSC among its "Tools to Affect Legislative Decisions". According to its 1997 annual report, TASSC "sponsored" junkscience.com.

The New Republic reported that Milloy, who is presented by Fox News as an independent journalist, was under contract to provide consulting services to Philip Morris through the end of 2005. In 2000 and 2001, for example, Milloy received a total of $180,000 in payments from Philip Morris for consulting services. A spokesperson for Fox News stated, "Fox News was unaware of Milloy's connection with Philip Morris. Any affiliation he had should have been disclosed."

=== Corporate activism ===
Milloy and former tobacco executive Tom Borelli ran a mutual fund called the Free Enterprise Action Fund (FEAF). The fund criticized companies that voluntarily adopt higher environmental standards. Through the platform of the FEAF, Milloy has criticized many other corporations for adopting environmental initiatives:

- The FEAF criticized Microsoft for abandoning the use of PVC in its packing materials.
- Milloy accused the Business Roundtable, a pro-business organization of CEOs, of being "silent about current threats to business", adding, "Last September, we warned 18 member company CEOs participating in the BRT’s 'sustainable growth' initiative to stop wasting corporate resources."
- Milloy and Borelli argued that General Electric is harming its shareholders by launching a program to curtail greenhouse gas emissions. They also accused G.E. of ignoring the input of global warming denialist groups such as the Cato Institute and the Competitive Enterprise Institute in forming their environmental policy.

FEAF was criticized by investment analyst Chuck Jaffe as being "an advocacy group in search of assets." Jaffe concludes, "Strip away the rhetoric, and you're getting a very expensive, underperforming index fund, while Milloy and his partner Thomas Borelli get a platform for raising their pet issues."

Similarly, Daniel Gross, in a Slate magazine article, wrote that FEAF "seems to be a lobbying enterprise masquerading as a mutual fund." He noted that Milloy and Tom Borelli, the former head of corporate scientific affairs for Philip Morris, lack any money management experience, also noting FEAF had badly underperformed the S&P 500 during its first 10 months of existence. Gross concluded that, "... in the short term, it looks like Borelli and Milloy are essentially paying the fund for the privilege of using it as a platform to broadcast their views on corporate governance, global warming, and a host of other issues."

== Books ==
- Milloy, Steven J. (2016). Scare Pollution: Why and How to Fix the EPA. Bench Press. ISBN 978-0998259710.
- Green Hell: How Environmentalists Plan to Control Your Life and What You Can Do to Stop Them, Regnery Publishing, 2009, ISBN 978-1-59698-585-8
- Junk Science Judo: Self-defense Against Health Scares and Scams, Cato Institute, 2001, ISBN 1-930865-12-0
- Silencing Science, Cato Institute, 1999, ISBN 1-882577-72-8 (with Michael Gough)
- Science Without Sense: The Risky Business of Public Health Research, Cato Institute, 1996, ISBN 1-882577-34-5
- Gough, Michael; Milloy, Steven J. (1996). EPA's cancer risk guidelines : guidance to nowhere. Cato Institute. OCLC 36235006.
- Science-Based Risk Assessment: A Piece of the Superfund Puzzle, National Environmental Policy Institute, 1995, ISBN 0-9647463-0-1

== See also ==
- Global Climate Coalition
- American Petroleum Institute
- Heartland Institute
- Thank You for Smoking
