= Pierre Wack =

French oil executive (1922–1997)

Pierre Wack (1922–1997) was a French oil executive who was the first to develop the use of scenario planning in the private sector, at Royal Dutch Shell’s London headquarters in the 1970s. So successful was he that the Anglo-Dutch oil giant was able to anticipate not just one Arab-induced oil shock during that decade, but two. His 1985 articles "Scenarios: Uncharted Waters Ahead" and "Scenarios: Shooting the Rapids" are considered among the first to bring the thoughts and theories of futurist Herman Kahn into business strategy. Thanks to his work for de Beers Co in South of Africa, he met Nelson Mandela and participated in the end of apartheid.

A biography was written in 2017 about Pierre Wack by Thomas J. Chermack that details his life history as well as the evolution of scenario planning during his time at Shell and beyond. The book also details his work with de Beers and Anglo American Corporation in South Africa as well as his work on scenarios that tackled the end of apartheid.
