= APCO (company) =

American public relations firm

- Type: Private
- Industry: Public relations
- Founded: 1984; 42 years ago
- Founder: Margery Kraus
- Headquarters: Washington, D.C., U.S.
- Key people: Margery Kraus (Executive Chairman); Brad Staples (CEO)
- Revenue: $257 million (2024)
- Number of employees: ~1200 (2024)
- Website: www.apcoworldwide.com

APCO is an American public affairs and strategic communications consulting firm headquartered in Washington, D.C. It was founded in 1984 by Margery Kraus, who is now the firm's Executive Chairman. As of 2024, the firm operates in 35 locations with approximately 1,200 employees. It is among the largest independently owned PR firms in the United States.

The firm's work includes political consulting and crisis communications. Its staff includes former government officials and diplomats. Clients have included multinational corporations, governmental agencies, and nonprofit organizations.

== History ==
Margery Kraus founded APCO Associates in 1984 as a subsidiary to Arnold & Porter, one of Washington's largest law firms, and from where APCO's name is derived. Grey Global Group, a New York–based global advertising and marketing agency, purchased majority ownership of APCO in 1991 from Arnold & Porter. On September 28, 2004, APCO announced its independent buyout from Grey Global and has thus become one of the largest privately owned public relations firms in the world.

In 2016, Kraus stepped down from her role as CEO, for the role to be filled by Brad Staples, who is a member of the London office. When speaking to PR Week, Staples announced a company-wide effort to centralize global account leadership, shifting some manage roles to Europe, rather than the United States.

In February 2020, APCO Worldwide announced an agreement to a partnership with Erie Street, a Chicago-based advisory firm. APCO declined to disclose financial terms but has confirmed that the partnership will not affect ownership or staffing at either firm.

In 2023, APCO Worldwide acquired Gagen MacDonald, a Chicago-based employee engagement firm Camarco, a London-based financial communications consultancy, and NGC International Advisory, a Dubai based public policy and government affairs consultancy led by Mohamed Bahaa.

== Notable clients ==
=== Merck ===
APCO handled the crisis for Merck & Co's withdrawal of Vioxx from the market. Kazakhstan's president, Nursultan Nazarbayev hired APCO to extricate himself from a four-year-long dispute with his former son-in-law Rakhat Aliyev.

=== Worldcom ===
WorldCom hired APCO Worldwide to handle its political PR surrounding the media frenzy regarding its disclosure that £2.4bn in expenses had been falsely reported in its financial results in 2002.

=== Gujarat ===
APCO also promoted and rebranded the Gujarat Global Investors' Summit in India, the showpiece investment meeting of the then chief minister and current prime minister, Narendra Modi as "Vibrant Gujarat".

=== U.S. State Department ===
APCO Worldwide was the lead management agency for the American Pavilion at the Astana Expo 2017.

=== Advancement of Sound Science Coalition ===
The "Sound Science Coalition" (TASSC) was created in 1993 by Phillip Morris and APCO in response to a 1992 United States Environmental Protection Agency (EPA) report which identified secondhand smoke as a Group A human carcinogen. TASSC developed local coalitions to influence media, legislators, and the public, and recruited scientists and researchers to support Philip Morris's position. Nonetheless, TASSC described itself as "a not-for-profit coalition advocating the use of sound science in public policy decision making." TASSC's links to the tobacco industry were minimized as part of APCO's strategy for TASSC to appear to be an independent national grassroots coalition. To conceal this relationship, TASSC broadened their focus to question other scientific topics, notable among them global warming.

=== Malaysia ===
On March 30, 2010, Malaysian opposition leader Anwar Ibrahim alleged in the Malaysian parliament (the Dewan Rakyat) that the 1Malaysia concept was mirrored after "One Israel" concept and designed by Mindteams Sdn Bhd, a branch in Malaysia of APCO Worldwide. He alleged that APCO also created the One Israel concept in 1999 for then Israeli's Prime Minister Ehud Barak. Both APCO and the Barisan Nasional government stated that Anwar's allegation was untrue. Malaysian lawmakers have tabled a motion to censure Anwar for misleading the Parliament over his 1Malaysia-One Israel allegations which were passed by the Parliament on April 22, 2010.

=== Hewlett-Packard ===
In 2010, APCO was involved in the recommendation to fire Mark Hurd, the CEO of Hewlett-Packard (HP). Kent Jarrell, a senior vice president, wrote a mock news story which he showed to HP's board. During this same meeting, he contemplated that HP would negatively be affected by bad press of its CEO being involved in an inappropriate relationship with an ex-soft porn actress, Jodie Fisher.

=== Elbit Systems ===
In September 2024, the London headquarters of APCO was targeted by Palestine Action over its representation of the UK interests of Israeli arms firm Elbit Systems. Activists from the group daubed the façade of the office building with red paint using repurposed fire extinguishers, blocked the entrance and locked the doors with a bike lock.

=== Labour Party ===
In February 2026 it was reported that PR firm APCO had investigated the private affairs of several journalists when commissioned by the Blairite lobbying group Labour Together to ascertain the source of reports about Labour Together's late declaration of certain donations. The Sunday Times reported that the APCO report, named "Operation Cannon", was written by a former Sunday Times employee and was shown to Labour shadow cabinet members, falsely suggesting that two Sunday Times journalists were part of a Russian campaign to politically harm Starmer. Labour Together sent a shorter version of the APCO report to GCHQ's National Cyber Security Centre (NCSC), which declined to investigate.

Prime Minister Keir Starmer subsequently asked the Independent Advisor on Ministerial Standards to investigate whether Simons' conduct had breached the Ministerial Code. Labour Together's director Josh Simons claimed that by including this information in its report APCO had gone beyond what had been asked of them and welcomed the launch of an investigation into APCO's conduct by the Public Relations and Communications Association. The Guardian newspaper on 20 February 2026 reported that it had seen the emails to NCSC and disclosed some of their contents, and that there were calls for Simons to resign or be sacked. In March 2026, Simons said he had been "naïve" in his commissioning of the report because he "was 30 years old".

It was later reported that Tom Harper, a senior APCO executive, told a freelance contractor who had been hired on the project to destroy evidence of its actions.
