= Sarah May Stern =

American journalist

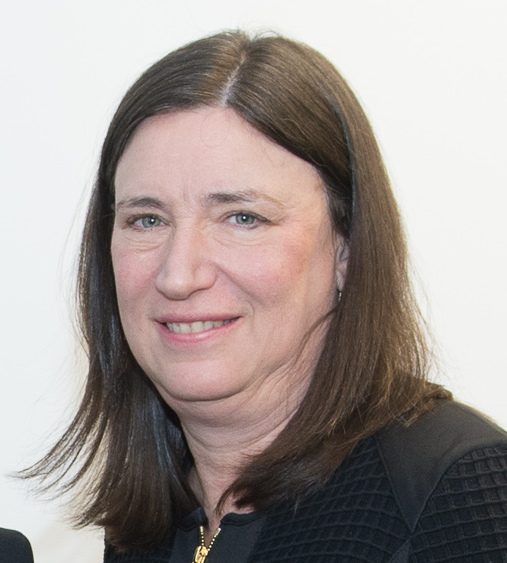
- Education: Yale University (B.A., 1981); Harvard Business School (1985)
- Occupation: Chair of the board of the Hudson Institute
- Website: hudson.org

Sarah May Stern is a journalism executive and chair of the board of the Hudson Institute, an American conservative think tank.

== Education ==
Stern graduated from Yale University with a Bachelor of Arts in history in 1981. She also graduated from Harvard Business School in 1985.

== Career ==
Stern began her career at Newsweek. She eventually joined Commentary where she worked until 2010, eventually becoming business director. In 2006, she became the chairman of the board of trustees at Hudson Institute following her father's retirement.

She is a former president of the Edgemont Union Free School District.

In addition to Hudson Institute, Stern is also a trustee for a number of organizations including The Washington Institute for Near East Policy, Winning for Women, and Main Idea, a residential summer camp for economically disadvantaged girls in Maine.

She was among the leaders sanctioned by the Chinese government following the Ronald Reagan Presidential Library's decision to host a meeting with Taiwanese President Tsai Ing-wen and Speaker of the House Kevin McCarthy.

== Personal life ==
In 1986, Stern married Mark Rosenblatt at The Temple in Nashville, Tennessee. Her father Walter P. Stern was a Wall Street executive who preceded her as the chair of the board at Hudson Institute.
