= Free Enterprise Action Fund =

The Free Enterprise Action Fund was a mutual fund operated by Steven Milloy and Tom Borelli, with the goal of counterbalancing the activities of self-described ethical investment funds. Whereas "ethical investment" funds avoid investments in firms that are accused of damaging the environment or of other negatively regarded behaviors, the Free Enterprise Action Fund sought out such investments, based on Milloy's claim that such criticisms are typically based on political bias or junk science. The fund ceased operations in 2009 and was merged into the Congressional Effect Fund.

== Controversy ==
The Free Enterprise Action Fund was criticized for taking ideological stances at the expense of its investors' interests. Daniel Gross, in Slate, wrote:

FEAF's managers also don't appear to be very interested in making money. Assembling a portfolio of 392 teeny positions (111 shares of Federal Express, 60 shares of Tiffany, etc.) is an incredibly inefficient and costly way of trying to mimic the S&P 500. Asset managers get paid based on the assets they manage. At FEAF, the Adviser (Milloy plus Borelli) receives a fee equal to 1.25 percent of assets. Five million dollars in assets throws off about $62,000 in fees annually, which is nowhere near enough to pay the salary of a professional money manager.

Page 17 of the annual report shows that the fund incurred total expenses of $302,117, a whopping 6 percent of assets. But the prospectus promises that fees won't eat up more than 2 percent of total assets each year. And so in 2005, the adviser (i.e., Borelli and Milloy) waived his entire $44,727 management fee. What's more, the adviser reimbursed some $185,616 in trading, administrative, and legal expenses to the fund. If the fund's assets rise sharply in the next few years, the adviser can theoretically recoup these waived payments and reimbursements. But in the short term, it looks like Borelli and Milloy are essentially paying the fund for the privilege of using it as a platform to broadcast their views on corporate governance, global warming, and a host of other issues.

On the other hand, Steve Forbes praised the fund:

Early last year promarket activists launched the Free Enterprise Action Fund. It has only a handful of dollars today and is investing primarily in companies that make up the S&P 500. The fund is run by 47-year-old entrepreneur Steve Milloy, who hopes that it and other funds like it will become counterweights to these anti-business activists by waging proxy campaigns for pro entrepreneurial capitalist measures (including the flat tax). Who knows how well the fund will do? But its precept is a sound one: Good business is good social policy.

== Activism through the Fund ==
In a conference in New York in March 2008, Milloy stated that the Fund aims to "be a problem for managements and shareholders", and that he and Borelli "primarily work through shareholder proposals" to "get the shareholders and CEOs to think about what they're doing". He also stated, "We have filed numerous shareholder proposals with companies in the US Climate Action Partnership".

== Financial results ==
The 2008 Annual Report for the fund shows an annualized loss of 6.58% during the timeframe of March 1, 2005 (its inception) to December 31, 2008. For comparison, the S&P 500 Index showed an annualized loss of 5.47% during this period.

At the end of 2008, the fund had total net assets under management of $6,705,261. The total paid-in-capital invested with the fund, from its start to the end of 2008, was $9,983,108 (p. 14).

As had occurred in every year of operation thus far (p. 17), the adviser of the fund waived or reimbursed expenses to the fund. (Currently, the adviser is contractually obligated to do so to maintain the ratio of expenses to average net assets as, at most, 1.75%.) In 2008, the amount waived or reimbursed was $181,612; in previous years, it had been $154,750 (in 2007), $239,564 (in 2006), and $230,343 (in 2005). Of the $181,612 in 2008, $129,468 was from waiving the investment advisory fee, leaving $52,144 as the amount reimbursed out-of-pocket to the fund by the adviser for other operating expenses.
