= On Thermonuclear War =

1960 book by Herman Kahn

- First edition
- Author: Herman Kahn
- Language: English
- Subject: Political science International security Military policy Nuclear warfare Nuclear strategy
- Publisher: Princeton University Press (1960); Transaction Publishers (2007)
- Publication place: United States
- Pages: 668
- ISBN: 9781412815598
- OCLC: 8546432
- Dewey Decimal: 358.39
- LC Class: UF767 .K25 1961
- Followed by: On Escalation: Metaphors and Scenarios

On Thermonuclear War is a 1960 book by Herman Kahn, a military strategist at the RAND Corporation. It was written one year before he left RAND to form the Hudson Institute. It is a controversial treatise on the nature and theory of war in the thermonuclear weapon age. In it, Kahn addresses the strategic doctrines of nuclear war and its effect on the international balance of power.

Kahn's stated purpose in writing the book was "avoiding disaster and buying time, without specifying the use of this time." The title of the book was inspired by the classic volume On War, by Carl von Clausewitz.

Widely read on both sides of the Iron Curtain—the book sold 30,000 copies in hardcover—it is noteworthy for its views on the lack of credibility of a purely thermonuclear deterrent and how a country could "win" a nuclear war.

Kahn used the term Doomsday Machine in the book as a rhetorical device to show the limits of John von Neumann's strategy of mutual assured destruction or MAD.

== Reception ==
Of the book, Hubert H. Humphrey said: "New thoughts, particularly those which contradict current assumptions, are always painful for the human mind to contemplate. On Thermonuclear War is filled with such thoughts."

== In popular culture ==
Kahn is sometimes credited with having coined the term megadeath in this book as shorthand for one million deaths. However, though the book does describe deaths in terms of millions, it does not contain the term megadeath, and Kahn was quoted as having said in a 1982 interview, "I know of no analyst who uses the term megadeath. The peace people use it and they think we use it." The book The Worlds of Herman Kahn contains a footnote describing the use of the term in the headline of a 1963 article by Marcus Raskin.

Lines from the character General Buck Turgidson in Stanley Kubrick's 1964 film Dr. Strangelove directly mimic passages from this book, such as Turgidson's phrase "two admittedly regrettable, but nevertheless, distinguishable post-war environments" which reflects a chart from this book labeled "Tragic but Distinguishable Postwar States". Indeed, the folder that General Turgidson holds while reading a report on projected nuclear war casualties is titled "Global Targets in Megadeaths".

Tom Clancy's 1991 political thriller The Sum of All Fears quotes a passage from this book in the introduction.

== Publication ==
First published in 1960 by the Princeton University Press (ISBN 0-313-20060-2), it was republished as a paperback by Transaction Publishers in 2007 (ISBN 978-1412806640).

== Sources ==
- Kahn, H. (2011). On Thermonuclear War. War and Peace Research. Transaction Publishers. ISBN 978-1-4128-1559-8.
