= Michael Scott Doran =

American academic and policy expert (born 1962)

- Born: April 25, 1962 (age 63)

Academic background
- Education: Stanford University (BA); Princeton University (PhD)
- Thesis: The Politics of Pan-Arabism: Egyptian Foreign Policy, 1945-1948 (1997)

Academic work
- Notable works: Ike's Gamble: America's Rise to Dominance in the Middle East (2016)

Michael Scott Doran (born April 25, 1962) is an American analyst, commentator, and scholar specializing in international politics and the Middle East. He is a senior fellow at the Hudson Institute, where his research and commentary have shaped discussions of American foreign policy. Previously, he was a senior fellow at the Saban Center for Middle East Policy at the Brookings Institution. Doran has also served as a visiting professor at the Robert F. Wagner Graduate School of Public Service at New York University, and as an assistant professor in Near Eastern Studies at Princeton University, following earlier teaching at the University of Central Florida. He served in government as a senior director at the National Security Council and as deputy assistant secretary for public diplomacy at the U.S. Department of Defense during the George W. Bush administration. Doran publicly supported the invasion of Iraq and advocated a passel of “regime change” policies targeting Middle East countries.

== Education ==
Doran earned his PhD in Near Eastern studies from Princeton University in 1997, where his advisor was L. Carl Brown. He previously attended Stanford University, graduating with a BA in history in 1984.

== Academic and Public Service Career ==
Doran is currently a senior fellow at the Hudson Institute, which he joined in 2014. Before that, he was a senior fellow at the Saban Center for Middle East Policy at the Brookings Institution. He has held academic appointments as a visiting professor at New York University's Robert F. Wagner Graduate School of Public Service, and as an assistant professor in Princeton’s Near Eastern Studies Department, after teaching at the University of Central Florida. In public service, Doran served as deputy assistant secretary for public diplomacy at the U.S. Department of Defense in 2007, following his role as senior director for Near East and North African affairs at the National Security Council from 2005 to 2007. His career reflects a blend of academic research, policy engagement, and government service.

== Views and Reception ==
Doran’s writings and public statements on U.S. policy and the Middle East have received considerable attention, both supportive and critical. He has advocated for active U.S. engagement in the region, including supporting the invasion of Iraq, and is recognized for his influential commentary.

=== Middle East ===
Doran advocated for increased US military intervention in the Middle East. “I would say that the Middle East is like having diabetes.You can't—you can't get rid of it. You have to—you have to manage it. And so my argument is that—that a bias toward action and a bias toward military action is the best way to treat the disease.” He advocated for the US military to intervene in Syria during the civil war to overthrow the Syrian government.

A fierce critic of the Obama administration's efforts to negotiate with Iran over its nuclear program, Doran strongly denounced the nuclear agreement reached with Iran in July 2015. He argued that the United States should revoke the agreement and toughen its anti-Iran policy. Doran also expressed his support for Israeli Prime Minister Benjamin Netanyahu's speech to Congress challenging President Obama's Iran strategy.

=== Azerbaijan-related Advocacy ===
Doran has been characterized by some critics in The American Conservative as "one of the leading hawkish cheerleaders for Azerbaijan" and for encouraging anti-Armenian sentiment. Iranian-American journalist Sohrab Ahmari has accused Doran of downplaying Azerbaijani actions, and Michael Rubin of the American Enterprise Institute has criticized his public commentary. Casey Michel, head of the Combating Kleptocracy Program at the Human Rights Foundation, has disputed Doran's positive characterization of Azerbaijan under Ilham Aliyev, comparing it unfavorably to historic authoritarian regimes.

== Books ==
- Doran, Michael (1999). Pan-Arabism before Nasser: Egyptian Power Politics and the Palestine Question. Oxford University Press. ISBN 9780195352528.
- Doran, Michael (2016). Ike's Gamble: America’s Rise to Dominance in the Middle East. Simon and Schuster. ISBN 9781451697759.
- Doran, Michael (2015). "What Carter Owes Begin". Begin's Zionist Legacy. Mosaic Books. ISBN 9781592644155.
