= Kenneth R. Weinstein =

American government official and writer (born 1961)

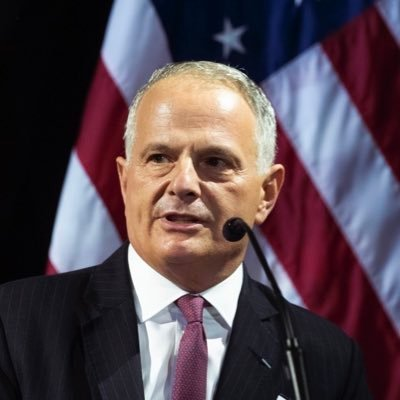
Kenneth R. Weinstein

Kenneth R. Weinstein (born November 4, 1961) is Japan Chair at Hudson Institute, a conservative Washington-based think tank. Weinstein is also CEO, as well as co-founder with the late Japanese Prime Minister, Shinzo Abe, of the Indo-Pacific Forum, an international, not-for-profit organization dedicated to furthering Abe's vision of a Free and Open Indo-Pacific to collaborate on strategy, construct partnerships, and shape inclusive, sustainable policies and concrete initiatives for the security resilience, and prosperity of the Indo-Pacific region.

Weinstein led Hudson Institute as CEO from 2005 to 2021 and was both President and CEO during the last ten years as CEO. From 2019-2023, he was also the Walter P. Stern Distinguished Fellow. Weinstein is an expert on U.S. foreign policy and international affairs and regularly briefs world leaders on current developments. He has commented extensively on national and international affairs on television and in numerous publications, including The Wall Street Journal, theYomiuri Shimbun, and Le Monde.

In September 2025, he was named the ombudsman for CBS News.

== Career ==
Weinstein began his career as a researcher at Hudson Institute, before taking positions at the New Citizenship Project, the Shalem Center and the Heritage Foundation. He rejoined Hudson in 1999, serving as director of Hudson's Washington office and its COO before taking over as CEO in 2005. Under Weinstein's leadership, Hudson Institute grew significantly in size and impact, building ties to elected and appointed officials on both sides of the aisle in the US and around the world, becoming one of Washington's most influential think tanks. During his tenure as President and CEO, Hudson nearly tripled its annual budget to $20 million and quintupled its endowment to $60 million. Among the many noted experts Weinstein recruited to Hudson are Walter Russell Mead, Michael Pillsbury, H. R. McMaster, Elaine Chao, Nadia Schadlow, Patrick Cronin and Christopher DeMuth.

In addition to his work at Hudson Institute, Weinstein was nominated by President George W. Bush and confirmed by the US Senate in 2006 to serve on the National Council for the Humanities, the board which oversees the National Endowment for the Humanities. In 2013, he was nominated by President Obama to serve on the Broadcasting Board of Governors (now the U.S. Agency for Global Media), the agency which oversees Voice of America, Radio Free Europe/Radio Liberty, Radio Free Asia, and other government broadcasting programs. Weinstein was later elected by his fellow governors as chairman of the BBG in 2017, a position in which he served until 2020. In September 2018, he was appointed to the Advisory Committee for Trade Policy and Negotiations by President Donald Trump.

== Nomination as U.S. Ambassador to Japan ==
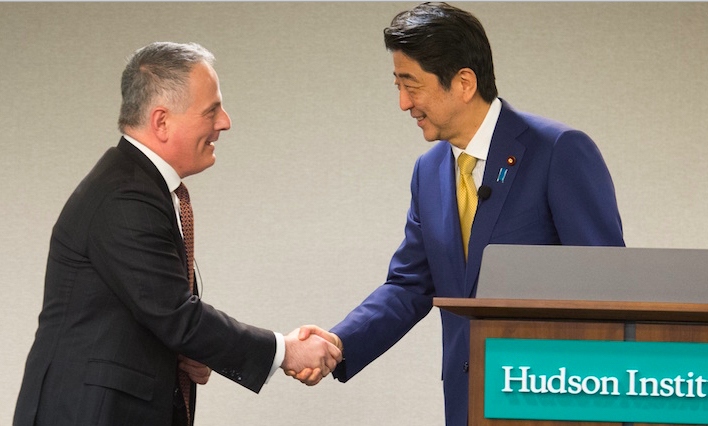
Japanese Prime Minister Shinzo Abe introduced by Weinstein at grand opening of Hudson Institute's Betsy and Walter Stern Policy Center, Washington, DC, April 2016

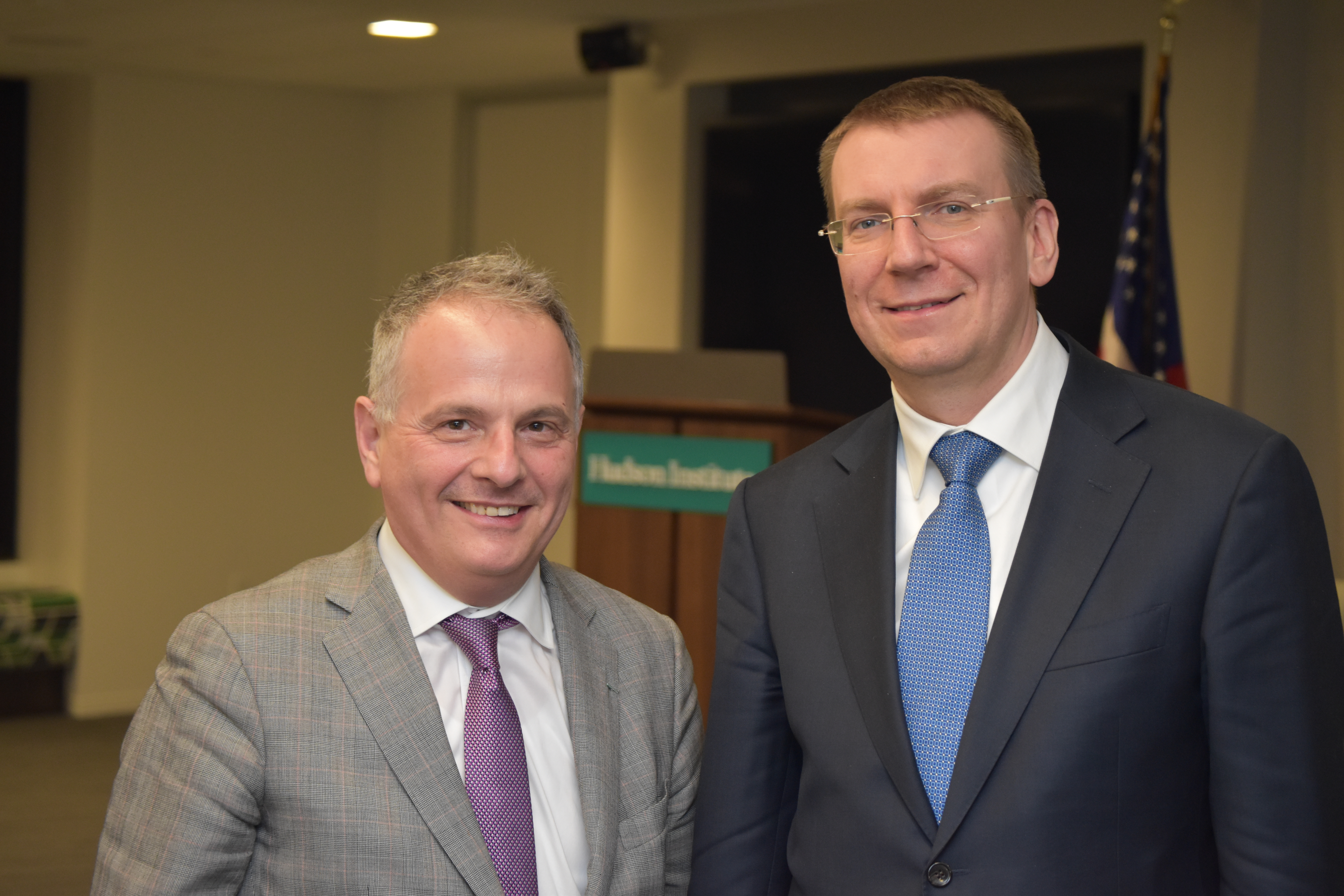
Weinstein with Edgars Rinkēvičs

On March 13, 2020, President Donald Trump announced his intent to nominate Weinstein as the next U.S. Ambassador to Japan. Given Weinstein's policy expertise, his nomination received strong bipartisan support, including from the U.S. Chamber of Commerce, former Vice Presidents Walter Mondale and Dan Quayle, former Directors of National Intelligence Dan Coats and Dennis Blair, and former UN ambassador Nikki Haley, as well as noted Asia policy experts Kurt Campbell, Michael Green, and Joseph Nye. Weinstein was introduced at his Senate Foreign Relations Committee nomination hearing by former Senator Joseph Lieberman, who noted Weinstein "has developed not only a great knowledge of [the] U.S.–Japanese relationship, but very deep friendships and trusting relationships within Japan, both in the government and in the business community." Weinstein's testimony focused on the strategic convergence between the U.S. and Japan in the Abe-Trump era, and on the need for increased defense and technological cooperation to meet the challenge posed by the People's Republic of China.

Weinstein received unanimous support from the Senate Foreign Relations Committee, which voted him out of committee on September 22, 2020. Following the committee vote, Weinstein was praised by Japanese Chief Cabinet Secretary Katsunobu Kato for having "built personal connections with a wide range of Japanese stakeholders, both public and private," noting, "I expect his official appointment will greatly contribute to the even further development of U.S.–Japan relations." Due to debate in the Senate over Ruth Bader Ginsburg's replacement on the Supreme Court, and the November 2020 election, no non-career nominee for a U.S. ambassadorship was able to be confirmed in the fall of 2020. Weinstein's nomination lapsed at the end of the 116th Congress.

== Personal life ==
Weinstein is a political theorist who received his Bachelor of Arts in General Studies in the Humanities from the University of Chicago, his Master of Philosophy in Soviet and Eastern European studies from the Institut d'Etudes Politiques de Paris and his Doctor of Philosophy in Government from Harvard University. He grew up in Rego Park, Queens and attended Stuyvesant High School. He has taught at Claremont McKenna College and Georgetown University.

Weinstein speaks fluent French and German and has done live, prime time television programs in France and Germany. He was decorated with a knighthood in Arts and Letters by the French Ministry of Culture and Communication as a Chevalier dans l'Ordre des Arts et des Lettres and received the Japanese Foreign Minister’s Commendation for “extraordinary contributions to Japanese-US relations.”

Married to Amy Kauffman since 1996, Weinstein is a father and grandfather who lives in Washington, D.C. He is a member of Kesher Israel Synagogue.

== Selected publications ==
- Weinstein, Kenneth R. (December 18, 2024). "Weinstein, Kenneth R. Interviewed by Stefanie Bolzen (December 17, 2024), "Das Wichtigste ist die Metastase Iran Auszuloeschen"". Die Welt.
- Weinstein, Kenneth R. (March 5, 2024). "The Growing Limits To Formulating US Grand Strategy In An Ever More Complex World". Hoover Institution.
- Weinstein, Kenneth R. (March 16, 2022). "Wally Stern: The Legacy of Herman Kahn's Intellectual Other Half". Hudson Institute.
- Weinstein, Kenneth; Sibley, Nate (June 13, 2019). "America Must Combat Illicit Finance". The Hill.
- Weinstein, Kenneth R. (November 5, 2017). "Trump Brings a New Seriousness With Him to Asia". The Wall Street Journal.
- Weinstein, Kenneth R. (July 13, 2017). "The terror-fighting burden on Emmanuel Macron: What President Trump should ask from the French president". New York Daily News.
- Weinstein, Kenneth R.; Herman, Arthur (February 8, 2017). "Will Japan Be the U.S.'s New 'Special Relationship'?". National Review.
- Weinstein, Kenneth R. (November 17, 2015). Options for Reforming U.S. Overseas Broadcasting (Congressional testimony).
- Weinstein, Kenneth R. (April 29, 2015). Subcommittee Hearing: The Global Magnitsky Human Rights Accountability Act (Congressional testimony).
- Weinstein, Kenneth R. (February 24, 2015). "A French Lesson for American Liberals". The Wall Street Journal.
- Weinstein, Kenneth R. (May 2014). "Hollande The Hawk? An Unlikely Ally Emerges". World Affairs. 177 (1): 87–96. JSTOR 43555067.
- Weinstein, Kenneth R. (February 11, 2014). Ken Weinstein discusses President Hollande's visit to U.S. on BFMTV (TV interview) (in French).
- Weinstein, Kenneth; Yoshihara, Kin-ichi (October 25, 2013). "Why America Needs Japan More than Ever". RealClearWorld.
- Weinstein, Kenneth R. (April 1, 2013). "Venus and Mars Revisited". The Wall Street Journal.
- Weinstein, Kenneth R. (September 11, 2012). "Return to Fulda". Jewish Ideas Daily. Archived from the original on October 21, 2020.
- Weinstein, Kenneth R. (October 13, 2010). "Sarkozy's Russian Gamble". The Wall Street Journal.
- Kahn, Herman (2009). Weinstein, Kenneth R.; Aligica, Paul Dragos (eds.). The Essential Herman Kahn: In Defense of Thinking. Lanham: Lexington Books. ISBN 978-0739128299.
- Weinstein, Kenneth R. (July 10, 2006). Opening Remarks on US-Japan-India Trilateral Relations. AFJ-Hudson Institute Conference.
- Weinstein, Kenneth R.; London, Herbert I., eds. (2003). A Roadmap for Japan's Future. Tokyo: Tokuma Shoten. ISBN 978-4198617516.
- Weinstein, Kenneth R. (May 8, 2000). "The Real Allan Bloom". The Weekly Standard. 5 (32).
- Weinstein, Kenneth R. (2000). "'Hobbes,' 'Spinoza,' and 'Faustus Socinus' in Pierre Bayle's Historical and Critical Dictionary". In Blitz, Mark; Kristol, William (eds.). Educating the prince: Essays in Honor of Harvey Mansfield. Lanham: Rowman & Littlefield. pp. 91–99. ISBN 978-0742508279.
- Weinstein, Kenneth Roy (1992). Atheism and Enlightenment in the Political Philosophy of Pierre Bayle (Ph.D. thesis). Harvard University.
