= Advancement of Sound Science Center =

Tobacco-industry-funded lobby group

The Advancement of Sound Science Center (TASSC), formerly The Advancement of Sound Science Coalition, was an industry-funded lobby group and crisis management vehicle, and was created in 1993 by Phillip Morris and APCO in response to a 1992 United States Environmental Protection Agency (EPA) report which identified secondhand smoke as a "confirmed" human carcinogen. TASSC's stated objectives were to (1) discredit the EPA report; (2) fight anti-smoking legislation; and (3) pro-actively pass legislation favourable to the tobacco industry.

Philip Morris hired APCO Worldwide, a communications consultancy with expertise in crisis management, handling sensitive political issues, lobbying, media relations, coalition building, opinion research, market entry, corporate social responsibility, and online communication. (Note: Many APCO executives were previously prominent government officials. APCO’s clientele consists of multi-national corporations, governments, associations and nonprofit organizations.) APCO's designed strategies for TASSC aimed at establishing TASSC as "a credible source for reporters when questioning the validity of scientific studies" and to "Encourage the public to question – from the grassroots up – the validity of scientific studies".

== Goals and strategies ==
The PR firm known as APCO began life as a real-estate investment subsidiary for the legal partners in the law-firm Arnold & Porters. It was originally identified as A&P Co, which was converted into a specialist PR front to service Philip Morris, the major client of Arnold & Porters who serviced the cigarette company at the boardroom level. A&P then hired Margery Kraus to run the new company, and it expanded rapidly through its tobacco-funded activities, successively becoming APCo, APCO, then APCO & Associates, and finally APCO Worldwide.

=== Philip Morris and APCO ===
Tobacco document archives include a section on Philip Morris which is entitled:

Goals and objectives:

The overall goals of the media plan are to:

1. raise the awareness level of the use of unsound science in public policy decision making among target audiences;
2. educate publics on the impact of this issue; and
3. lay the groundwork and provide an environment for a successful grassroots mobilization effort to assist (the Tobacco Company) Philip Morris with its issues nationally and in target states.

The objectives of the media plan are to:

- Establish TASSC as a credible source for reporters when questioning the validity of scientific studies. Encourage the public to question-from the grassroots up-the validity of scientific studies.
- Mobilize support for TASSC through alliances with other organizations and third-party allies.
- Develop materials, including news article reprints, that can be "merchandized" [sic] to TASSC audiences. Increase membership in and funding of TASSC. Publicize and refine TASSC messages on an ongoing basis."

TASSC's original goal was to become a "publicly known, respected and highly visible organization" within months of its creation by using an "integrated program that combines a strategic, comprehensive media relations program.

The strategies developed by APCO Worldwide (specifically for Philip Morris) and applied through The Advancement of Sound Science Center were highly effective and continue to be successfully used today by many organisations seeking to counter published peer-reviewed mainstream scientific research which might be used in formulating public policies. APCO Worldwide focused on unsettling the general public's confidence in the validity of mainstream scientific research in a series of well-planned public education campaigns. They strategically targeted mainstream media with junk-science claims about scientific reports (for example, claims about health and environmental risks that required regulatory policies).

=== Astroturfing ===
This methodology is now called astroturfing -- generally uses so-called "think-tanks", and it works through coordinated local activism, "information sharing" and the strategic creation by APCO and its associates of seeded grassroots organizations. Under APCO's advice, TASSC developed local coalitions, making them appear to be indigenous grass roots organizations, and used them to influence media, legislators, and the public, and in some cases, to recruit scientists and researchers to support Philip Morris's pro-smoking position. TASSC promoted itself as "a not-for-profit coalition advocating the use of sound science in public policy decision making."

TASSC's links to the tobacco industry remained hidden for decades: APCO's strategy was for TASSC to appear to be an independent national grassroots coalition. To conceal this relationship, TASSC broadened the focus to question the validity of other scientific concerns, notably global warming.

=== Coopting the media ===
Op-eds and other merchandised articles which targeted the lay reader (although written by academics), were circulated to the media in a ready-to-scan/print form by the pro-tobacco lobby. These were circulated in apparent response to current issues that had attracted public attention, but they often cited similar mass media articles on smoking, which was the fundamental motivation behind the duplicity. Such material could be rapidly circulated to local media through affiliated associations, provided it appeared to be independent journalism. TASSC's role was to question the public acceptance of science in general, rather than risk being identified with the cigarette companies.

The concept of merchandised-article proofs being circulated for free to small newspapers is adopted by many groups to successfully question peer-reviewed science and professional scientific associations and institutions in areas such as environmental science on issues including smoking, pesticides, and global warming. This program was operated most successfully by Steven Milloy.

== History ==
TASSC was created in 1993 by the APCO Worldwide public relations firm, and was funded by tobacco company Philip Morris (now Altria) to help fight against smoking regulations. TASSC's links to the tobacco industry were minimized as part of APCO's strategy to "establish an image of a national grassroots coalition."

The group has been described as an effort by tobacco companies who "wanted to cast grave doubts on government scientists' capacity to produce fair research", and who "quietly formed a coalition of industries that would challenge every aspect of government science, from its studies of global warming to auto safety." (Note: Foer (2004) referred to top EPA officials quietly blocking "dissemination of a report in 2003 analyzing the efficacy of congressional legislation limiting the release of sulfur dioxide, nitrogen oxides, and mercury. The administration quashed the report because it would have highlighted the necessity of imposing regulations it opposes.")

== Science advisors and board members ==
- Garrey Carruthers, former governor of New Mexico, served as chairman of TASSC from 1993 to 1998.
- Mickey Edwards, former Republican congressman, was appointed chair of TASSC's advisory board in 1995.
- Frederick Seitz, former United States National Academy of Sciences President and prominent global warming denier, served on the scientific advisory board, which had eight members.
- Michael Fumento – advisory board member
- Bruce Ames – advisory board member

== In popular culture ==
TASSC was parodied in the 2005 film Thank You for Smoking, in which the protagonist was a spokesperson for the "Academy of Tobacco Studies", an industry-funded lobby group dedicated to studying the effects of tobacco smoking with consistently inconclusive results.

In Barbara Kingsolver's novel Flight Behavior (2012), a scientist criticises a journalist (Tina Ultner) denying climate change and explains:

Convince me, Tina. You are letting public relations firm write your scripts for you. The same outfit that spent a decade manufacturing doubts for you about the smoking-and-cancer contention. Do you people never learn' it's the same damned company, Tina, the Advancement of Sound Science. Look it up, why don't you. They went off the Phillip Morris payroll and into the Exxon pocket.
