= Miles Yu =

American historian and adviser (born 1962)

- 余茂春
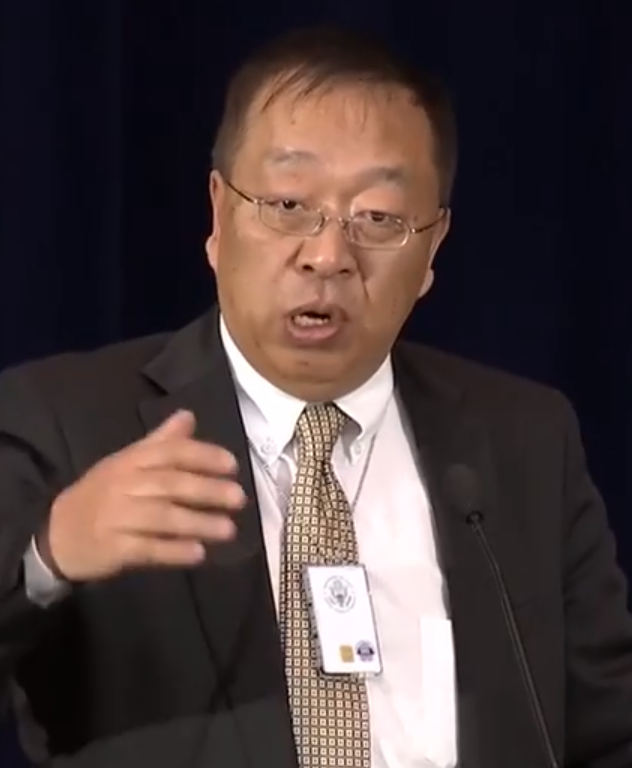
- Yu in 2019
- Born: 1962 (age 63–64); Anhui, China
- Occupations: Historian, strategist

Academic background
- Education: Nankai University; Swarthmore College; University of California, Berkeley

Academic work
- Discipline: History
- Sub-discipline: History of modern China
- Institutions: US Naval Academy; Hudson Institute; Hoover Institution

Miles Maochun Yu (Chinese: 余茂春; pinyin: Yú Màochūn, born 1962) is an American historian and strategist who served as the principal China policy and planning adviser to former United States Secretary of State Mike Pompeo.

Yu is a professor of military history and modern China at the United States Naval Academy in Annapolis, Maryland, and an Adjunct Professor at the Daniel K. Inouye Asia-Pacific Center for Security Studies in Honolulu, Hawaii. He is also a senior fellow at the Hudson Institute, where he directs the China Center, a senior fellow at the Institute for Indo-Pacific Security (IIPS), and a Visiting Fellow at the Hoover Institution.

Yu wrote for "Inside China", the weekly column of The Washington Times, for several years, and currently the weekly column "Red Horizon" , also for the Washington Times. He is the host of the weekly podcast "China Insider" at Hudson Institute. He has also hosted the "China Forum" lecture series. At the Hoover Institution, he is a member and contributor of the Military History and Contemporary Conflict Working Group.

== Early life and education ==
Yu was born in China's Anhui province and grew up in Chongqing. In 1979, he enrolled in Nankai University, where he studied history. He was inspired by President Ronald Reagan, whose speeches Yu heard on Voice of America broadcasts, to move to the United States. In 1985, he moved to Pennsylvania to study at Swarthmore College.

Yu earned his PhD from the University of California, Berkeley, in 1994, where he was a proponent for the 1989 Tiananmen Square protests.

== Career ==
Upon completion of his doctoral studies, Yu joined the faculty of the United States Naval Academy as a professor of modern China and military history.

Yu joined the Trump administration as its principal China policy planner and strategist, working under then-Secretary of State Mike Pompeo. Yu is regarded as one of the few senior U.S. government officials who have spent a significant period of time living inside communist China, is fluent in the Chinese language, and is familiar with the Chinese Communist Party's political culture and ideological nomenclature. He and Pompeo are seen as responsible for the Trump administration's "broad pushback against China." Under Pompeo, Yu worked with Kelley Eckels Currie, Mung Chiang, and David Stilwell to shape America's foreign policy toward China. He was often deemed a key influence on United States-Chinese policy within the administration. He has called his work under the Trump Administration on China "principled realism", which includes a distinction between the Chinese people and the CCP that rules the country.

On December 23, 2022, the Chinese Foreign Ministry announced that Yu, along with Todd Stein of the Congressional-Executive Commission on China, would be subject to sanctions taking effect the same day, including a freezing of all Chinese assets of the two, and an entry ban including their family members. The order specified that the measures were in retaliation to the sanctioning of former secretary Wu Yingjie of the Tibet Committee of the Chinese Communist Party and Tibet police chief Zhang Hongbo by the United States earlier that month over alleged human rights violations, but made no specific accusations against Yu. Yu responded by calling the sanctions on him "a badge of honor" and a publicity stunt by the Chinese government.

== Bibliography ==
Yu has published widely on China, U.S.-China relations, World War II/Asia, military history and the history of intelligence. His main works include the following:

- Yu, Maochun (2011). OSS in China: Prelude to Cold War. Naval Institute Press. ISBN 978-1-591-14986-6.
- Yu, Maochun (2006). The Dragon's War: Allied Operations and the Fate of China, 1937–1947. Naval Institute Press. ISBN 978-1-591-14946-0.
