= Hudson Institute =

American neoconservative think tank

Coordinates: 38°53′45″N 77°01′44″W

- Founded: 20 July 1961 (65 years ago)
- Founders: Herman Kahn; Max Singer; Oscar M. Ruebhausen
- Founded at: Croton-on-Hudson, NY
- Type: Nonprofit
- Tax ID no.: 13-1945157
- Legal status: 501(c)(3)
- Purpose: Promoting American leadership for a secure, free, and prosperous future
- Headquarters: Ste 400; 1201 Pennsylvania Avenue, N.W.; Washington, D.C. 20004-2453; United States
- Origins: RAND Corporation
- Region served: United States
- President and CEO: John P. Walters (Note: Walters was appointed president in January 2021.)
- Chairman: Sarah May Stern (Note: Stern became chairman in 2012 per the IRS Form 990 from 2012.)
- Subsidiaries: Hudson Analytical Services Inc
- Affiliations: Discovery Institute
- Revenue: $67 million (2025)
- Expenses: $24.5 million (2025)
- Endowment: $86.3 million (2024)
- Employees: 87 (2023)
- Volunteers: 237 (2016)
- Website: www.hudson.org

Hudson Institute is an American neoconservative (Note: Sources variously describe the Hudson Institute as both conservative and neo-conservative: Namely, The editorial team of Reuters refers to the “neoconservative Hudson Institute think tank;" Ben Terris in The Washington Post described it as “a Washington-based neoconservative think tank.” Meanwhile, Mitsuru Obe in The Wall Street Journal referred to the “conservative Hudson Institute," whereas Marc Thiessen — a former functionary in the Presidency of George W. Bush — called it “a conservative think tank" in The Washington Post.") think tank based in Washington, D.C.

It was founded in 1961 in Croton-on-Hudson, New York, by futurist Herman Kahn and his colleagues Max Singer and Oscar M. Ruebhausen at the RAND Corporation.

The institute's research branched out from the military into various areas including economics, health, education, and gambling. The institute moved to Indianapolis, Indiana, in 1984; 20 years later, in 2004, Hudson relocated to Washington, D.C..

It has worked with governments, including those of the United States, Japan, Taiwan, and Israel, and with private-sector donors and industries including defense contractors and agribusiness firms such as Monsanto. It is also the parent organization of the Discovery Institute, a Seattle-based think tank that advocates the pseudoscientific notion of intelligent design (ID).

== History ==
=== 1961–1982 ===
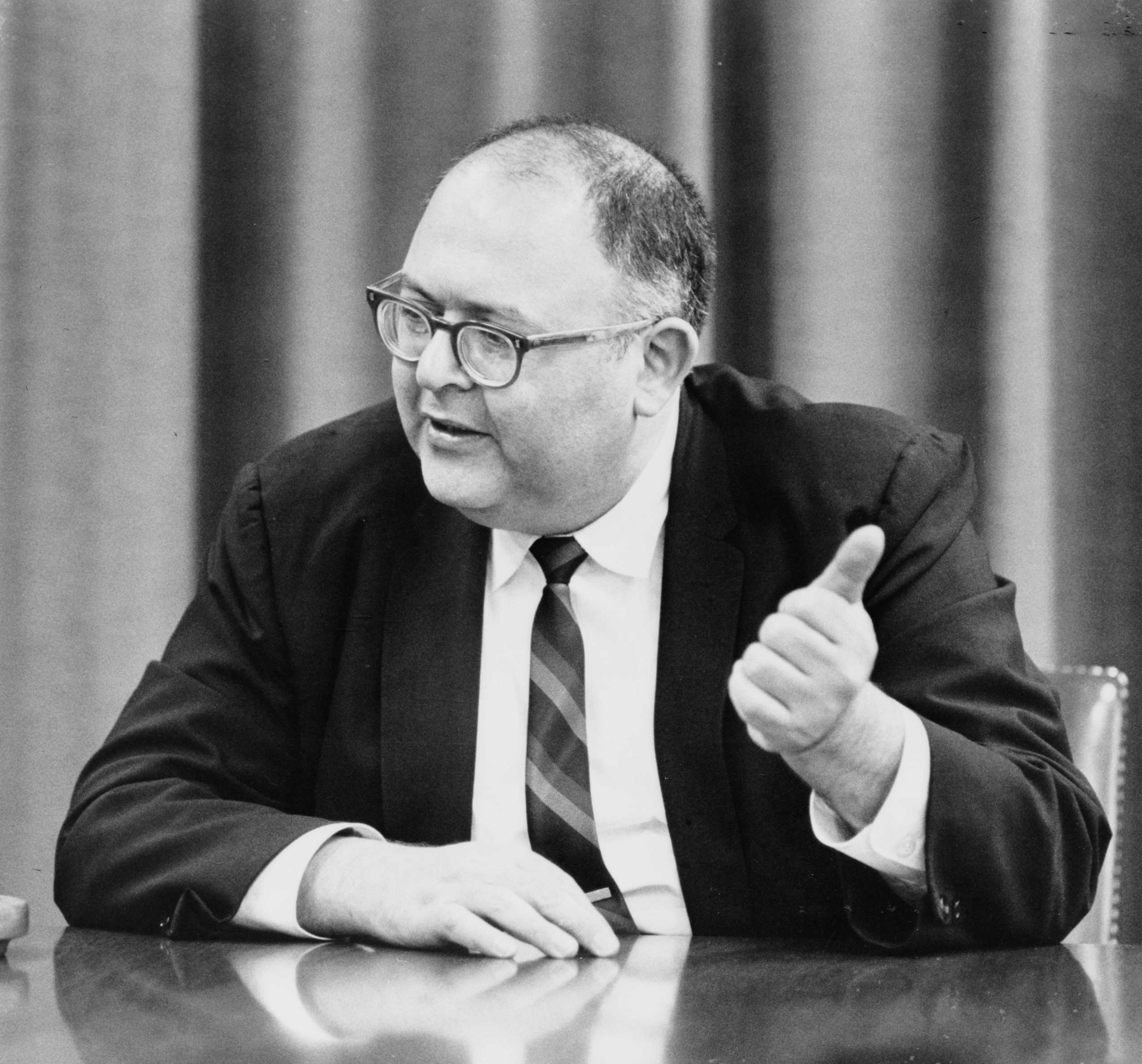
Herman Kahn, founder of the Hudson Institute

The Hudson Institute was founded in 1961 by Herman Kahn, Max Singer, and Oscar M. Ruebhausen. Kahn was a Cold War icon, often interviewed in magazines, who was purported to have the highest IQ on record and partly inspired the 1964 movie Dr. Strangelove. Kahn was a physicist and military consultant known for envisioning nuclear war scenarios. (Note: Kahn analyzed the likely consequences of nuclear war and recommended ways to improve survivability during the Cold War. Kahn posited the idea of a "winnable" nuclear exchange in his 1960 book On Thermonuclear War, for which he was one of the historical inspirations for the title character of Stanley Kubrick's Dr. Strangelove.) In 1960, while employed at the RAND Corporation, Kahn had given a series of lectures at Princeton University on scenarios related to nuclear war. In 1960, Princeton University Press published On Thermonuclear War, a book-length expansion of Kahn's lecture notes. Major controversies ensued, and Kahn and RAND parted ways.

Kahn moved to Croton-on-Hudson, New York, intending to establish a new think tank that was less hierarchical and bureaucratic. Along with Max Singer, a young government lawyer who had been Kahn's RAND colleague, and New York attorney Oscar Ruebhausen, Kahn founded the Hudson Institute on July 20, 1961. Kahn has been described as Hudson's driving intellect while Singer developed the institute's organization. Ruebhausen was an advisor to New York governor Nelson Rockefeller.

Hudson's initial research projects largely represented Kahn's personal interests, which included the domestic and military use of nuclear power and scenario planning exercises about policy options and their possible outcomes. The use of the word scenario in such exercises had been adapted from Hollywood storytelling as a more dignified word than "screenplay", and Kahn was an enthusiastic practitioner. Kahn and his colleagues made pioneering contributions to nuclear deterrence theory and strategy during this period.

Hudson's detailed analyses of "ladders of escalation" and reports on the likely consequences of limited and unlimited nuclear exchanges, eventually published as Thinking About the Unthinkable in 1962 and On Escalation: Metaphors and Scenarios in 1965, were influential within the Kennedy administration. They helped the institute win its first major research contract from the Office of Civil Defense at the Pentagon. A 1968 audit by the U.S. General Accounting Office raised concerns about the administration of Hudson's Office of Civil Defense research contracts, finding in one case that the work had added "nothing to the state of the art" and in another that it constituted a "rehash of old, if not tired ideas."

Meanwhile, in popular culture, Dr. Strangelove in 1964 borrowed many lines from Kahn's On Thermonuclear War, and the methods of Kahn, Hudson and RAND also inspired the 1967 satirical book The Report From Iron Mountain, depicting a supposedly secret study on the dangers of peace.

Kahn did not want Hudson limited to defense-related research, and along with Singer, he recruited a staff from diverse academic backgrounds. Hudson also involved a wide range of consultants for analysis and policy, including French philosopher Raymond Aron, African-American novelist Ralph Ellison, political scientist Henry Kissinger, conceptual artist James Lee Byars, and social scientist Daniel Bell. Its focus expanded to include geopolitics, economics, demography, anthropology, science and technology, education, and urban planning.

Kahn in 1962 predicted the rise of Japan as the world's second-largest economy and developed close ties to politicians and corporate leaders there.

Hudson Institute used scenario-planning techniques to forecast long-term developments and was noted for its future studies. In 1967, Hudson published The Year 2000, a bestselling book commissioned by the American Academy of Arts and Sciences. Many of the predictions proved correct, including technological developments like portable telephones and network-linked home and office computers.

In 1970, The Emerging Japanese Superstate was published. After the Club of Rome's 1972 report The Limits to Growth produced alarm about the possibility that population growth and resource depletion might result in a 21st-century global "collapse", Hudson responded with its own analysis, The Next 200 Years, which concluded instead that scientific and practical innovations were likely to significantly improve worldwide living standards.

Hudson struggled with funding problems in the 1970s for reasons including increased competition from other think tanks for government grants. It turned to grants from corporations such as IBM and Mobil.

In his 1982 book The Coming Boom, Kahn argued that pro-growth tax and fiscal policies, information technology, and developments by the energy industry would make possible an unprecedented prosperity in the Western world by the early 21st century. Kahn also foresaw unconventional extraction techniques like hydraulic fracturing.

Within 20 years, Hudson had offices in Bonn, Paris, Brussels, Montreal and Tokyo. Other research projects were related to South Korea, Singapore, Australia and Latin America.

=== 1983–2000 ===
After Kahn's sudden death at age 61 on July 7, 1983, Hudson was restructured. Recruited by the City of Indianapolis and the Lilly Endowment, Hudson relocated its headquarters to Indiana in 1984. In 1987, Mitch Daniels, a former aide to Senator Richard Lugar and President Ronald Reagan, was appointed CEO.

William Eldridge Odom, former director of the National Security Agency, became Hudson's director of national security studies; economist Alan Reynolds became director of economic research. Technologist George Gilder led a project on the implications of the digital era for American society.

In 1990, Daniels quit to become vice president of corporate affairs at Eli Lilly and Company. He was succeeded as CEO by Leslie Lenkowsky, a social scientist, and former consultant to Senator Daniel Patrick Moynihan.

Under Lenkowsky, Hudson emphasized domestic and social policy. During the early 1990s, the institute did work concerning education reform and applied research on charter schools and school choice.

Also in 1990, Hudson Institute spun off a subsidiary non-profit organization that took the name the Discovery Institute.

At the initiative of Wisconsin governor Tommy Thompson, two members of Hudson were in the small planning group that designed the Wisconsin Works welfare-to-work program. Hudson also helped fund the planning and evaluated the results. A version was adopted nationwide in the 1996 federal welfare-reform legislation signed by President Bill Clinton. In 2001, President George W. Bush's initiative on charitable choice was based on Hudson's research into social-service programs administered by faith-based organizations.

Other Hudson research from this period included 1987's "Workforce 2000", the "Blue Ribbon Commission on Hungary" (1990) "International Baltic Economic Commission" (1991–93), on market-oriented reforms in the newly independent states of Eastern Europe, and the 1997 follow-up study "Workforce 2020".

In 1997, Lenkowsky was succeeded by Herbert London.

=== 2001–2016 ===
After the September 11 attacks, Hudson emphasized international issues such as the Middle East, Latin America, and Islam. On June 1, 2004, Hudson relocated its headquarters to Washington, D.C.

In 2012, Sarah May Stern became chairman of the board of trustees, and remains so to the present.

In 2016, Hudson relocated from its McPherson Square headquarters to a custom-built office space on Pennsylvania Avenue, near the U.S. Capitol and the White House. The new LEED-certified offices were designed by FOX Architects. The Prime Minister of Japan Shinzo Abe presided over the opening of the new offices.

=== 2016–present ===
US Vice President Mike Pence used the institute as his venue for a major policy speech concerning China on October 4, 2018.

In 2021, Mike Pompeo and Elaine Chao, Secretary of Transportation in the Trump administration, joined the institute. In January 2021, John P. Walters was appointed president and CEO of the Hudson Institute. Walters succeeded Kenneth R. Weinstein, who became the first Walter P. Stern Distinguished Fellow. Former U.S. attorney general William P. Barr joined as a distinguished fellow in 2022.

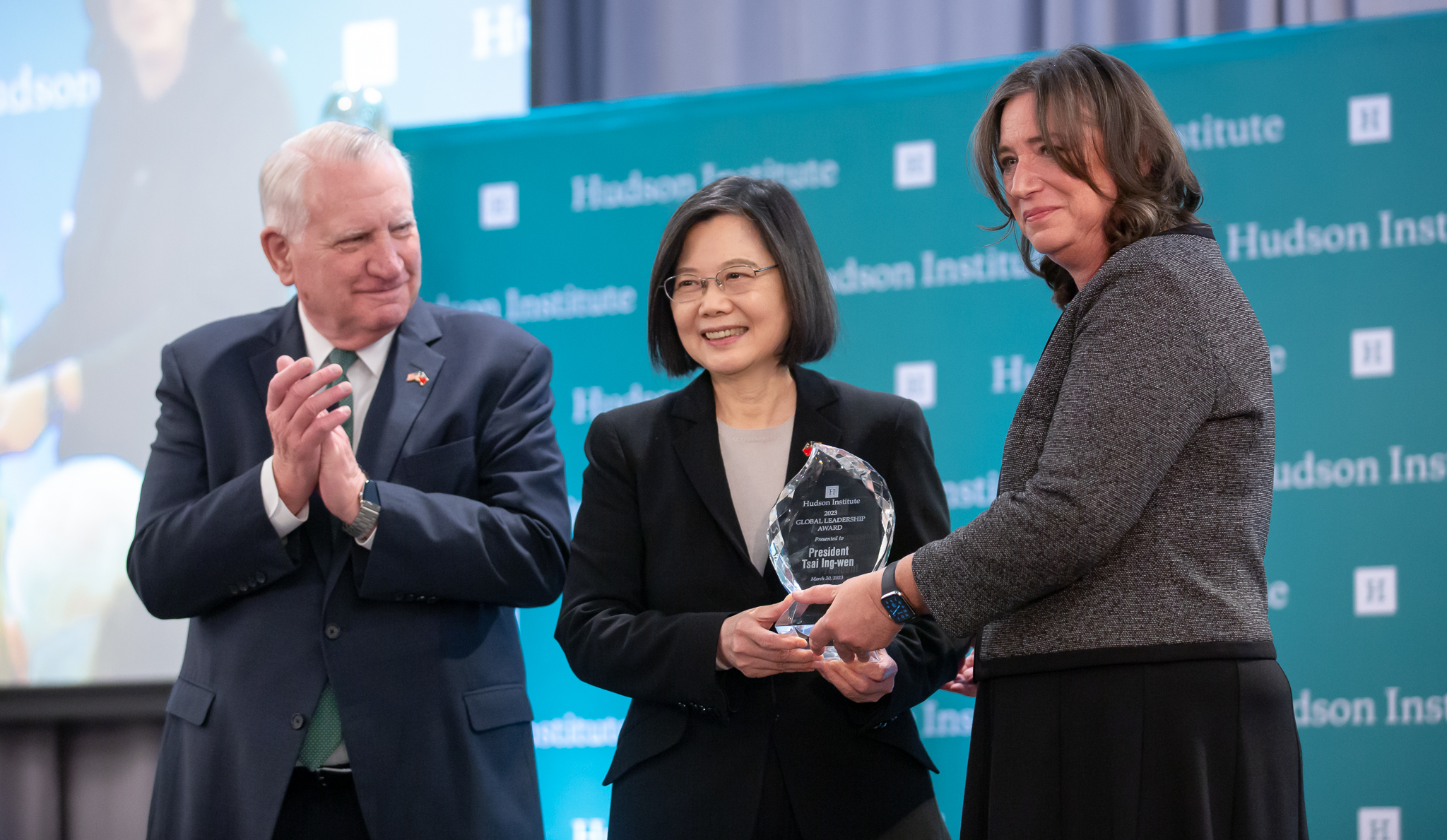
President Tsai accepts the institute's Global Leadership Award, 2023.

On March 30, 2023, President Tsai Ing-wen of Taiwan attended an event held by the Hudson Institute, where she accepted the institute's Global Leadership Award. In response to the award event, the Foreign Ministry of China imposed sanctions on the institute, its Board of Trustees Chair Sarah May Stern, and its President and CEO John P. Walters.

In September 2023, the Hudson Institute was designated as an "undesirable organization" in Russia.

European Commission President Ursula von der Leyen spoke at the Hudson Institute in support of Israel in October 2023 after the October 7 attacks. The speech was coordinated with the White House as President Joe Biden urged Congress to approve additional aid to support Ukraine and Israel.

The institute provides several briefing services, such as the Keystone Defense Initiative, where Rebecca Heinrichs is the senior fellow and director.

== Sponsored awards ==
Hudson offers two annual awards, the Herman Kahn Award and the Global Leadership Awards. Past Hudson Institute honorees include Nikki Haley, Paul Ryan, Mike Pence, Mike Pompeo, Ronald Reagan, Henry Kissinger, Rupert Murdoch, Dick Cheney, Joseph Lieberman, Benjamin Netanyahu, David Petraeus, Shinzo Abe, Mitch McConnell and Elaine Chao.

== Funding, disclosure, and conflicts-of-interest concerns ==
Hudson Institute is funded by donations from individuals, foundations, corporations, and governments. As of 2021, the organization reported revenue of $37.4 million, expenses of $19.4 million, and an endowment of $81.1 million.

Hudson Institute's funding and donor relationships have drawn scrutiny in reporting on think-tank transparency and disclosure. In 1999, Hudson fellow Dennis Avery promoted claims linking organic food consumption to increased E. coli O157:H7 risk. The New York Times later described Hudson as a "well-financed research organization" in reporting on Avery's attacks on organic farming. Avery's claims rested on a disputed attribution: he asserted that data from the Centers for Disease Control and Prevention showed organic food consumers were eight times more likely to contract E. coli O157:H7, citing a CDC epidemiologist as his source. The CDC issued a public statement on January 14, 1999, stating that it had "not conducted any study that compares or quantitates the specific risk for infection with E. coli O157:H7 and eating either conventionally grown or organic/natural foods." The epidemiologist named by Avery as his source denied making any such statement to him.

Another Hudson employee, Michael Fumento, was reported by BusinessWeek to have received funding from Monsanto for his 1999 book Bio-Evolution. According to the report, Monsanto paid Fumento $60,000 through Hudson, and Hudson president Kenneth R. Weinstein said he was uncertain whether the payment should have been disclosed.

In 2016, The New York Times reported that Huntington Ingalls Industries had used Hudson to bolster the company's case for more nuclear-powered aircraft carriers. The newspaper reported that a former naval officer was paid through Hudson to produce an analysis favoring additional funding, and that the report was submitted to the House Armed Services Committee without disclosing that Huntington Ingalls had helped fund it. Hudson acknowledged the omission and described it as a "mistake".

Hudson has also received funding tied to foreign governments and defense-sector interests. According to The American Prospect, the institute received more than $100,000 in 2018 from the Taipei Economic and Cultural Representative Office and none of the institute's researchers who published work favoring closer U.S.–Taiwan ties disclosed that funding in the pieces discussed by the magazine. In 2021, The Intercept reported that Hudson had received a Pentagon contract to produce a report on aircraft defense and approximately $2.24 million from U.S. defense contractors since 2019, based on tax filings. Ben Freeman of the Center for International Policy said that advocating increased Pentagon spending while receiving Pentagon and defense-contractor funding posed a conflict of interest that should be disclosed.

== Politics ==
Employees of the Hudson Institute have made substantial political donations. During the 2022 election cycle, they donated $128,893 to federal campaigns, the vast majority of which went to Republican candidates and PACs. A major recipient was Rep. Liz Cheney.

The institute is generally described as conservative and sometimes neoconservative. Hudson, for one, claims to host policymakers, foreign policy experts, and elected officials from across the political spectrum, and according to its website, it "challenges conventional thinking and helps manage strategic transitions through interdisciplinary studies in defense, international relations, economics, energy, technology, culture, and law."

== Policy centers ==
=== Center for Peace and Security in the Middle East ===
Led by Michael Doran, the center studies challenges for America and its allies in the Middle East in responding to threats posed by forces such as Iran, Russia, and China.

=== China Center ===
The China Center at the Hudson Institute studies China with the stated goal of developing American responses to the "China challenge". The center was launched in May 2022. It is directed by Miles Yu while Mike Pompeo serves as chair of the advisory board, which has included Scott Morrison, Paula Dobriansky, Morgan Ortagus, and Kyle Bass. Bass, who serves on the China Center advisory board, built a multiyear short position against the Chinese yuan beginning in July 2015, which he maintained while advising the center on China policy; he closed the position in 2019.

=== Center on Europe and Eurasia ===
The Center on Europe and Eurasia focuses on European security, transatlantic relations, and the Russo-Ukrainian War. The center was launched in 2022.

=== Japan Chair ===
The Japan Chair at the Hudson Institute is led by Kenneth R. Weinstein, a fellow at the institute and its former CEO. It focuses on strengthening the U.S.-Japan Alliance. The chair was founded in 2009 under the leadership of General H. R. McMaster, who later served as chair of its advisory board.

=== Hamilton Commission on Securing America's National Security Innovation Base ===
The Hudson Institute houses this bipartisan commission, which explores economic sectors critical to national security and proposes policy recommendations aimed at reducing dependence and advancing U.S. leadership in those industries.

The commission is chaired by Nadia Schadlow and Arthur L. Herman. Other members have included:

- Mike Gallagher, member of the U.S. House of Representatives
- Ellen Lord, former Undersecretary of Defense for Acquisition and Sustainment
- Stephanie Murphy, former member of the U.S. House of Representatives
- Kimberly Reed, former president and chairman of the Export-Import Bank of the United States
- Eric J. Wesley, executive vice president of Flyer Defense, LLC

=== Kleptocracy Initiative ===
Hudson launched the Kleptocracy Initiative in response to Russia's annexation of Crimea in 2014. The initiative received criticism from a member of its own advisory board when the institute's 2018 awards gala was co-sponsored in part by Len Blavatnik, a Soviet-born magnate who had business dealings with Russian oligarchs on United States sanctions lists. Charles Davidson, the founder of the Kleptocracy Initiative, resigned from Hudson in protest, telling the New York Post that Blavatnik represented "precisely what the Kleptocracy Initiative is fighting against — the influence of Putin's oligarchs on America's political system and society." Hudson subsequently returned the donation.

== Finances ==
2019 finances:

2019 Revenue: $57,100,000
1. Individuals (57.0%)
2. Investments Activity (18.0%)
3. Corporations (4.00%)
4. Governments (12.0%)
5. Foundations (9.00%)
2019 Expenses: $18,600,000
1. National Security and Foreign Policy (53.0%)
2. Management and Administration (19.0%)
3. Public Affairs and Government Relations (5.00%)
4. Development (7.00%)
5. Economic and Domestic Policy (16.0%)

== Notable personnel ==
- John P. Walters, President and CEO
- Thomas J. Donohue
- Marshall Billingslea, Senior Fellow
- Ezra Cohen, Adjunct Fellow
- Michael Doran, Senior Fellow
- Arthur L. Herman, Senior Fellow

=== Other notable persons ===
- Raymond Aron
- Daniel Bell
- Robert Bork
- Rudy Boschwitz
- Paul Bracken
- Mitch Daniels
- Pierre S. du Pont, IV
- Ralph Ellison
- Saagar Enjeti
- Douglas Feith, Senior Fellow (2008–) Feith served as Under Secretary of Defense for Policy in the George W. Bush administration and directed Hudson's Center for National Security Strategies. A Pentagon Inspector General report found that his office had "developed, produced, and then disseminated alternative intelligence assessments on the Iraq and al-Qaeda relationship, which included some conclusions that were inconsistent with the consensus of the Intelligence Community, to senior decision-makers."
- Michael Fumento
- Nikki Haley
- Alexander Haig
- Michael Hudson (born 1939), economics professor
- Donald Kagan
- Amy A. Kass
- Henry Kissinger
- I. Lewis "Scooter" Libby, Senior Vice President Libby served as chief of staff to Vice President Dick Cheney until his indictment in October 2005. On March 6, 2007, a federal jury convicted him on four counts in connection with the leak of covert CIA officer Valerie Plame's identity. He initially joined Hudson as a senior adviser in January 2006 but resigned the day after his conviction. He subsequently rejoined and served as Senior Vice President for over a decade, according to Hudson's IRS Form 990 filings.
- Andrew Natsios
- William Odom
- John O'Sullivan
- Erin O'Toole
- Marcello Pera
- Michael Pillsbury
- Andrey Piontkovsky
- Joel Pollak
- Mike Pompeo
- Ron Prosor
- Dan Quayle
- Ronald Radosh
- David Satter
- Abram Shulsky
- Irwin Stelzer
- Curtin Winsor Jr.

== See also ==
- Discovery Institute
