= Michael Fumento =

American journalist (born 1960)

Michael A. Fumento
- Born: 1960 (age 65–66)
- Education: Fayetteville State University; University of Illinois College of Law
- Occupations: Author, analyst, journalist, attorney
- Writing career
- Language: English
- Website: www.fumento.com

Michael A. Fumento (born 1960) is an American author, analyst, attorney, and investigative journalist who currently resides in the Philippines.

== Life and career ==
Fumento grew up in Champaign, Illinois. He is the son of Tobey and Rocco Fumento, the latter being a professor emeritus in English, film, and creative writing who has worked at the University of Illinois.

Fumento's father is Italian American and Catholic, and Fumento's mother is Jewish. Fumento is Catholic.

A graduate of the University of Illinois College of Law and a member of the Pennsylvania Bar Association, he has a bachelor's degree in political science from Fayetteville State University, at Fort Bragg, North Carolina, which he earned while he served as a paratrooper in the US Army. He embedded three times in Iraq and once in Afghanistan and observed combat operations of the Navy SEALs and the 101st Airborne Division.

His work comprises over 70 subject areas. Google Scholar has almost 1,200 citations of his work. Publishers Weekly stated that he has "knack for debunking popular beliefs and revealing the true state of things," and The New York Times Book Review stated, "His arguments, statistics and perceptions appear almost as irrefutable as they are controversial."

Nature stated that in some of Fumento's work, "some important scientific issues are dismissed or glossed over" and that "there is a fine line between persuasion and persecution."

After he was fired from Scripps Howard News Service in 2006, he was described by Science as "a vigorous defender of the pharmaceutical and biotech industries over the years".

He is best known for science and health issues, especially what he considers faux crises, including the 1987 "heterosexual AIDS explosion," swine flu and the alleged epidemic of runaway Toyotas.

=== Journalism ===
Fumento has been a nationally syndicated columnist for the Scripps Howard News Service (before his firing in 2006), a legal writer for The Washington Times, a science correspondent for Reason magazine, an editorial writer for the Rocky Mountain News in Denver, and the first national issues reporter for Investor's Business Daily. When he was embedded four times in Iraq and Afghanistan, his research and reporting from Ramadi was praised by General David Petraeus: "Great stuff with a great unit in a very tough neighborhood!" Some of his combat video footage has aired on the History Channel.

A finalist for the National Magazine Award, he has had articles appear in publications including Reader's Digest, The Atlantic Monthly, Forbes, Forbes.com, USA Weekend, The Weekly Standard, National Review, The New Republic, The Washington Monthly, Reason, Policy Review, The American Spectator, Nature Medicine, The Spectator (London), a3Umwelt (Austria), and The Bulletin (Australia). He has appeared in newspapers including the Wall Street Journal, The New York Times, Washington Post, Los Angeles Times, Chicago Tribune, Christian Science Monitor, Sunday Times of London, Sunday Telegraph of London, and the Jerusalem Post.

His television appearances include Nightline; ABC World News; ABC News 20/20, numerous programs on CBS, NBC, CNN, and Fox; PBS; MacNeil-Lehrer; CNBC; the BBC; the Canadian Broadcasting Network; C-SPAN; the Christian Broadcasting Network; Donahue; This Week with David Brinkley, the History Channel, ESPN, and many others. Fumento has lectured throughout the world.

Fumento has been outspoken in his support of adult stem cell research and critical of embryonic stem cell research and has criticized what he regards as a liberal and corporate bias in favor of the latter.

For Science Under Siege, he received two awards, including the American Council on Science and Health's Distinguished Science Journalist of 1993.

=== "Debunking" crises ===
Fumento argues that many reports of threats to society are based on bad science and misused statistics. In addition to AIDS, Fumento's writing on science has covered such topics as global warming, ADHD, obesity, the health dangers of breast implants, teen drug use, and agrarian utopianism. He has been highly critical of what he considers extreme alarmism over such diseases as SARS and the potential of a human avian flu pandemic.

A common theme is his claim that many liberal environmental groups have a hysterical response to most artificial chemicals. He writes that naturally occurring food chemicals are often as toxic as artificial compounds and that there is no scientific reason to view natural compounds as inherently safer. Environmental groups, he holds, willingly accept claims that manmade compounds cause cancer but gloss over the fact that the toxicity tests often involve quantities that are millions of times larger than what a human would ever ingest.

Several articles deal with the agricultural chemical Alar, banned as a carcinogen in the United States. Fumento noted that the dosages in one Alar study were the equivalent of almost 30 thousand apples a day for life. In his view, it is impossible to test megadoses of chemicals on mice or rats and to extrapolate the results to conclusions about small doses on humans. The statistical nature of these studies, often analyzed by non-statisticians, leaves them vulnerable to extrapolation error. Researchers remain divided on the utility of such tests and on the safety of Alar, in particular.

He has been a frequent critic of activist Erin Brockovich since her eponymous movie first appeared in 2000.

Fumento describes himself as a political conservative. He has drawn criticism from liberal and veterans' activist groups for his views on Gulf War Syndrome (his Reason article "Gulf Lore Syndrome" was a National Magazine Award finalist in 1998) and for his writings since 1987, which state that the threat of AIDS to the heterosexual population was greatly overstated. He promotes a position of "skepticism" toward claims that manmade chemicals cause cancer in humans.

=== Heterosexual AIDS ===
External videos
- Booknotes interview with Fumento on The Myth of Heterosexual AIDS, February 25, 1990, C-SPAN

Fumento has argued that the perception of infectious disease outbreaks becomes exaggerated or distorted by those who exploit them to serve various agendas. In November 1987, he published an article, "AIDS: Are Heterosexuals at Risk?" in Commentary that in 1990 became the basis of a controversial book, The Myth of Heterosexual AIDS: How a Tragedy Has Been Distorted by the Media and Partisan Politics. He wrote dozens of subsequent pieces on the subject. In Commentary, he challenged the presumption of Life magazine, whose July 1985 cover declared in bold red letters, "Now No One Is Safe from AIDS."

By 1987, the theme had become common. A January U.S. News & World Report cover story declared, "The disease of them is suddenly the disease of us... finding fertile growth among heterosexuals." A New York Times headline that month read: "AIDS May Dwarf the Plague," citing remarks of the Secretary of Health and Human Services, Otis R. Bowen, that AIDS could be worse than the "Black Death," which is estimated to have killed 30 percent to 60 percent of Europe's population. Surgeon General C. Everett Koop made remarks giving rise to the term "heterosexual AIDS explosion." Oprah Winfrey told her audience, "Research studies now project that one in five—listen to me, hard to believe—one in five heterosexuals could be dead from AIDS at the end of the next three years."

Fumento challenged that orthodoxy for which he and even those who wrote about him were condemned and even threatened. He did so by interviewing and citing the work of epidemiologists, including the top Centers for Disease Control and Prevention (CDC) AIDS epidemiologist, Dr. Harold Jaffe, who told him, "Those who are suggesting that we are going to see an explosive spread of AIDS in the heterosexual population have to explain why this isn't happening."

Although he would be accused of claiming heterosexuals have no AIDS risk, the back cover of his AIDS book stated, "The 'myth' of heterosexual AIDS consists of a series of myths, one of which is not that heterosexuals get AIDS. They certainly do get it.... " Rather, he argued that while white middle-class heterosexuals were the target of AIDS propaganda, "the profile of the typical victim of heterosexually transmitted AIDS is a lower-class black woman who is the regular sex partner of an IV drug user."

As of 2007, the CDC's "estimated numbers of cases and rates (per 100,000 population) of HIV/AIDS," was 60.6 for black women but only 3.3 for white women. In a theme discussed in Commentary and in his book, Fumento described various agendas served by promoting "AIDS hysteria:" "On the opposite side of the spectrum Christian fundamentalists deploy it in order to underline their vision of morality," he wrote in Commentary. He also discussed it in a 1988 New Republic cover story.

=== Monsanto controversy ===
On January 13, 2006, Scripps Howard announced it would terminate its business relationship with Fumento and cease carrying his column. At issue were opinion columns Fumento had written concerning the biotechnology firm Monsanto Company while he was a senior fellow at the Hudson Institute, a conservative think tank. The connection between Fumento and Monsanto was first revealed by investigative reporter Eamon Javers in Business Week. General manager Peter Copeland explained that Fumento "did not tell SHNS editors, and therefore we did not tell our readers, that in 1999 Hudson received a $60,000 grant from Monsanto.... Our policy is that he should have disclosed that information. We apologize to our readers."

Fumento acknowledged that he benefited from Monsanto's grant to Hudson, which was meant for his book on agribusiness, BioEvolution. He wrote on the Townhall website: "It was a $60,000 book grant to my employer, solicited back in 1999, which was applied to pre-established salary and benefits." He told The Washington Post that he didn't disclose the Monsanto grant in his book because "Monsanto asked me not to", that he had no obligation to inform Scripps Howard or its readers about the past payment, and that he had feared that disclosure would lead his critics to call him a "corporate whore". He wrote that of approximately 100 columns he had written, three mentioned Monsanto.

=== Swine flu ===
During the 2009 swine flu pandemic, Fumento opined in a February 2010 Forbes article that the World Health Organization (WHO) had faked the pandemic and that "The agency needed to bounce back after the avian flu embarrassment." In an August 2010 The Philadelphia Inquirer article, Fumento said in response to the WHO declaring the swine flu pandemic over that "the WHO had no business labeling it a "pandemic." It did so purely for its own interests, wreaking worldwide havoc."

=== Break with "extreme right" ===
In a May 2012 essay, Fumento said that he considered himself part of the "Old Right" but that he rejected the "extreme right," which, he wrote, had taken over the Republican Party and dominated conservative media. He wrote, "I'm horrified that these people have co-opted the name 'conservative' to scream their messages of hate and anger."

=== COVID-19 ===
In a January 23, 2020, New York Post opinion article, "Don’t buy the media hype over the new China virus," he called concerns about COVID-19 during the COVID-19 pandemic "tinfoil-hat paranoia" and wrote that "there appears to be nothing very special about this outbreak". In a March 8, 2020, followup opinion article, he decried the "pure hysteria" about the virus," noting that there had been only 19 deaths in the US at the time, and maintained that "the spread of the virus continues to slow."

== Affiliations ==
Fumento has been affiliated with the following organizations:

- Independent Journalism Project—director
- Washington Times—legal writer, later freelancer
- Hudson Institute—senior fellow from 1998 to 2006
- National Journalism Center
- Investor's Business Daily—national issues staff writer/later freelance
- The Advancement of Sound Science Coalition (TASSC) on Advisory Board

== Books ==
- Fumento, Michael (1990) The Myth of Heterosexual AIDS: How a Tragedy Has Been Distorted by the Media and Partisan Politics. Basic Books, New York, 1990. A New Republic Book. ISBN 1-59403-057-X
- Fumento, Michael (1993). The Myth of Heterosexual AIDS: How a Tragedy Has Been Distorted by the Media and Partisan Politics. Regnery Publishing. ISBN 0-89526-729-2.
- Fumento, Michael (1993). Science Under Siege: Balancing Technology and the Environment. William Morrow & Company. ISBN 0-688-10795-8.
- Fumento, Michael (1997). Polluted Science: The EPA's Campaign to Expand Clean Air Regulations. AEI Press. ISBN 0-8447-4041-1.
- Fumento, Michael (1997). The Fat of the Land: The Obesity Epidemic and How Overweight Americans Can Help Themselves. Viking. ISBN 0-670-87059-5.
- Fumento, Michael (2003). BioEvolution: How Biotechnology Is Changing Our World. Encounter Books. ISBN 1-893554-75-9.
