= Alex Abella =

American author and journalist

Alex Abella (born 1950) is an American author and journalist best known for his non-fiction works Soldiers of Reason: The RAND Corporation and the Rise of the American Empire (2008) and Shadow Enemies: Hitler's Secret Terrorist Plot Against the United States (2003, with Scott Gordon).

== Early life ==
Abella was born in Cuba in 1950. His family left the country after the failed Bay of Pigs invasion of 1961. The family settled in New York, where Abella attended Columbia University on a Pulitzer scholarship. At school, he wrote for the Columbia Daily Spectator.

== Career ==
After college, Abella moved to California to work for the San Francisco Chronicle initially covering local news, then network news as a reporter, writer, and producer.

Abella left the San Francisco Bay Area in the late 1980s for Los Angeles, spending seven years there as a Spanish language interpreter for the Los Angeles Superior Court. His first novel, The Killing of the Saints (1991), is a Los Angeles crime thriller about the beliefs of the Santería religion used as a defense for murder. Saints and its sequels, Dead of Night (1998) and Final Acts (2000), feature a Cuban-American lawyer and investigator of Cuban heritage.

Abella's second novel, The Great American (1997) is set in Cuba in 1957 during the Cuban Revolution and is the fictionalized story of a United States Marine who fought on the side of Fidel Castro.

Abella's non-fiction work includes Shadow Enemies: Hitler's Secret Terrorist Plot Against the United States (2003), co-authored with law professor and current Los Angeles Superior Court judge Scott Gordon. The book is set in Germany during World War II and follows a group of German-American agents trained in sabotage and terrorism.

The author's most recent book, Soldiers of Reason: The RAND Corporation and the Rise of the American Empire (2008), is the first history of the foreign policy think tank founded by the United States Military and funded in part by the United States Government. The book was longlisted for the National Book Award.

In addition to his nonfiction books, Abella has been a contributing writer with the Los Angeles Times and now contributes to the Huffington Post.

== Awards ==
At KTVU-TV, Abella was nominated for an Emmy Award for "Best Breaking News Story." His first novel, The Killing of the Saints (1991), was a New York Times Notable Book.

== Works ==
=== Novels ===
- The Great American. Simon & Schuster. 1997. ISBN 9780743205481.
- Shanghai. 2009.
- More than a Woman. 2013.

==== Charlie Morel series ====
- The Killing of the Saints. Crown Publishing Group. 1991. ISBN 9780517585092.
- Dead of Night. Simon & Schuster. 1998. ISBN 9780684814261.
- Final Acts. Simon & Schuster. 2000. ISBN 9780684859897.

=== Non-fiction books ===
- The Total Banana. Harcourt Brace Jovanovich. 1979. ISBN 9780156904759.
- Abella, Alex; Gordon, Scott (2003). Shadow Enemies: Hitler's Secret Terrorist Plot Against the United States. Lyons Press. ISBN 9781585747221.
- Soldiers of Reason: The RAND Corporation and the Rise of the American Empire. Houghton Mifflin. 2008. ISBN 9780151010813.
